= Lesley J. McNair =

United States Army officer (1883–1944)

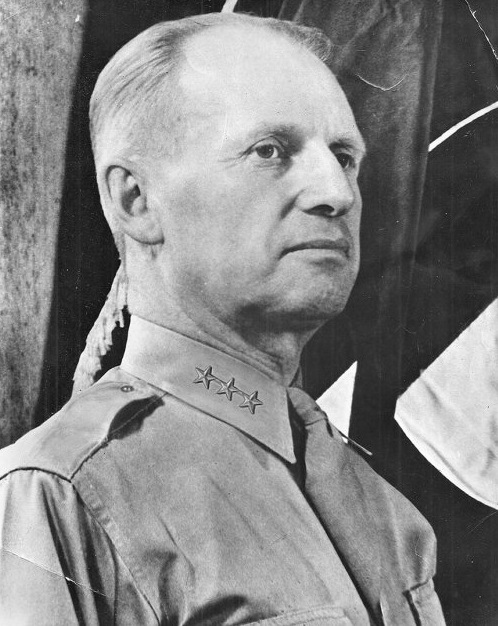
- McNair as Army Ground Forces commander, c. 1942
- Born: 25 May 1883; Verndale, Minnesota, United States
- Died: 25 July 1944 (aged 61); Saint-Lô, Normandy, France
- Burial place: Normandy American Cemetery and Memorial, France
- Spouse: Clare Huster (m. 1905–1944)
- Children: 1
- Military career
- Allegiance: United States
- Branch: United States Army
- Service years: 1904–1944
- Rank: Lieutenant general (Army of the United States); General (posthumous)
- Nickname: Whitey
- Service number: 0-1891
- Unit: Field Artillery Branch
- Commands: Battery C, 4th Field Artillery Regiment; Battery D, 4th Field Artillery Regiment; Reserve Officers' Training Corps, Purdue University; 2nd Battalion, 16th Field Artillery Regiment; 2nd Battalion, 83rd Field Artillery Regiment; Civilian Conservation Corps District E, Seventh Corps Area; 2nd Field Artillery Brigade, 2nd Infantry Division; United States Army Command and General Staff School; Army Ground Forces; First United States Army Group (fictitious)
- Conflicts: Banana Wars; Battle of Veracruz; Border War; Pancho Villa Expedition; First World War; Second World War; North African campaign; Operation Overlord; Operation Cobra †
- Awards: Distinguished Service Medal (3); Purple Heart (2); Legion of Honor (Officer) (France)

Lesley James McNair (25 May 1883 – 25 July 1944) was an American Army officer who served during World War I and World War II. He attained the rank of lieutenant general during his life; he was killed in action during World War II, and received a posthumous promotion to general.

A Minnesota native and 1904 graduate of the United States Military Academy, McNair was a Field Artillery officer with a background in the Ordnance Department. A veteran of the Battle of Veracruz and Pancho Villa Expedition, during World War I he served as assistant chief of staff for training with the 1st Division, and then chief of artillery training on the staff at the American Expeditionary Forces headquarters. His outstanding performance resulted in his promotion to temporary brigadier general; at age 35, he was the Army's second-youngest general officer.

McNair's experience of more than 30 years with equipment and weapons design and testing, his administrative skills, and his success in the areas of military education and training led to his World War II assignment as commander of Army Ground Forces. In this position, McNair became the "unsung architect of the U.S. Army", and played a leading role in the organizational design, equipping, and training of Army units in the United States before they departed for overseas combat. While historians continue to debate some of McNair's decisions and actions, including the individual replacement system for killed and wounded soldiers, and a controversy over the use of tanks or tank destroyers as anti-tank weapons, his concentration on advanced officer education, innovative weapons systems, improved doctrine, realistic combat training, and development of combined arms tactics enabled the Army to modernize and perform successfully on the World War II battlefield, where the mobility of mechanized forces replaced the static defenses of World War I as the primary tactical consideration.

He was killed by friendly fire while in France to act as commander of the fictitious First United States Army Group, part of the Operation Quicksilver deception that masked the actual landing sites for the Invasion of Normandy. During Operation Cobra, an Eighth Air Force bomb landed in his foxhole near Saint-Lô when the Army attempted to use heavy bombers for close air support of infantry operations as part of the Battle of Normandy.

== Early life ==
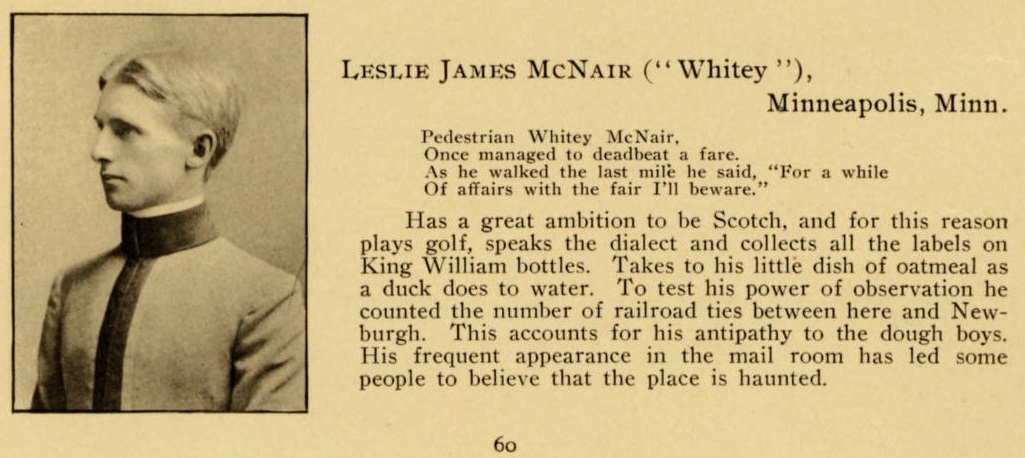
McNair in 1904's Howitzer, the West Point yearbook. The reference to King William bottles describes a brand of Scotch whisky.

McNair was born in Verndale, Minnesota, on 25 May 1883, the son of James and Clara (Manz) McNair. He was the second-born of their six children, and the first son. His siblings who lived to adulthood were: sister Nora, the wife of Harry Jessup; brother Murray Manz McNair; and sister Irene, the wife of Harry R. Naftalin.

McNair attended school in Verndale through the ninth grade, the highest available locally; his parents then relocated to Minneapolis so McNair and his siblings could complete high school. After graduating from South High School in 1897, he competed successfully for an appointment to the United States Naval Academy. While he was on the Naval Academy waiting list as an alternate, he began studies at the Minnesota School of Business in Minneapolis, where he concentrated primarily on mechanical engineering and statistics courses.

Frustrated with the wait to start at the Naval Academy, in 1900 McNair competed for appointment to the United States Military Academy and took an examination offered by U.S. Senators Cushman Kellogg Davis and Knute Nelson. Initially selected as an alternate in July 1900, he was quickly accepted as a member of the class that began that August. While at West Point, his fellow students nicknamed him "Whitey" for his ash blond hair; they continued to use it with him for the rest of his life. The description of McNair which accompanied the photo of him in West Point's yearbook for his senior year refers to him as "Pedestrian Whitey" and details an incident when he had to walk from Newburgh to West Point, a distance of 11 miles (18 km), after having missed the last train while returning from visiting his fiancée in New York City; the yearbook also contains an anonymously authored poem, "'Whitey's' Record Walk", about the same incident.

Several of McNair's classmates also went on to prominent careers in the Army, including George R. Allin, Charles School Blakely, Robert M. Danford, Pelham D. Glassford, Edmund L. Gruber, Henry Conger Pratt, Henry J. Reilly, Joseph Stilwell, and Innis P. Swift. McNair graduated in 1904, and was commissioned as a second lieutenant. The top five or six graduates usually chose the engineer branch; McNair's high class standing (11th of 124) earned him a place in the second choice of most high-ranking graduates, the artillery branch.

== Early career ==
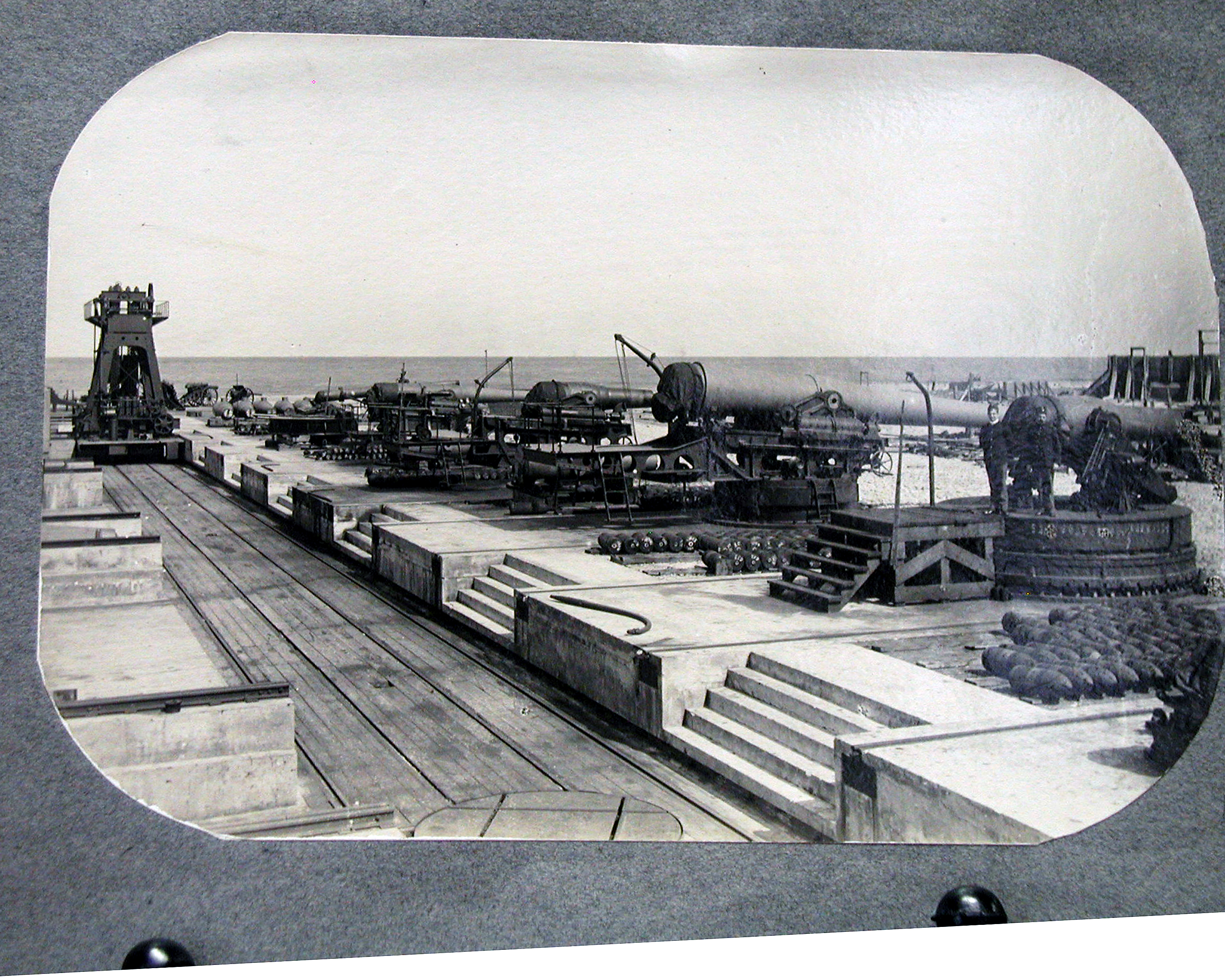
Proof battery at Sandy Hook Proving Ground, New Jersey where McNair served early in his career. A proof battery enabled testing with different types of artillery. The Sandy Hook firing range extended 3,000 yards (2,700 m) along the beach. For long range firing, the guns were aimed out to sea.

McNair was first assigned as a platoon leader with the 12th Battery of Mountain Artillery at Fort Douglas, Utah. While there, he requested duty with the Ordnance Department, and passed a qualifying examination. After approval of his transfer request, he was first assigned to Sandy Hook Proving Ground, New Jersey, where he began a lifelong interest in testing and experimenting with new equipment and weapons. Initially, McNair's Ordnance testing centered on improving the mountain guns used by units including his 12th Battery for artillery support of troops in rugged terrain where limbers and caissons could not travel.

After assignment to the staff of the Army's Chief of Ordnance from 1905 to 1906, McNair was assigned to the Watertown Arsenal, where he completed self-directed academic studies in metallurgy and other scientific topics. In this posting, he gained experience with both laboratory and practical methods of experimentation, including analyzing bronze, steel, and cast iron to determine the best materials to use in manufacturing cannons and other weapons. In addition, he gained firsthand experience with the uses and applications of several foundry machines, including forges, steam hammers, lathes, planing machines, and boring machines. His business college background in statistical analysis and engineering (including technical drawing) helped make him successful at testing and experimentation; as a result of his experience at Watertown, for the rest of his career the Army frequently relied on him to oversee boards that developed and tested weapons and other equipment, and made recommendations on which items were most suitable for procurement and fielding. He was promoted to temporary first lieutenant in July 1905, and permanent first lieutenant in January 1907. In May 1907, McNair was promoted to temporary captain. (His higher temporary ranks applied in the Ordnance branch, but not in the Artillery.)

== Pre-World War I ==
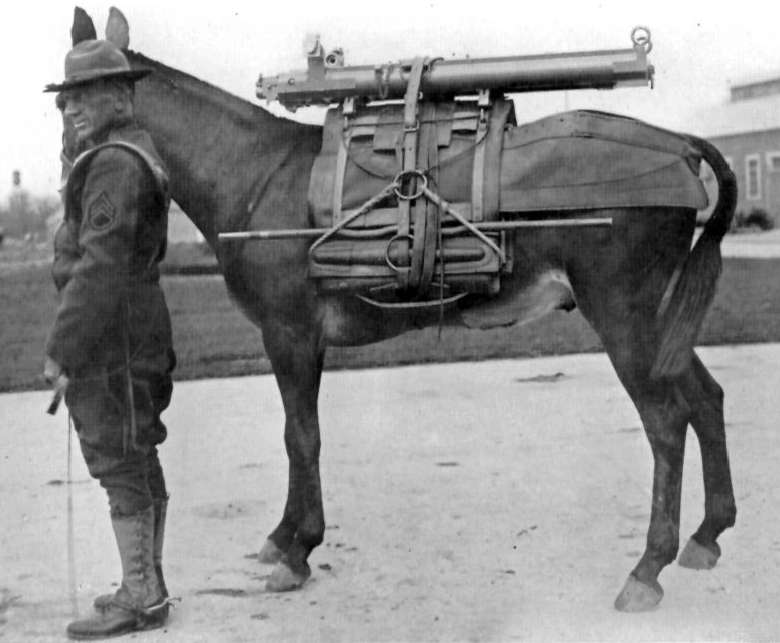
1921 photo of U.S. soldier and pack animal carrying components of a mountain howitzer. McNair designed and experimented with pack saddles and other mountain artillery equipment early in his career.

In 1909, McNair returned to the Artillery branch and was assigned to the 4th Field Artillery Regiment at Fort Russell, Wyoming. Assigned to command of Battery C, he earned accolades for his leadership skills and technical expertise. Jacob L. Devers, who was assigned to Battery C after his 1909 West Point graduation, recalled McNair as an outstanding commander who set a superior personal example, and knew how to motivate his subordinates to perform to a high standard. During his battery command, McNair also worked with mixed success on recommendations to modernize pack howitzers, pack saddles, ammunition carriers, and other equipment (much of it of his own design) for the Army's mule-transported mountain artillery. In 1909, McNair commanded the 4th Artillery's Battery D at Fort Riley, Kansas, during tests designed to determine the battle-worthiness of different types of defensive works if they were attacked by various types of cannons and howitzers. In 1911, he received three patents (998,711; 998,712; 1,007,223) for his designs of new artillery projectiles.

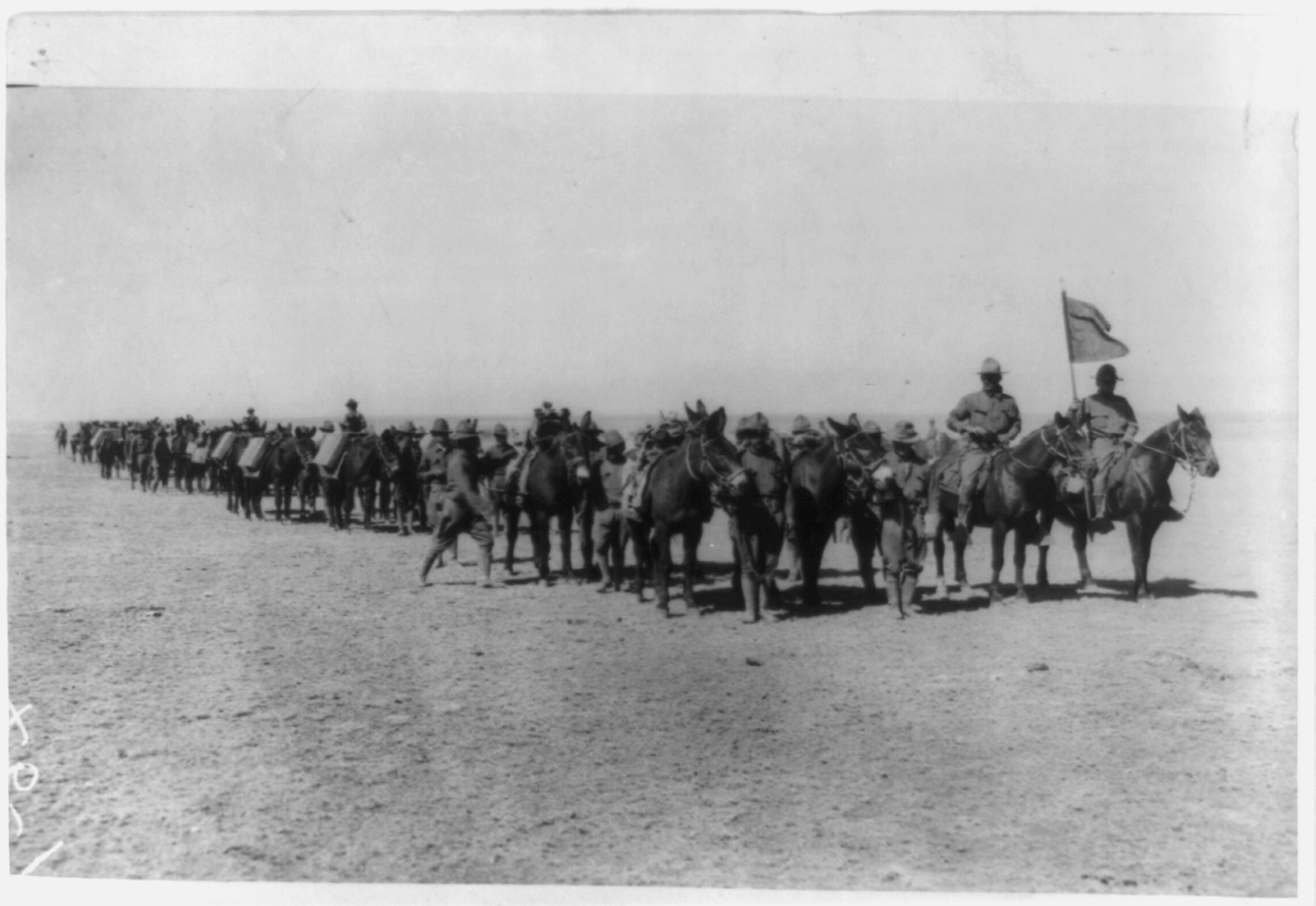
Battery C, 4th Field Artillery during the 1916 Pancho Villa Expedition. McNair commanded Battery C from 1909 to 1912.

McNair's skills in technical drawing, engineering, prototype building, and statistical analysis began to be known Army-wide; in 1912 the commandant of the Field Artillery School requested him by name for assignment to his staff. Instructors at the school had spent more than a year gathering information on 7,000 rounds fired during tests and field exercises; because the school was short-staffed, the commandant called on McNair to compile the data into firing tables that would make it easier for Artillery crews Army-wide to plan and control indirect fire. While carrying out this assignment in 1913, he also spent seven months in France to observe and gather information on the French Army's artillery training, education, and employment.

In April 1914, McNair was promoted to permanent captain, and from April to November 1914, McNair took part in the Battle of Veracruz as the 4th Field Artillery Regiment's commissary officer. Assigned following another by name request, this time from regimental commander Lucien Grant Berry, McNair was responsible for procuring, storing, maintaining, accounting for, and distributing the regiment's materiel, including equipment and weapons. During 1915 and 1916, he was again assigned to the Field Artillery School, where he continued to work on procedures for the implementation of the firing table data he had published. He also continued to experiment with different types of artillery pieces so he could make manufacturing and procurement recommendations as the Army began to prepare for possible involvement in World War I. He returned to the 4th Field Artillery Regiment for the Pancho Villa Expedition on the Texas-Mexico border; initially an unassigned staff officer available for additional duties, he later commanded a battery.

== World War I ==
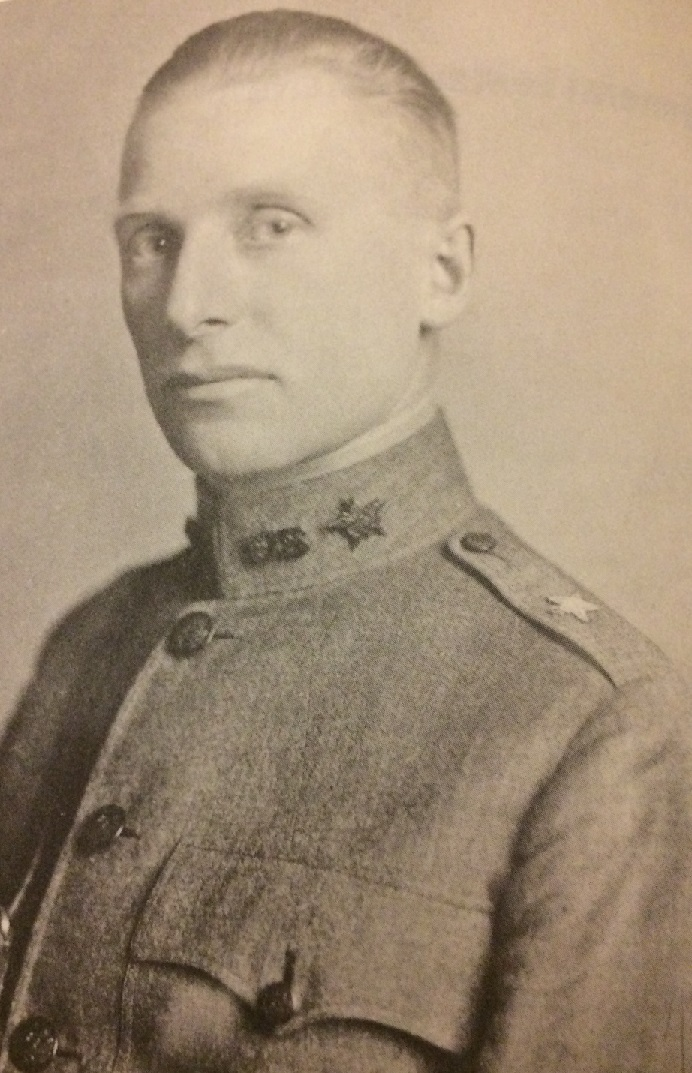
McNair as an AEF brigadier general, 1919

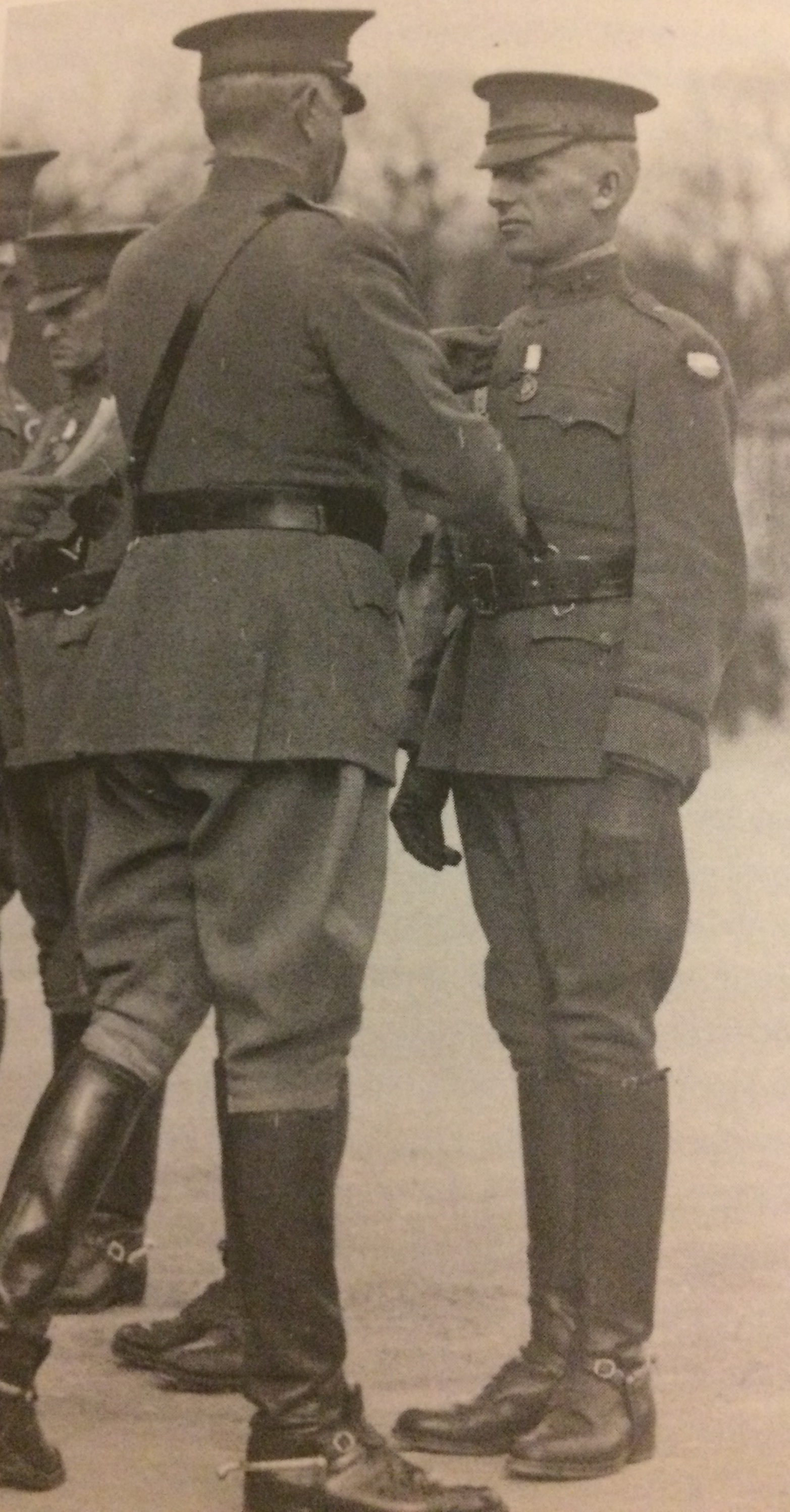
McNair receiving the Army DSM from General Pershing

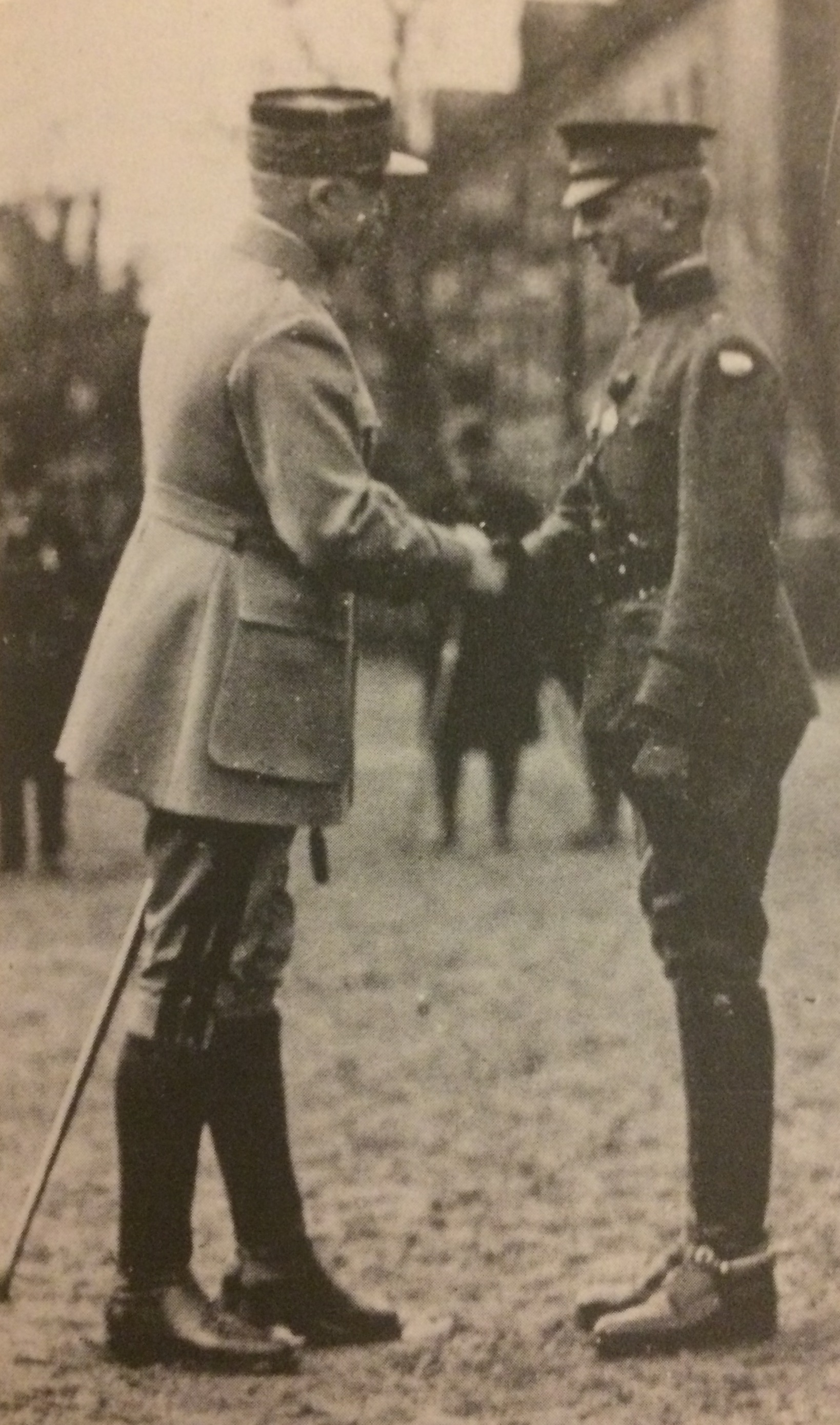
McNair receives the Legion of Honor from Pétain

In April 1917, the United States entered World War I. The next month, he was promoted to major and assigned to temporary duty as an instructor for the officer training camp at Leon Springs, Texas. After his Leon Springs assignment, McNair was assigned to the newly created 1st Division, then located at Camp Stewart, in El Paso County, Texas. Assigned to the division headquarters as assistant chief of staff for training, McNair was given responsibility for the organization's pre-deployment mobilization, individual soldier training, and collective unit training. When the division departed for France in June, McNair shared quarters aboard ship with the division's assistant chief of staff for operations, Captain George C. Marshall. During their long ocean voyage, they forged a personal and professional bond that they maintained for the rest of their careers.

McNair was promoted to temporary lieutenant colonel in August, soon after his arrival in France, and was assigned to the American Expeditionary Forces (AEF) headquarters as chief of artillery training and tactics in the AEF staff's training division (G-5). He was promoted to temporary colonel in June 1918, and temporary brigadier general that October; at age 35, he was the second-youngest general officer in the Army. (Pelham D. Glassford, a West Point classmate and fellow field artilleryman, was also promoted to brigadier general in October 1918, and he was three months younger than McNair.) He continued to impress his superiors with his technical and tactical expertise, and at the end of the war he received the Army Distinguished Service Medal from General John J. Pershing, the Commander-in-Chief (C-in-C) of the AEF, and the French Legion of Honor (Officer) from Philippe Pétain. The citation for the Army DSM reads:

The President of the United States of America, authorized by Act of Congress, 9 July 1918, takes pleasure in presenting the Army Distinguished Service Medal to Brigadier General Lesley James McNair, United States Army, for exceptionally meritorious and distinguished services to the Government of the United States, in a duty of great responsibility during World War I. As the Senior Artillery Officer of the Training Section, General Staff, General McNair displayed marked ability in correctly estimating the changing conditions and requirements of military tactics. He was largely responsible for impressing upon the American Army sound principles for the use of artillery and for improving methods for the support of Infantry, so necessary to the proper cooperation of the two arms.

The Armistice of 11 November 1918 ended the war, and McNair continued to serve in the post-war occupation of Germany. In June 1919, he was named to the AEF board that was charged with studying the problem of providing adequate mobile indirect fire support to infantry during combat. This panel, called the Lassiter Board after its chairman, Major General William Lassiter, was one of several formed by the AEF to review wartime plans and activities, and make recommendations for the Army's future equipment, doctrine, and training.

== Post-World War I ==
=== School of the Line ===
McNair remained with the Lassiter Board only briefly because he received orders assigning him as one of the faculty members of the Army's School of the Line. The school had ceased operations during the war and was being re-formed at Fort Leavenworth to offer professional education to field grade officers on planning and overseeing the execution of operations at division level and above. McNair reverted to his permanent rank of major, and remained on the faculty until 1921.

In addition to receiving accolades for his work to help design and field the course curriculum, McNair also played a key role in another task traditionally assigned to the School of the Line: developing and promulgating the Field Service Regulations, the Army's main document for codifying training and readiness doctrine. While on the School of the Line's faculty, he was one of the main authors of the 1923 revision of Field Service Regulations. The officers who were assigned to the faculty and were responsible for restarting the School of the Line after World War I all received credit for having attended the course, including McNair.

=== Hawaiian Department ===
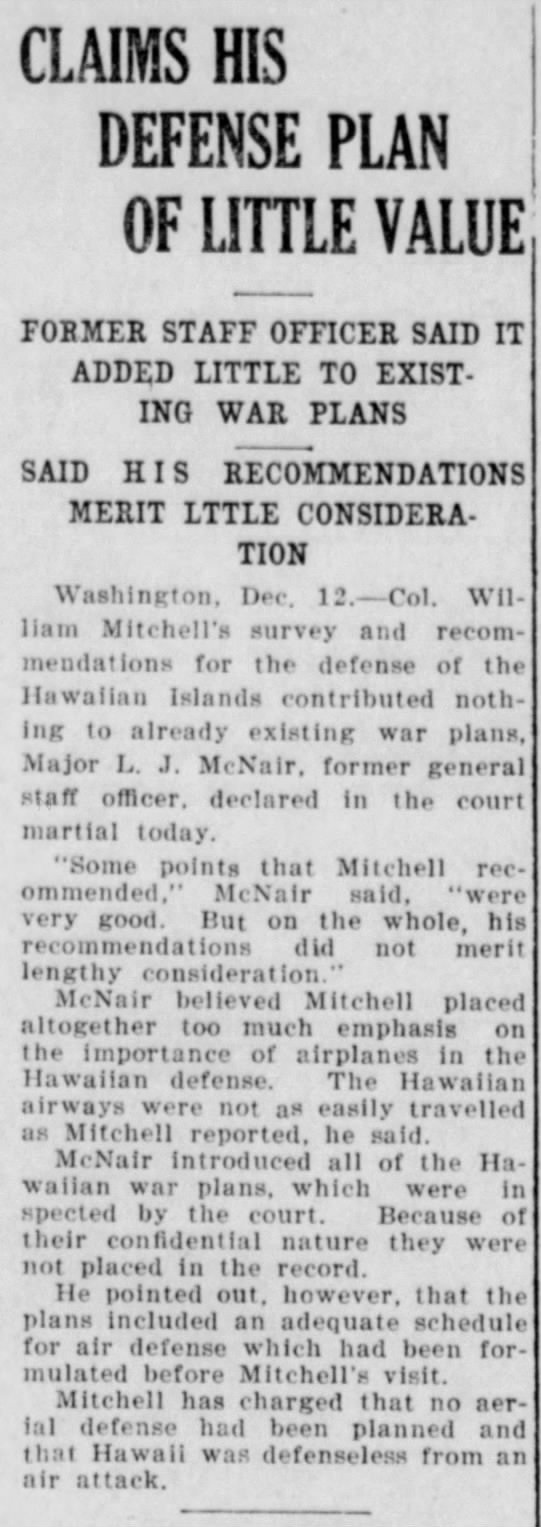
Newspaper account of McNair testimony at Billy Mitchell's 1925 court-martial

In 1921, McNair was posted to Fort Shafter and assigned as assistant chief of staff for operations (G-3) at the headquarters of the Army's Hawaiian Department. While in Hawaii, he became a participant in the Army's ongoing debate over the best methods for providing coastal defense, which engaged proponents of the Coast Artillery branch and Army Air Service. Assigned to the project by Hawaiian Department commander Major General Charles Pelot Summerall because of his reputation for objectivity in carrying out analysis and experimentation with military weapons and equipment, McNair created a committee made up of himself, two coast artillery officers, and an aviation officer to investigate the strengths and weaknesses of the two branches, especially with regard to defending Army and Navy bases on Oahu, and make recommendations on the best way to employ coast artillery and military aircraft.

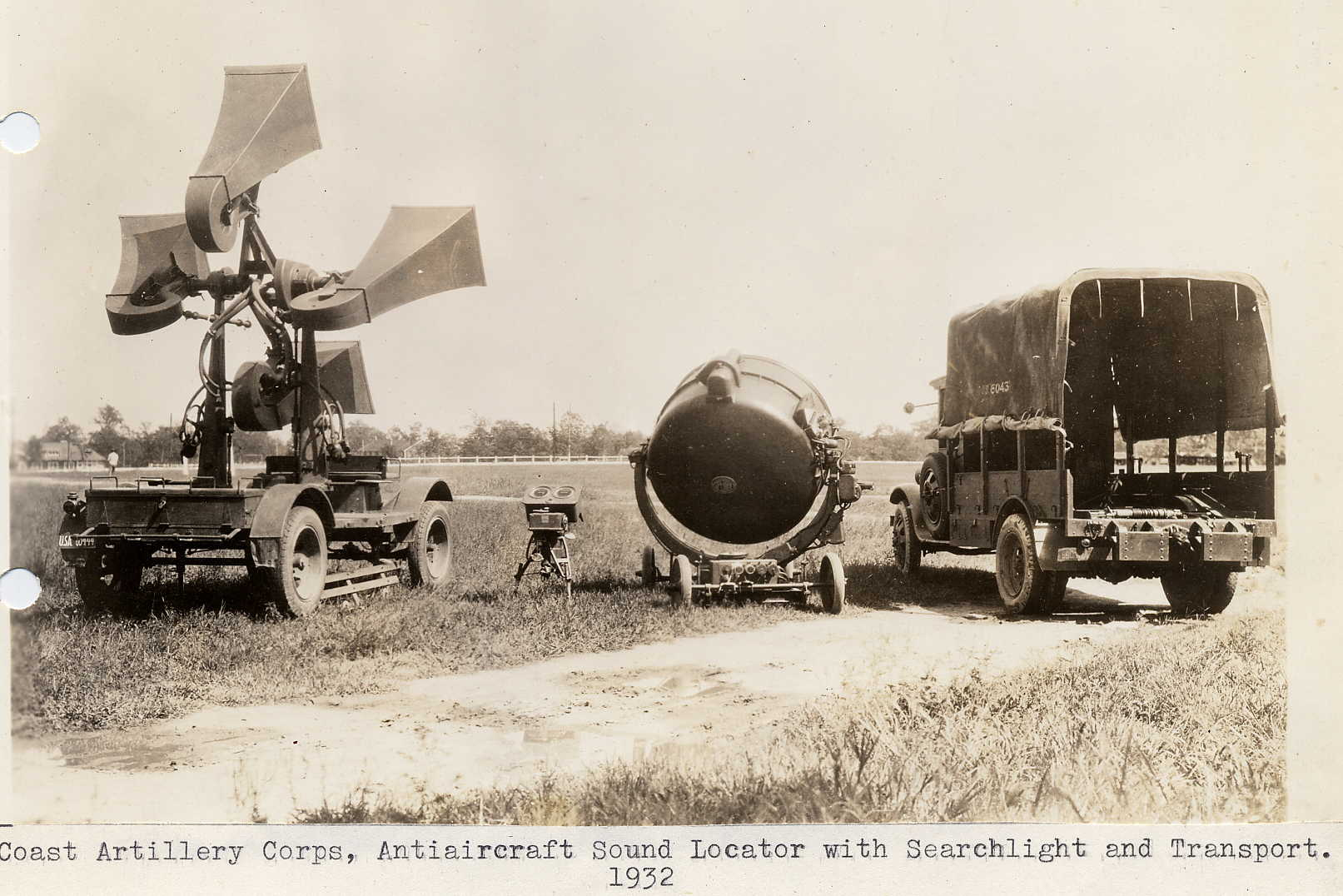
Coast Artillery sound locators and searchlight, 1932. McNair's report on defending the coasts of Hawaii indicated that sufficient sound detection and illumination equipment like this was critical to success.

The McNair board carried out numerous tests of coast artillery and bomber aircraft in a variety of conditions, and compiled tables and charts to depict the results. The panel concluded that coastal artillery was sufficient for shore defense, provided that adequate listening and lighting equipment for detecting and illuminating enemy ships and planes was available, and that bombers were less accurate, but more effective at destroying enemy ships at longer distances from shore, provided they could overcome obstacles including inclement weather.

In addition to his work on the coastal defense problem, McNair was also responsible for directing a review of War Plan Orange, the Army and Navy joint defense plan for countering an attack on Hawaii by Japan. This possibility was a major concern of U.S. military leaders during the years between World War I and World War II. Among McNair's contributions to updating this plan was the creation of several contingency plans ("branches and sequels" in Army parlance) to augment the main war plan. These contingency plans included: using chemical weapons to defend against a Japanese attack, declaring martial law in Hawaii, and determining how to maintain a defense against Japanese invaders while waiting for reinforcements from the U.S. mainland.

In 1924 and 1925, McNair and Summerall defended McNair's work when it was criticized during the continuing debate about the future of the Army Air Service. The head of the Air Service, Major General Mason Patrick, argued that the McNair board's findings underestimated the capabilities of bomber aircraft, and that the data the board had compiled was inaccurate. In response, Major General Frank W. Coe, the chief of the Coast Artillery Corps, pointed out that McNair's panel included both Coast Artillery and Air Service officers, and that experiments with aircraft had included coast artillery officers as observers. In addition, the aircrews that participated in the McNair board experiments had the opportunity to provide input and voice concern over the board's methods and conclusions. Coe concluded his argument by recommending that the McNair board's findings be approved by the Army as its official position on the issue of coastal artillery versus bombers for shore defense. Coe's recommendation was not followed; subsequent panels and committees continued to investigate and debate the issue. In addition, the debate continued on the larger question of whether the Air Service should remain a component of the Army or become a separate branch of the military.

McNair's involvement in the issue continued during the 1925 court-martial of Brigadier General Billy Mitchell, whose zealous advocacy of creating a separate Air Force resulted in accusations of insubordination. Mitchell based his public assertions about non-aviation officers being ignorant of aviation matters on events he falsely claimed to have witnessed in Hawaii during the McNair board's experiments. Summerall was so incensed at the questioning of his and McNair's integrity that he attempted to be appointed as president of the court-martial. During Mitchell's trial, Major General Robert Courtney Davis, the Army's adjutant general, ordered Summerall and McNair to provide testimony. They refuted Mitchell's claims that during his time in Hawaii in 1923 the Hawaiian Department had no plan to defend Oahu from Japanese attack. They also demonstrated that Mitchell was incorrect in stating that the Air Service was not treated fairly in the distribution of resources in Hawaii; in fact, Summerall had reallocated funding, equipment and other items from other branches to the Air Service. Mitchell was convicted, and sentenced to a five-year suspension from active duty. He resigned from the Army so he could continue to advocate for the creation of a separate Air Force. Despite the controversy, McNair's work enhanced his reputation as an objective and innovative thinker, planner, and leader, and he remained under consideration for positions of increasing rank and responsibility.

=== Purdue University ===
In 1924, McNair was appointed commandant and professor of military science and tactics for the Reserve Officers' Training Corps (ROTC) program at Purdue University. In accordance with the National Defense Act of 1920, ROTC offered a two-year course of instruction for freshmen and sophomores, which was compulsory at many universities, including Purdue. The program also offered advanced instruction for juniors and seniors who desired to continue military training and possibly earn a commission in the Army Reserve, National Guard, or Regular Army. In addition to following this academic model, since 1919 Purdue had organized its ROTC cadets as a motorized field artillery unit, a circumstance which played to McNair's strengths.

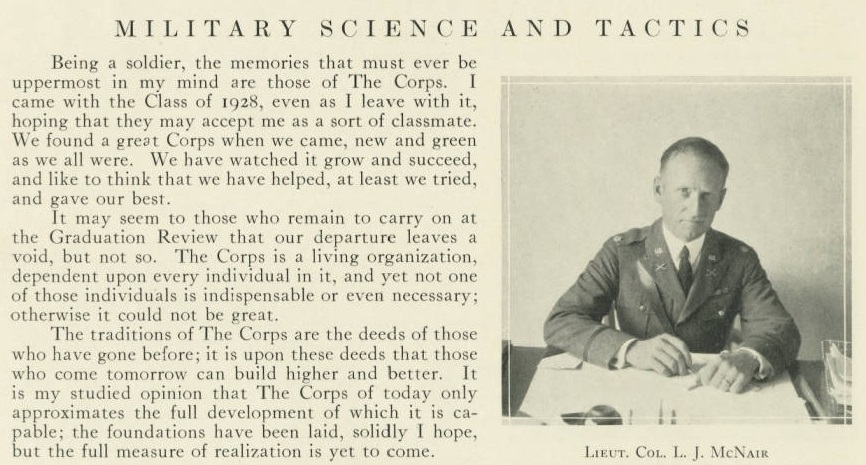
McNair's profile in the Purdue University yearbook for 1928

Purdue's president, Edward C. Elliott, was a strong advocate at the national level for ROTC, and a leading voice in opposition to the pacifist movement which gained strength and influence following World War I. McNair became an advocate for military preparedness generally and ROTC specifically, and also argued in opposition to the pacifists. Already a prolific author of professional journal articles on technical military subjects, he penned numerous articles and letters in favor of military training and readiness, and in opposition to the pacifist movement. He also continued to write on Army-specific subjects, including articles that argued for reforming the Army's officer promotion system to replace seniority with merit as the primary consideration.

McNair also effected several positive changes to Purdue's ROTC program. As outlined by Elliott, Purdue ROTC had been the subject of several rapid leadership changes which had resulted in disorganization and low morale. McNair's leadership, technical expertise, and administrative abilities resulted in enhanced student participation and improved morale, and developed the program into the Army's largest light artillery unit. When the Chief of Field Artillery attempted to reassign McNair to Fort Bragg, North Carolina, to lead revisions to the Army's field artillery regulations, Elliott protested; his request to keep McNair until the end of the usual four-year assignment for ROTC professors was granted, and McNair remained at Purdue until 1928.

=== Army War College ===
In 1928, McNair was promoted to lieutenant colonel and entered the United States Army War College, the highest-level formal education program for Army officers. In the 1920s the curriculum had been revised so that the program of instruction concentrated on economic, industrial, and logistics issues related to large-scale wartime mobilizations, as well as the doctrine, strategy, and tactics requirements associated with organizing, training, deploying, and employing large scale units for combat (typically division and above). In addition to completing seminars on staff functions (G-1 for personnel, G-2 for intelligence, G-3 for operations and training, and G-4 for logistics), McNair and his War College classmates served on committees that studied war plans and suggested improvements, reviewed regulations and proposed updates, and studied and discussed strategic-level foreign and defense policy issues to improve their understanding. Among his classmates were several officers who became prominent during World War II, including: Simon Bolivar Buckner Jr., Roy Geiger, Oscar Griswold, Clarence R. Huebner, Troy H. Middleton, and Franklin C. Sibert.

Upon graduating, McNair received an evaluation of "superior", with a recommendation from the commandant that he be considered for high command or a senior position on the War Department General Staff. In addition, the commandant forwarded to the War Department McNair's final research project on ways for the department to maximize efficiency when allocating funding for unit training, calling it "a study of exceptional merit made at the War College".

=== U.S. Army Field Artillery School ===
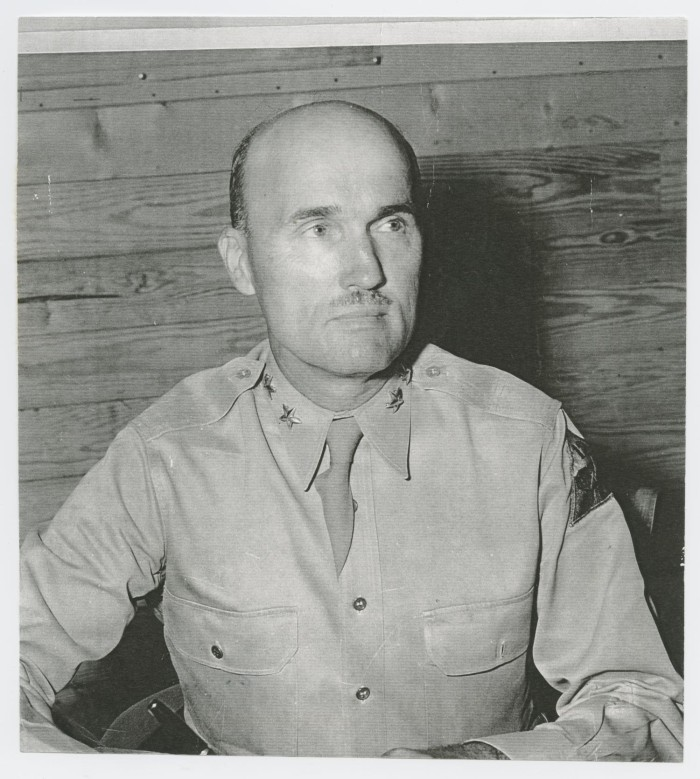
Carlos Brewer, one of three successive chiefs of the Artillery School Gunnery Department who experimented on indirect fire techniques with McNair's support

After his War College graduation, McNair was assigned as assistant commandant of the Field Artillery Center and School. In this position, he worked with the school's Gunnery Department to address field artillery doctrine issues that had lingered since World War I, including limited mobility, inadequate communications, and overly detailed fire direction techniques. Successive Gunnery Department directors Jacob Devers, Carlos Brewer, and Orlando Ward recognized that continuing improvement to innovations including machine guns and tanks made the static trench warfare of World War I unlikely to be repeated. As a result, they experimented with new techniques, including increasing the speed of artillery support to mobile armor and infantry by empowering Artillery-qualified fire support officers attached to those formations to direct artillery fire. In addition, they pioneered techniques to enhance accuracy, including forward observers (FOs) who could direct rounds onto targets based on seeing their impact, rather than the unobserved timed fire and rolling barrages that had prevailed in World War I. McNair supported these innovations, and prevented interference from senior officers who tried to block them.

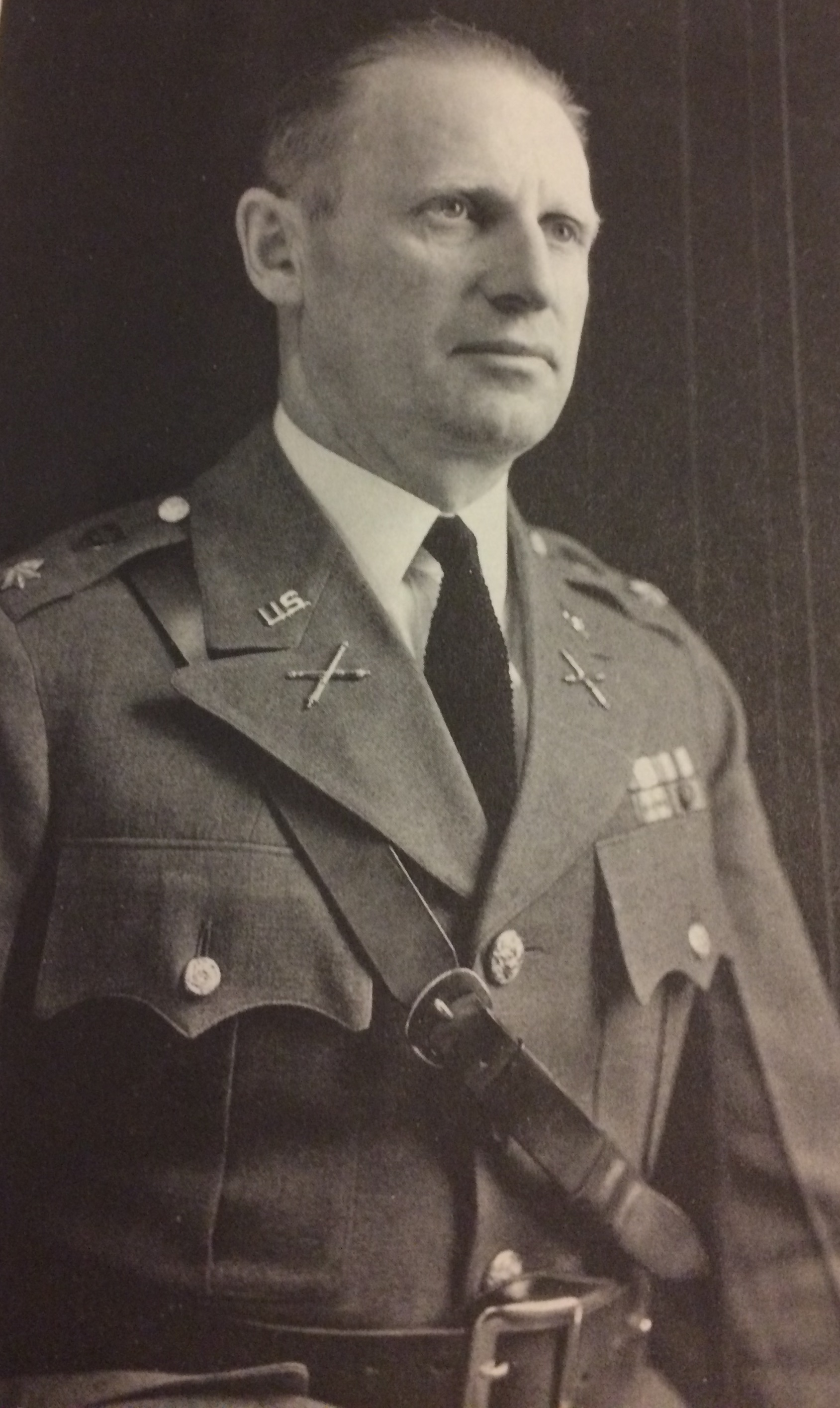
McNair as Assistant Commandant of Ft. Sill in 1929

Devers, Brewer, and Ward also argued for directing artillery from the battalion level rather than the battery level. In their view, massing artillery and centrally controlling it from a brigade fire direction center (FDC) enabled senior commanders to rapidly provide direct support to the areas on the battlefield where it was most needed. McNair had advocated this tactic since World War I; he again agreed with the Gunnery Department, and worked to help implement this doctrinal change while also protecting the Gunnery Department from outside interference. Over time, improvements to communications equipment and procedures and changes to doctrine enabled implementation of many of these changes, and they largely became the standard by which field artillery units conducted operations in World War II.

At the completion of McNair's assignment as deputy commandant in 1933, he received the highest marks on his efficiency report, along with recommendations for promotion to colonel, and assignment to regimental or brigade command.

=== Battalion command ===
McNair commanded 2nd Battalion, 16th Field Artillery Regiment at Fort Bragg from 1 July through 1 October 1933, when organizational changes re-designated the unit as 2nd Battalion, 83rd Field Artillery Regiment. McNair commanded the renamed unit until August 1934, and led it through its renaming and reorganization.

=== Civilian Conservation Corps ===
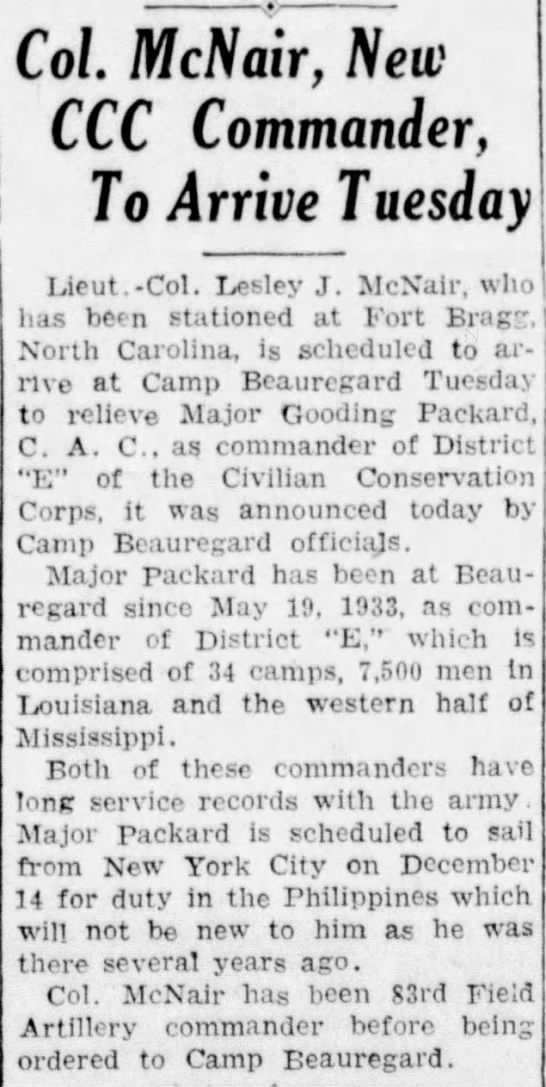
Article announcing McNair as Louisiana area CCC Commander

In August 1934, McNair was assigned to command of Civilian Conservation Corps (CCC) District E, part of the Seventh Corps Area. Headquartered at Camp Beauregard, Louisiana, District E was composed of thousands of CCC members based at 33 camps throughout Louisiana and Mississippi. As with other Regular Army officers who took part in organizing and operating the CCC, McNair's work to plan, direct, and supervise the activities over a wide area gave him practical experience at mobilizing, housing, feeding, providing medical care for, supervising, and improving the physical and mental resilience of thousands of young members. This experience working with large bodies of men was an asset as McNair ascended into the Army's senior ranks. In addition, McNair benefited from the experience of working with civilian government leaders to plan and direct CCC activities, which was also put to good use in his later assignments as one of the Army's highest-level commanders. He was promoted to colonel in May 1935.

=== Executive officer to the Chief of Field Artillery ===
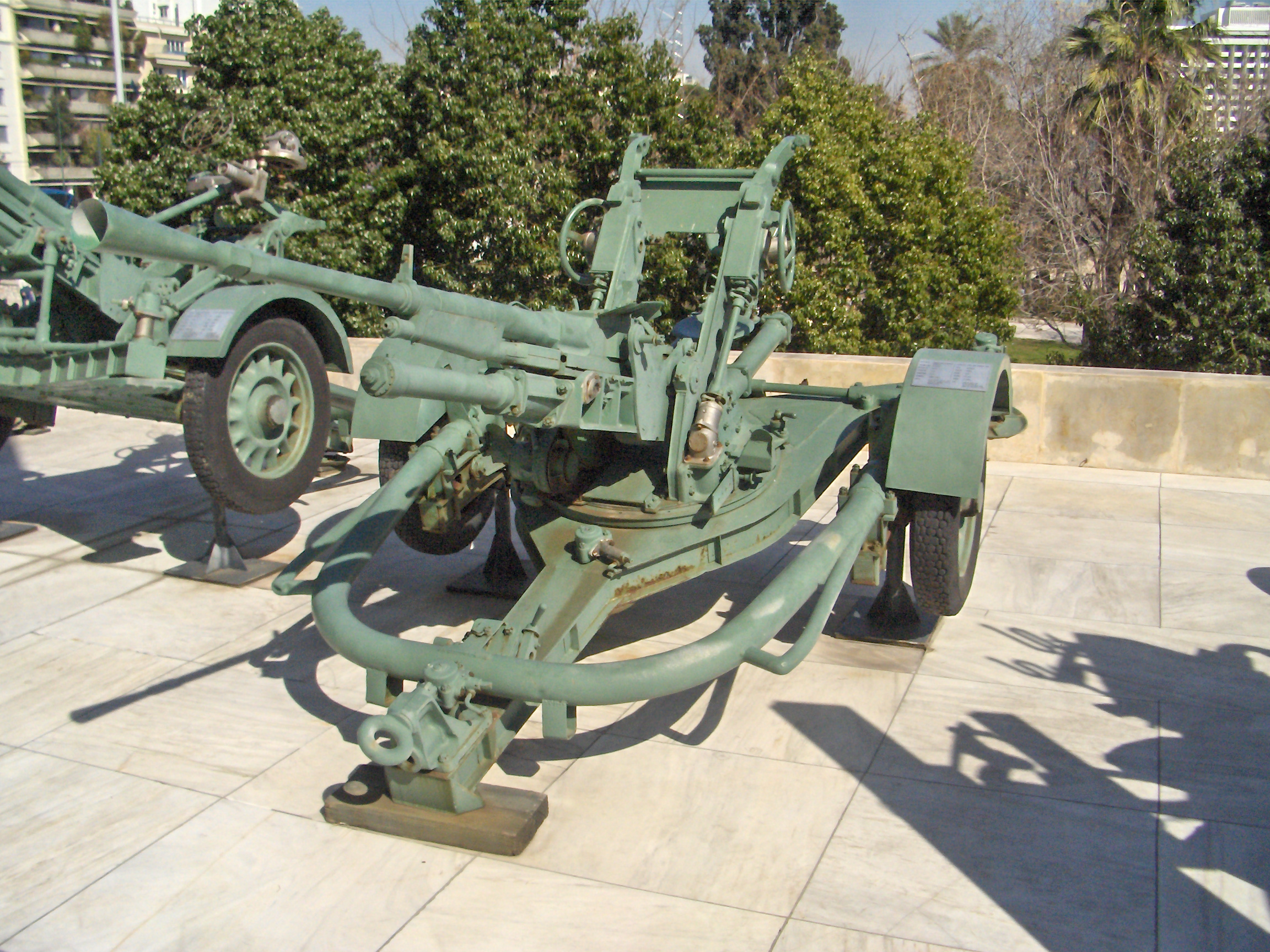
25 mm Hotchkiss anti-aircraft gun. McNair experimented with Hotchkiss anti-tank and anti-aircraft guns while assigned to the office of the Chief of Field Artillery.

With his promotion to colonel, McNair was assigned as executive officer for the Army's Chief of Field Artillery. In addition to carrying out the usual administrative duties of the position, such as managing the chief's appointment calendar and handling his correspondence, McNair was able to continue experimenting with and testing field artillery equipment and weapons, including trips to Aberdeen Proving Ground in Maryland to test the Hotchkiss Anti-Tank Gun and Hotchkiss Anti-Aircraft Gun. He also studied and authored articles on the use of autogyros for field artillery targeting and indirect fire observation, which anticipated the use of helicopters in modern warfare. In January 1937, McNair was promoted to brigadier general.

=== Brigade command ===
In March 1937, McNair was assigned to command of the 2nd Field Artillery Brigade, a unit of the 2nd Infantry Division, then based at Fort Sam Houston, Texas. The Army continued to experiment with equipment, weapons, and organizational design as it moved towards mechanization and modernization; the Army Chief of Staff directed tests of the triangular division concept (as opposed to the square division of World War I) through creation of a Proposed Infantry Division (PID). The 2nd Infantry Division was selected to conduct the tests, and McNair performed additional duty as the PID's chief of staff. In this position, he managed and supervised the PID's design, field tests, after-action reviews, and reports and recommendations to the War Department.

The triangular division model was adopted, and became the Army's standard design for infantry divisions in World War II. In his annual performance appraisal, his division commander, Major General James K. Parsons, rated McNair as superior, and recommended him for assignment as a corps or army chief of staff. On the question of how McNair compared to his peers (unique to the appraisals of general officers), Parsons rated McNair second of the 40 generals personally known to him. McNair remained in command of the 2nd Field Artillery Brigade until March 1939, when he was appointed to serve as commandant of the Command and General Staff College.

=== Command and General Staff College ===
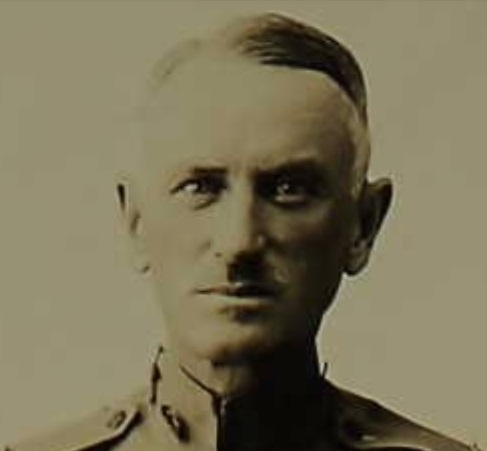
As commander of the Seventh Corps Area, Percy P. Bishop evaluated McNair's command of Ft. Leavenworth and ranked him first of more than 30 brigadier generals he knew personally. McNair routinely received the highest possible ratings on his performance appraisals.

The Chief of Staff of the Army, General Malin Craig, selected McNair to command the Command and General Staff College because he believed its teaching methods needed to be updated, and that the combat unit planning and reporting processes it taught needed to be streamlined. Craig felt that McNair's background made him ideally suited to lead this effort; in addition, Craig's deputy, Brigadier General George Marshall, believed that the Command and General Staff College program of instruction was too rigid and too focused on a staff process geared towards leadership of Regular Army units. In Marshall's view, the curriculum needed to be overhauled to reflect the likely needs of the World War II army, including faster, more flexible methods for planning and execution of large scale mobilizations, and incorporation of processes for training draftees and members of the National Guard, who would report for duty with less training and experience than members of the Regular Army. In addition, Marshall wanted to ensure that graduates were prepared to plan and execute the offensive maneuver-based operations Army leaders anticipated would characterize World War II, as opposed to the defensive trench warfare of World War I.

In addition to modernizing the curriculum, McNair reduced the course length to accommodate the civilian schedules of National Guard and Reserve officers, many of whom would otherwise be unable to attend. While working to update and streamline the curriculum, McNair updated the Army's core doctrine, the Field Service Manual. He began his service as commandant in time to finalize publication of the 1939 edition, which was divided into three Field Manuals (FMs): FM 100–5, Operations; FM 100–10, Administration; and FM 100–15, Large Units. Because of criticism of the 1939 edition, McNair almost immediately began work on an update, with Marshall, now the Army's chief of staff, directing that it be published no later than 1 January 1941. The work on the 1941 edition was still in progress when McNair was again reassigned; when it was published it became the primary doctrinal document for the Army's World War II activities. His efficiency reports continued to reflect his superior performance; for the first appraisal he received while commandant, Craig rated McNair second of the 41 brigadier generals he knew. In an evaluation of his performance in his additional duty as commander of the Fort Leavenworth post, Major General Percy Poe Bishop, commander of the Seventh Corps Area, ranked McNair fifth of the 31 brigadier generals he knew. By the time of his second appraisal as commandant, the War Department had waived the requirement for written evaluations of officers supervised directly by the Army Chief of Staff, but in his second role as commander of Fort Leavenworth, Bishop rated McNair as superior in all areas, recommended him for a high level command in combat, and ranked him first of the more than 30 brigadier generals Bishop knew.

== World War II ==
=== General Headquarters, United States Army ===
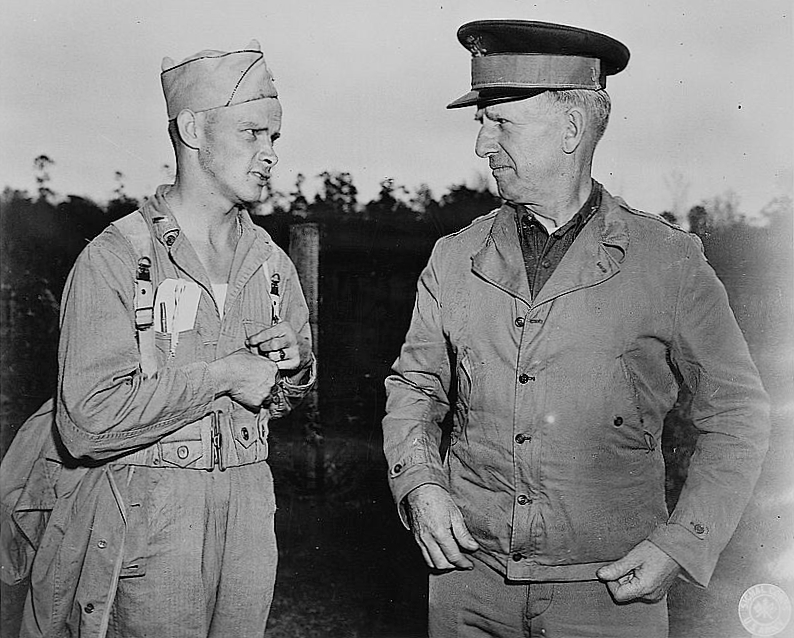
McNair confers with an umpire during the Louisiana Maneuvers.

In July 1940, McNair began his new assignment as chief of staff for General Headquarters, United States Army (GHQ), the organization the Army created to oversee World War II mobilization, organization, equipping, and training. Marshall was appointed to command GHQ in addition to his duties as Chief of Staff of the Army; in order to concentrate on his primary role, he largely delegated responsibility for running GHQ to McNair. As part of this working relationship, Marshall provided McNair broad advice and guidance, and McNair obtained approval from Marshall for the most important decisions. As GHQ's responsibilities increased following U.S. entry into the war, McNair's responsibilities were encroached upon by members of the War Department staff; for instance, the logistics staff section (G-4) retained authority over corps area commands in matters involving billeting, equipping, and supplying soldiers undergoing mobilization training, which limited GHQ's ability to plan them and oversee their execution.

In response, McNair proposed establishing GHQ's unity of command over the Army's four field armies and eight corps areas; under his concept, each corps area headquarters would have responsibility for all administrative functions within their areas of responsibility, enabling GHQ and the field armies, corps, and divisions to focus on organizing, training, and administering the mobilized troop units that were preparing to go overseas. Though Marshall was initially receptive, members of the War Department General Staff disagreed with McNair's proposal, and Marshall concurred with them.

The small GHQ staff Marshall assembled included representatives from each of the Army's major field branches – Infantry, Field Artillery, Cavalry, Coast Artillery, Armor, Engineers, and Signal, along with liaison officers representing the National Guard and Army Reserve. As operations tempo increased, the staff expanded to include functional area representatives (G-1, G-2, G-3, and G-4). Among the individuals who served on the GHQ staff were Lloyd D. Brown, who later succeeded Omar Bradley as commander of the 28th Infantry Division, and Mark W. Clark, who went on to command the 15th Army Group. McNair's National Guard liaison was Kenneth Buchanan, who later served as assistant division commander of both the 28th and 9th Infantry Divisions, and commanded the Illinois National Guard as a major general after the war.

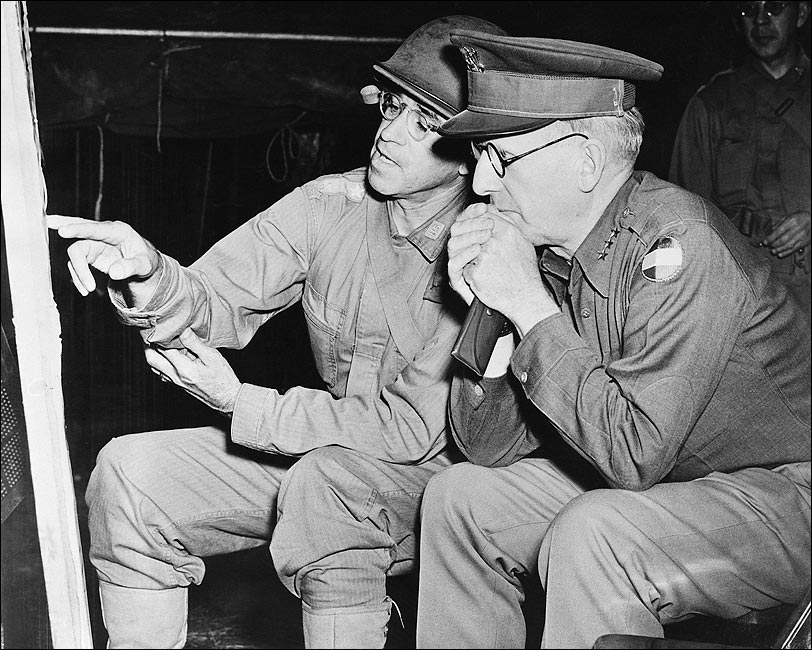
McNair listens as Omar Bradley explains a scenario at the Louisiana Maneuvers.

As GHQ chief of staff, McNair played a leading role in planning and conducting the 1940 and 1941 Louisiana Maneuvers and Carolina Maneuvers, large scale war games that enabled the Army to observe and draw conclusions with respect to training, doctrine, leadership, and other items of interest, which in turn led to changes in doctrine, equipment, and weapons. In addition, these maneuvers were used to identify which senior officers were most capable, enabling the Army to assign the best performers to command and top level staff positions, and relieve or reassign those perceived as less capable. McNair was promoted to temporary major general in September 1940, and temporary lieutenant general in June 1941.

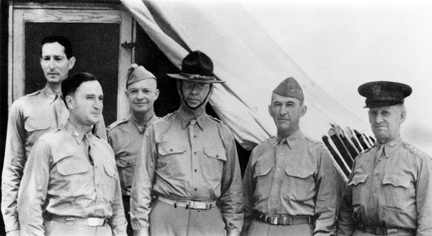
Senior officers during the Louisiana maneuvers. Left to right: Mark W. Clark, Chief of Staff, Army Ground Forces; Harry J. Malony, Chief of Staff, Second Army; Dwight D. Eisenhower, Chief of Staff, Third Army; Ben Lear, Commander Second Army; Walter Krueger, Commander Third Army; Lesley J. McNair, Commander Army Ground Forces

The War Department also assigned GHQ operational responsibilities, including planning for the defenses of facilities in Iceland, Greenland, and Alaska. McNair generally delegated the responsibility for this aspect of GHQ activities to his deputy, Brigadier General Harry J. Malony, so that he could concentrate on GHQ's organizational and training responsibilities, but maintained overall control of each role. McNair established the GHQ on the site of the Army War College (now the location of the National War College) at Washington Barracks (now Fort Lesley J. McNair), as the college had been closed for the duration of the war. McNair continued to command Army Ground Forces from this location rather than moving into the Pentagon when its construction was completed in 1943.

=== Army Ground Forces ===
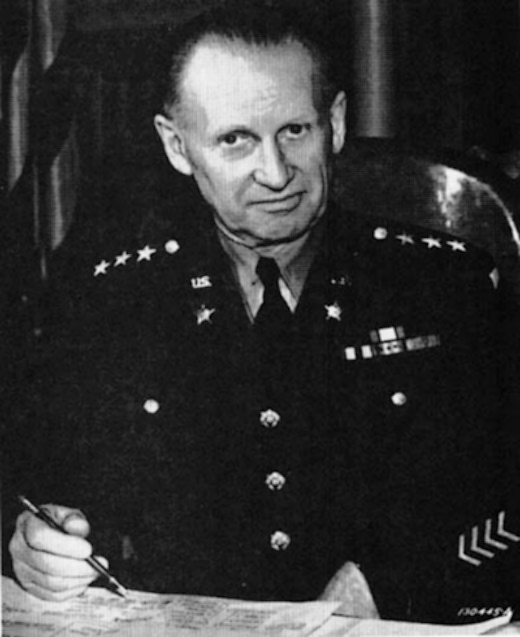
McNair at his desk while commanding Army Ground Forces

==== AGF creation and operations ====
In March 1942, the Army eliminated the General Headquarters in favor of three new functional commands: Army Ground Forces (AGF), commanded by McNair; the Army Air Forces (AAF), commanded by Lieutenant General Henry H. Arnold; and the Services of Supply (later the Army Service Forces or ASF), commanded by Lieutenant General Brehon B. Somervell. McNair's task at AGF was to expand the Army's ground forces from their March 1942 strength of 780,000 officers and men to more than 2.2 million by July 1943, and more than 8 million by 1945. His duties grew significantly, and included all Army boards, formal schools, training centers, and mobilization camps, as well as special activities having to do with the four combat arms (Infantry, Field Artillery, Cavalry, and Coast Artillery). As part of this reorganization, the Army eliminated the branch chief positions which had been responsible for these arms, transferring their authority to McNair. In addition, he had authority over four new "quasi-arms" which did not fall under the traditional combat arms – Airborne, Armor, Tank Destroyer, and Antiaircraft Artillery.

The Army intended for this reorganization to end inter-branch rivalries and competition for pre-eminence and resources; in fact it met with mixed success as advocates for each branch continued to argue among themselves. Additionally, competition for authority and resources also emerged between the War Department General Staff and the three functional commands, and between the functional commands themselves. Used to working with minimal delegation, and functioning with a small staff, McNair largely concentrated on the task at hand, and avoided the rivalries as much as possible. Despite this approach, he was still involved in controversies with the other functional commands, including an ongoing rivalry over allocation of the best qualified recruits and draftees.

==== Personnel recruiting and training ====
===== Training =====
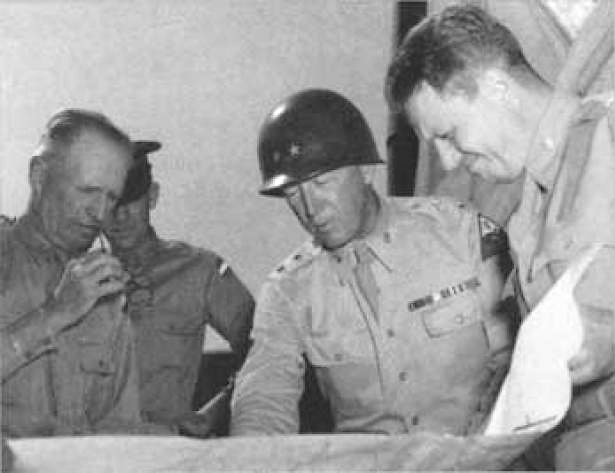
McNair and George S. Patton, commander of I Armored Corps review map during training exercise at Desert Training Center, 1942

McNair organized and supervised instruction in basic soldiering skills, to help individuals become proficient generalists prepared for more complex unit training. Once individuals were qualified, units carried out collective training, beginning with the lowest level, and continuing to build through successive echelons until divisions, corps, and armies were capable of carrying out large scale simulated force-against-force exercises. He insisted that training be conducted in realistic conditions, including the use of live ammunition, or simulators that replicated live ammunition, so that soldiers and commanders would be prepared to fight once they deployed overseas.

===== National Guard =====
McNair had difficulty implementing a training program for National Guard units, chiefly because of their lack of prior military experience other than monthly drills and short annual training periods. He recommended a wholesale demobilization of the National Guard; Marshall and the Secretary of War disagreed, partly because they anticipated political backlash, and partly because the manpower they provided was in demand. McNair also found National Guard senior commanders wanting; in his view, National Guard officers should not progress beyond the grade of colonel, and professional full-time officers should command at the division level and above. In this, he was mostly successful; all but two National Guard division commanders were replaced by regular Army officers, and most National Guard generals carried out stateside assignments, or non-combat overseas assignments. Some served in roles below division commander (such as assistant division commander), or carried out administrative and training roles, such as provost marshal or school commandant. In addition, some accepted reductions in rank so they could serve in overseas assignments.

===== Fielding army divisions =====
Original War Department estimates called for the Army to raise, equip, train, and deploy as many as 350 divisions. Later estimates revised this number downward to between 200 and 220. One factor that enabled this downward revision was that U.S. divisions were better equipped in some areas of their organizations than those of their adversaries, particularly later in the war; for example, every type of U.S. division was completely motorized or mechanized, while equivalent German divisions often relied on as many as 4,000 horses for transporting soldiers, supplies, and artillery. A variety of other factors, including the entry of the Soviet Union into the war on the side of the Allies after Adolf Hitler broke his non-aggression pact with Joseph Stalin by launching Operation Barbarossa, the need to ensure that enough farmers and agricultural workers were available for food production, and the need to maintain a U.S. workforce large enough to handle the production of weapons, vehicles, ammunition, and other equipment caused Army Chief of Staff Marshall to decide that maintaining the Army's ground combat strength at 90 divisions would strike the balance between too few soldiers to defeat the Axis powers, and so many that there were not enough civilians in the U.S. workforce.

To accomplish this goal, McNair and the AGF staff created new division manning and equipping tables, which reduced the number of soldiers required to man a division. This initiative had accomplished Marshall's goal by 1945, enabling the Army to field 89 divisions with the same number of soldiers it would have required to man only 73 divisions in 1943.

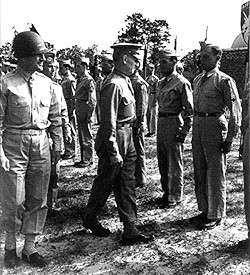
Major General Elbridge Chapman (left), commander of the 13th Airborne Division, and Lieutenant General Lesley J. McNair, commander of Army Ground Forces, inspect troopers of Elbridge's division, 13 May 1944.

The Army's effort to create and field a number of divisions sufficient to achieve victory also included the creation of airborne units. The Army had begun testing and experimenting with airborne formations in 1940; by 1943, William C. Lee, an early proponent of airborne forces, had convinced McNair of the need for division-sized airborne organizations. Though McNair and a few other Army leaders sometimes advocated for creation of all-purpose light divisions that could be adapted for unique missions, the Army did create some specialized divisions, including airborne. This initiative included activating the Airborne Command to oversee the organization and training of airborne units, conversion of the 82nd and 101st Infantry Divisions to airborne, and preparation of these divisions for paratrooper and glider missions in Europe.

Another initiative McNair incorporated into the effort to field the Army's World War II division was the creation of light divisions. Recognizing that the rugged terrain of the Italian mountains and Pacific jungles required specialized units, the AGF reorganized three existing divisions as the 89th Light Division (Truck), 10th Light Division (Pack, Alpine), and 71st Light Division (Pack, Jungle). The results of pre-deployment training demonstrated that the 71st and 89th Divisions were too small to sustain themselves in combat, so they were converted back to regular infantry divisions. The 10th Division's early training results were also less than encouraging, but its identity as a mountain division was retained, and after completing training it served in combat in the Italian mountains.

Overall, the Army's wartime division organization and reorganizations have been judged a success by historians, in that they provided an adequate number of units to win the war, while ensuring that agricultural and industrial production could continue.

===== Individual replacement system =====
As AGF commander, McNair worked to solve the problem of how to integrate replacement soldiers into units that had sustained casualties. Rather than adopt the model of replacing units that had sustained high casualties with new, full strength units, Marshall and McNair cited the need to allocate space on transport ships to equipment and supplies as the reason to provide individual replacement soldiers to units while the units remained in combat. In practice, the individual replacement system caused difficulties for both the replacement soldiers and the units they joined, especially during later stages of the war. New soldiers could have difficulty being accepted by the veterans of their units, since they were replacing buddies who had been killed or wounded, and had not shared the veterans' combat experiences. In addition, because new soldiers joined units that were already in the fight, there was often no time to teach them the tactics and techniques that increased their chances of surviving on the battlefield.

Though soldiers were supposed to be allocated to requesting units from replacement depots based on their qualifications and the priority of the unit, McNair found that in practice many commanders in the combat theaters used replacement soldiers to form new units, or personally selected individual replacements from personnel centers without regard to their qualifications. Assigning soldiers to units for which they were not qualified, such as armor crewmen to infantry units, negated the training they had received before going overseas. To address these concerns, McNair advocated faster qualification of replacement soldiers by reducing their training from 24 weeks to 13. The War Department reduced the training requirement to 17 weeks, but mandated continued use of the individual replacement system.

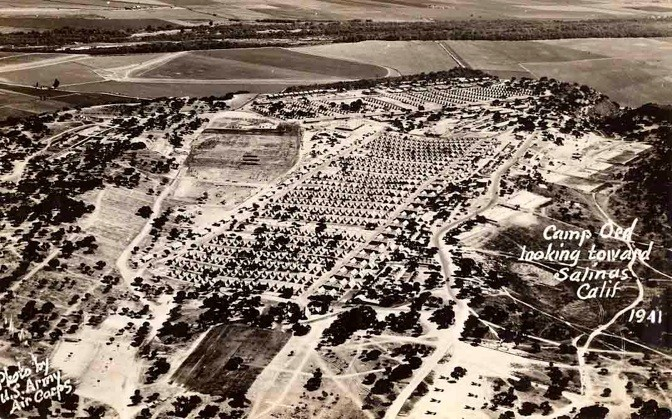
Fort Ord, California, 1941. The AGF established WWII personnel replacement centers at Fort Ord and Fort Meade, Maryland.

Because the AGF had responsibility for implementing the individual replacement system, McNair attempted improvements, including directing the establishment of the Classification and Replacement Division within his command, and streamlining the physical, psychological, and mental criteria used to determine fitness for service. Issues with the ASF's management of replacement centers within the United States led AGF to establish two new ones at Fort Meade, Maryland, and Fort Ord, California. Because infantry soldiers suffered disproportionately high casualties in combat, McNair argued for, but only partially succeeded in procuring recruits and draftees deemed high quality (typically those with the most education and highest aptitude test scores) for the AGF. In addition, he undertook several initiatives to improve the morale and esprit de corps of infantry soldiers, and enhance the goodwill of the civilian population towards the infantry, including creation of the Expert Infantryman Badge, and implementation of the "Soldier for a Day Initiative", which gave civilian government and business leaders the opportunity to interact with mobilized soldiers before they left the United States for combat assignments.

These initiatives were not always successful; by late 1944 and early 1945, the number of units fighting continuously or nearly continuously caused the replacement system to break down. As a result, rear echelon soldiers were often pulled from their duties to fill vacancies in front line combat units, and training for some replacement soldiers and units was cut short so they could be rushed into combat. Some units were worn down to the point of combat ineffectiveness. In others, low morale, fatigue, and sickness became more prevalent.

===== Recruitment efforts =====
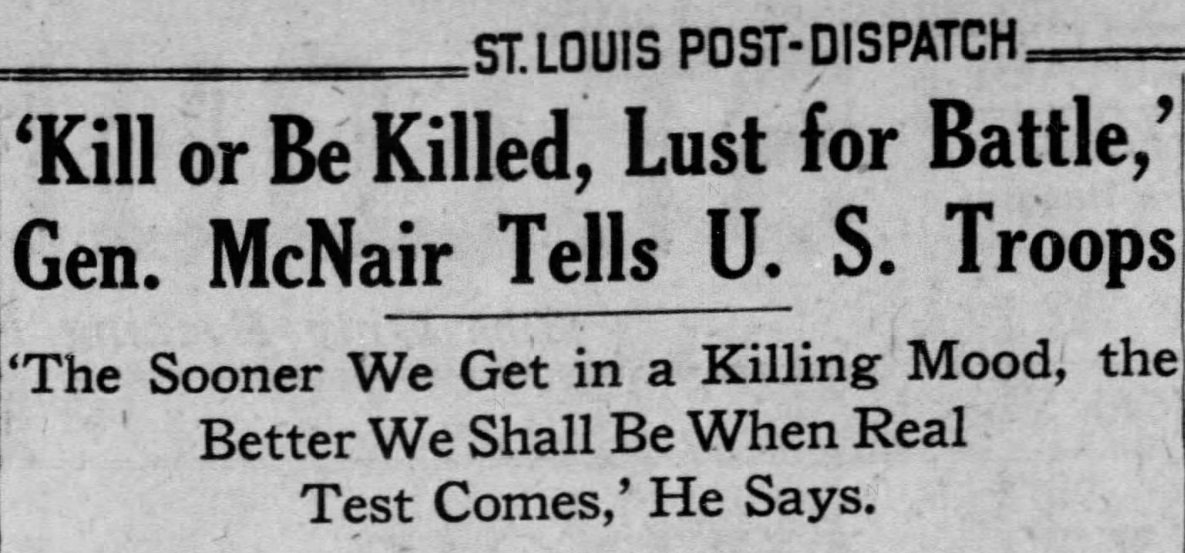
Headline of news report on McNair's 11 November 1942 radio speech. Similar stories appeared in newspapers nationwide from mid to late November.

Because of the difficulty in attracting to the AGF those trainees deemed to be "high-quality", McNair attempted to recruit through improved public relations. One part of this effort was the creation of an office attached to the AGF staff, the Special Information Section (SIS). Approximately 12 officers and enlisted soldiers with experience as writers and editors worked in the SIS to promote improved public appreciation for AGF soldiers, especially the infantry. In addition, the SIS worked with civilian writers and editors, musicians, cartoonists, film makers, and artists who worked in other mediums to enhance the prominence of infantrymen in their work. As part of this initiative, McNair wrote personally to several leading magazine and newspaper publishers to ask for their aid.

In another effort to inform the public of the Army's personnel needs and improve the way the AGF was perceived, on Armistice Day in November 1942, McNair delivered a radio address over the Blue Network. In his remarks, titled "The Struggle is for Survival", McNair described the fighting capability and ruthless attitude of soldiers in the Japanese and German armies, and stated that only similar qualities in American ground troops – by implication, meaning not "the more genteel forms of warfare" practiced by the AAF and ASF – would see the Allies through to victory. The public response to McNair's remarks was largely favorable, though he did receive some criticism for extreme language that seemed to suggest an unfeeling attitude towards death and destruction. More importantly, McNair's radio address did little to improve recruiting into the Army Ground Forces; the public may have developed a better appreciation for infantry, armor, and artillery, but volunteers and draftees continued to be attracted to the AAF and ASF, and the AAF and ASF continued to lobby for the bulk of new service members in the high quality category to be assigned to them.

===== African-American soldiers =====
During World War II, War Department regulations for African Americans required that they be admitted into the Army in numbers proportionate to their share of the population. In addition, the Army was required to establish segregated African American units in each major branch of the service, and give qualified African Americans the opportunity to earn officer commissions. The AGF worked to reconcile these requirements with its mission of producing trained soldiers and units that were capable of meeting and defeating the enemy in battle. To that end, the AGF activated and trained African American units in all major branches of the ground forces, and black soldiers who graduated from officer candidate schools (OCS) were assigned to African American units as they received their commissions. At the peak of the Army's expansion in June 1943, there were nearly 170,000 African Americans training at AGF facilities, or about 10.5 percent of its personnel strength. These figures were in line with the War Department requirements; at the time, African Americans accounted for between 10 and 11 percent of the U.S. population.

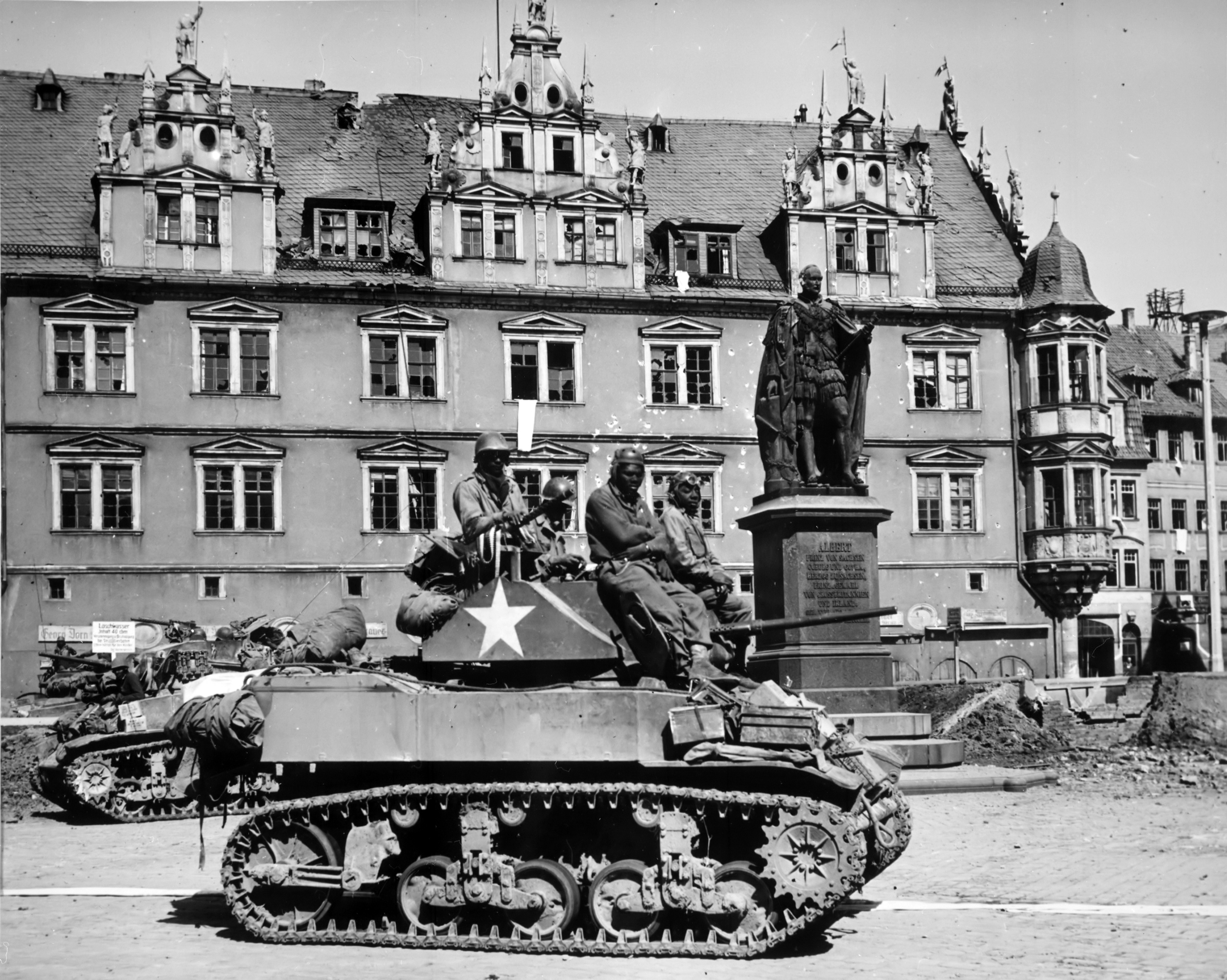
Tank and crew of the 761st Tank Battalion, an African American armor unit organized and trained by the AGF

Beginning with a small number of African American units in the Regular Army and National Guard, the AGF organized and trained many more, including the African-American 92nd and 93rd Infantry Divisions, and the 2nd Cavalry Division. By 1943, the AGF had created nearly 300 African American units, including the 452nd Anti-Aircraft Artillery Battalion, the 555th Parachute Infantry Battalion, and the 761st Tank Battalion.

The War Department General Staff initially suggested incorporating African Americans into units with white soldiers at a ratio of 1 black to 10.6 whites. Based on difficulties with completing training, in large part because the abilities of the recruits were lagging as a result of having grown up in the segregated education system and culture then prevalent in the United States, McNair advocated for separate battalions of African American soldiers, arguing that they could be more effectively employed in this manner. In McNair's construct, such units could be deployed for functions including guarding lines of communication in rear areas and near front lines, or maintained as a reserve by division and corps commanders and committed where they were most needed during combat. The proposal that was adopted was closer to what McNair had advocated, and the AGF lengthened the initial training period. African American officers generally filled company grade positions as they completed OCS, with white officers holding the field grade and senior command positions. In cases where there were not enough African Americans, white officers filled the company grade positions as well.

==== Anti-tank weapons and doctrine ====
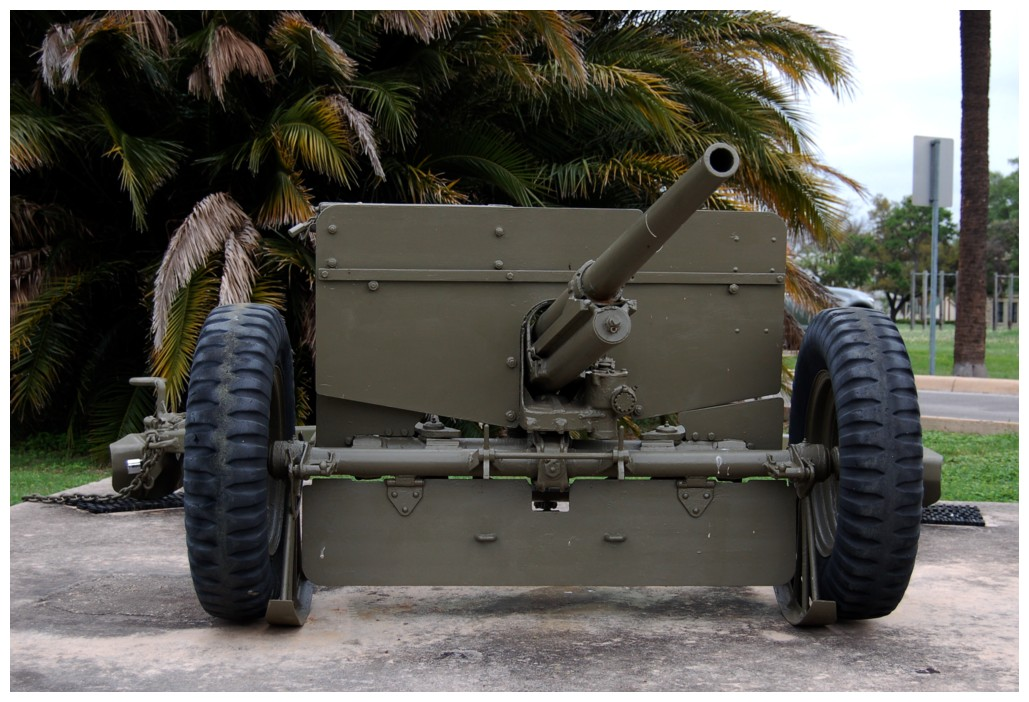
M3 towed anti-tank gun, the Army's primary anti-armor weapon of the late 1930s and early 1940s

Developing and employing anti-tank weapons and creating suitable doctrine proved to be an ongoing challenge, for which some historians have faulted McNair. Marshall favored creation of self-propelled anti-tank weapons; McNair had long favored towed weapons, including the M3 gun. McNair recognized the limitations of the anti-tank weapons then available, and favored a defensive approach for their use, advocating that units emplace and camouflage them, but official doctrine called for a more offensive mindset. It also called for anti-tank units to conduct independent operations; McNair favored a combined arms approach. He believed the use of anti-tank weapons was an economical and efficient means to defeat enemy tanks, and would free up U.S. tanks for wider offensive operations.

When the M3 anti-tank gun proved to be a less than optimum anti-tank weapon, the Army began development of tank destroyers – self-propelled tracked vehicles with a gun capable of engaging a tank, but which were faster and more maneuverable because they had thinner armor than a tank. When it appeared that the Infantry and Cavalry branch chiefs might subsume proposed tank destroyer units into their own task organizations, Marshall attempted to continue progress on tank destroyer development without generating active dissent by approving creation of the Tank Destroyer Center at Camp Hood. In practice, the separate Tank Destroyer Center meant that commanders of armor and infantry units had little or no experience with anti-tank weapons, or the most effective way to employ them.

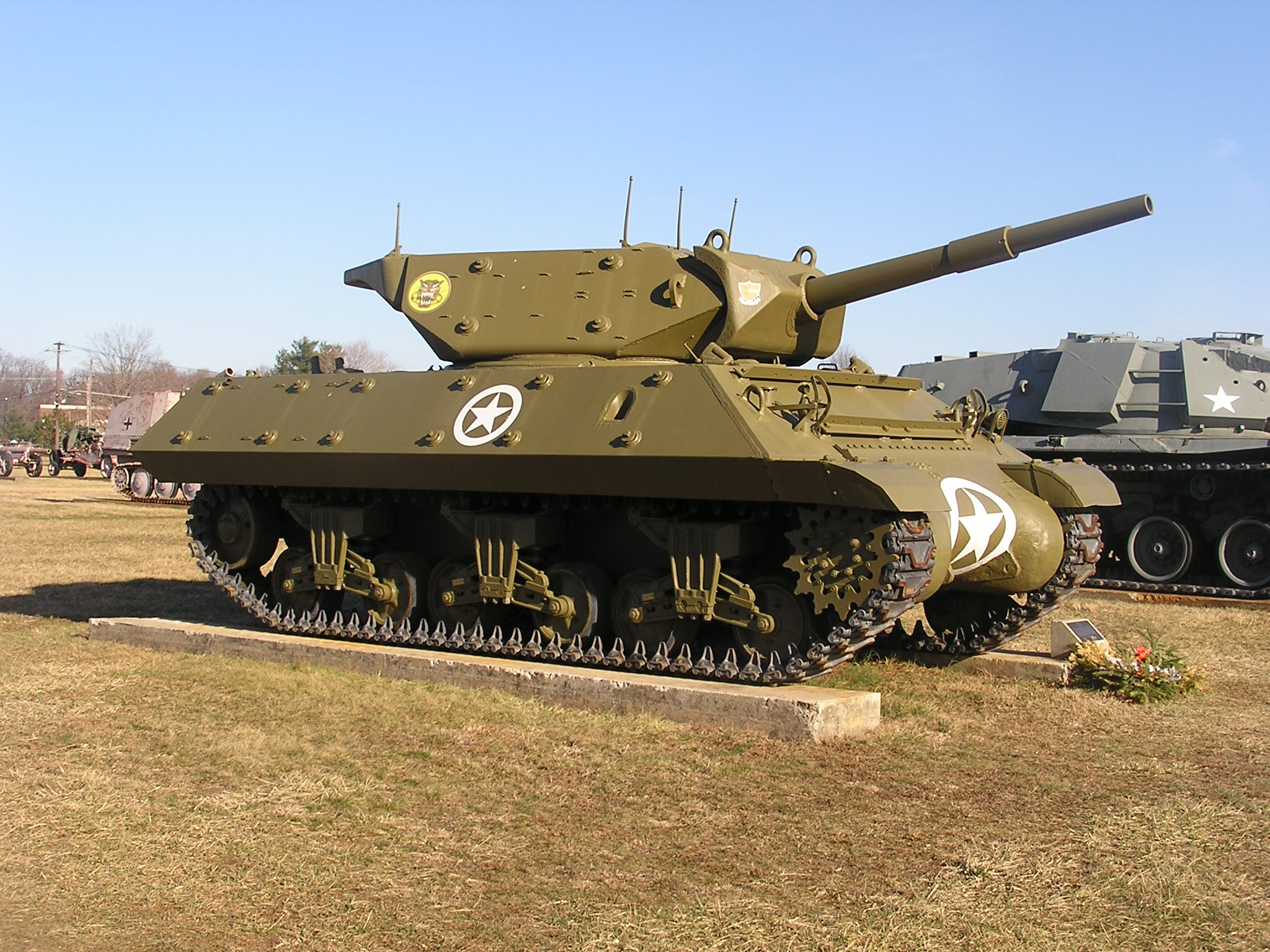
M10 Tank Destroyer, anti-armor weapon fielded by the U.S. Army in World War II

After having initially fielded the anti-tank weapon it had available – the M3 towed gun – the Army began to field self-propelled anti-tank weapons, first the M3 Gun Motor Carriage, and then the M10 tank destroyer. As a result of the Army's inability to resolve the questions of equipment and doctrine, it continued to struggle with efforts to develop viable anti-tank doctrine, and efforts to employ anti-tank guns or tank destroyers as part of combined arms team often proved ineffective.

The ongoing debate within the Army about which type of anti-tank or tank destroyer weapon to use, and what design specifications ought to be included, also hampered the AGF's abilities to field the weapons and provide adequate training. As a result, during their initial employment and use, AGF observers in combat theaters identified several issues, including some as basic as training ammunition for the M3 Gun Motor Carriage being used unknowingly during combat, which obviously limited its effectiveness. Over time, commanders in combat resorted to field expedient measures to solve the problems, including learning to employ anti-tank guns and later tank destroyers in mutually supporting positions, and integrating them with infantry and armor units to maximize their effectiveness as part of a combined arms effort. The AGF in turn incorporated these lessons learned into mobilization training, so that over time soldiers and units deploying for combat were making use of the most up to date doctrine and tactics.

==== Tanks ====
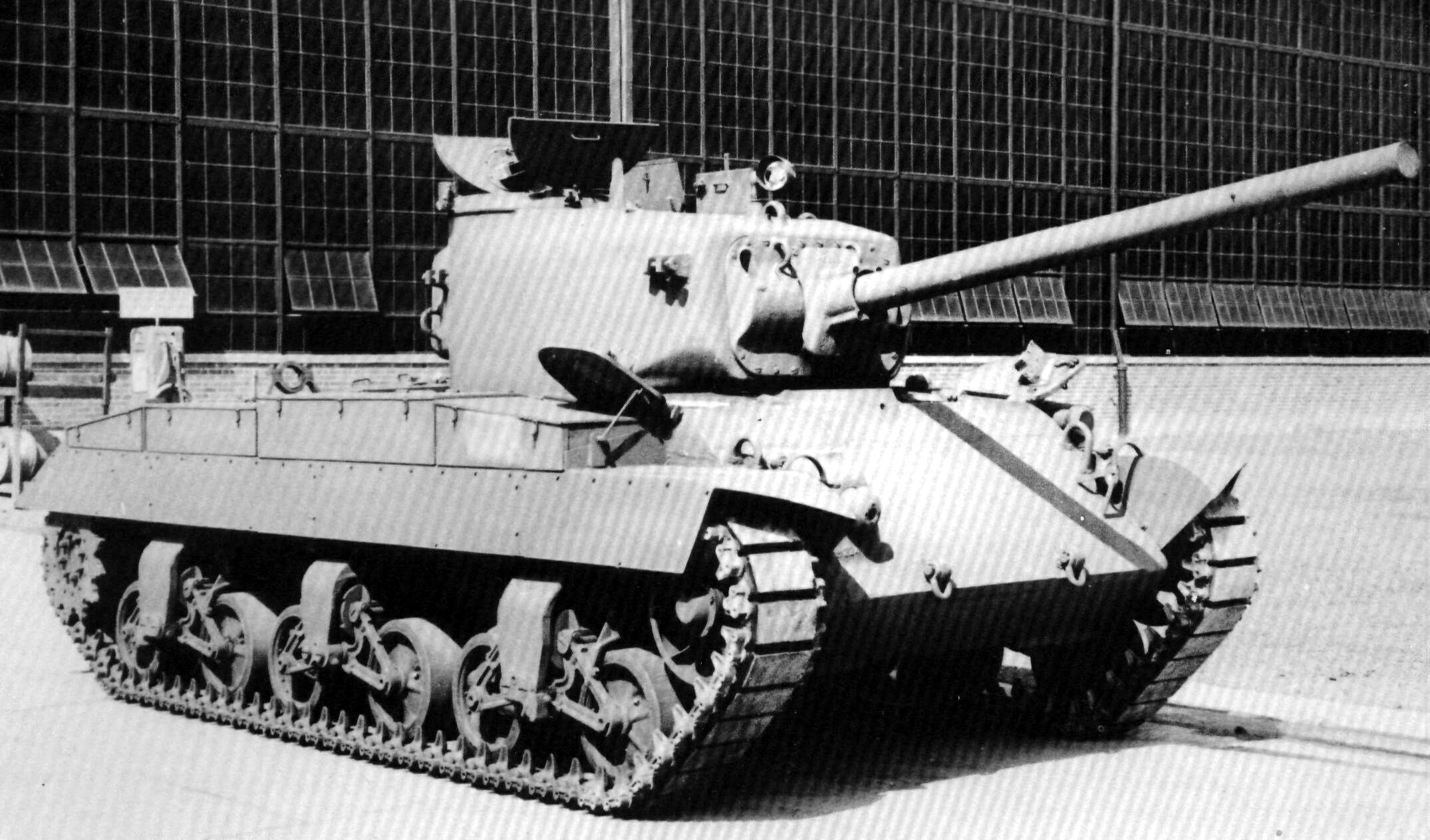
T20 Medium Tank. McNair opposed fielding the T20 in part over concerns that its weight and space requirements would delay the transport to Europe of other needed equipment due to limited cargo ship availability.

At the start of World War II, the United States fielded the M3 Lee and M4 Sherman as its primary medium tanks. After-action reports from the North African Campaign and other engagements convinced commanders including Jacob L. Devers that the U.S. needed to deploy a heavier tank with more firepower in order to counter German Tiger I and Panther tanks. During his assignment as Chief of Armor earlier in the war, Devers had rejected the M6 heavy tank for being under-powered and under-gunned for its weight and size. As a result, the Army's Ordnance Department had overseen the creation of the T20 Medium Tank. In 1942, Devers advocated the immediate shipment of 250 T20s to the European Theater. McNair opposed this request, still convinced that smaller but heavily armed self-propelled tank destroyers could be employed faster and more effectively, especially when considering factors such as available space on cargo ships transporting weapons and equipment to Europe. The Army attempted development of an improved version of the T20, the T23, but design flaws kept it from being moved into production.

In December 1943, Devers and other commanders with tank experience succeeded in convincing George Marshall of the need for a tank with more armor and firepower than the M3 and M4. An improved prototype, the T26, was produced as the M26 Pershing, and the Army ordered 250 Pershings. McNair was opposed, stating that the M4 was adequate, and arguing that tank-on-tank battles requiring the U.S. to employ heavier tanks with bigger guns were unlikely to occur. The Pershings were fielded, but arrived in Europe too late to have an effect on the conduct of the war.

McNair's views on the employment of tanks also factored into reorganizations of the Army's armored divisions. The Armored Force had been created in 1940, and grew to include 16 divisions, though McNair unsuccessfully recommended reducing the number to six. The Armored Force created an armored corps headquarters in 1942, but it was deactivated at McNair's instigation after only a few months. In addition to arguing against the need for an armored corps, McNair believed the task organization for an armored division to be too large and unwieldy, again presuming that tanks would primarily serve as an exploitation force for rapid advances and as infantry support, but were not likely to engage in tank-on-tank battles. As a result, he played a key role in downsizing the armored divisions in 1942 and 1943, with the 1943 reorganization reducing the divisions by 4,000 soldiers and between 130 and 140 tanks. The downsizing enabled the creation of separate tank battalions, which could be deployed to support infantry divisions on an as-needed basis. (The downsizing did not affect the 2nd or 3rd Armored Divisions, which maintained their "heavy" task organization.)

== Death and burial ==
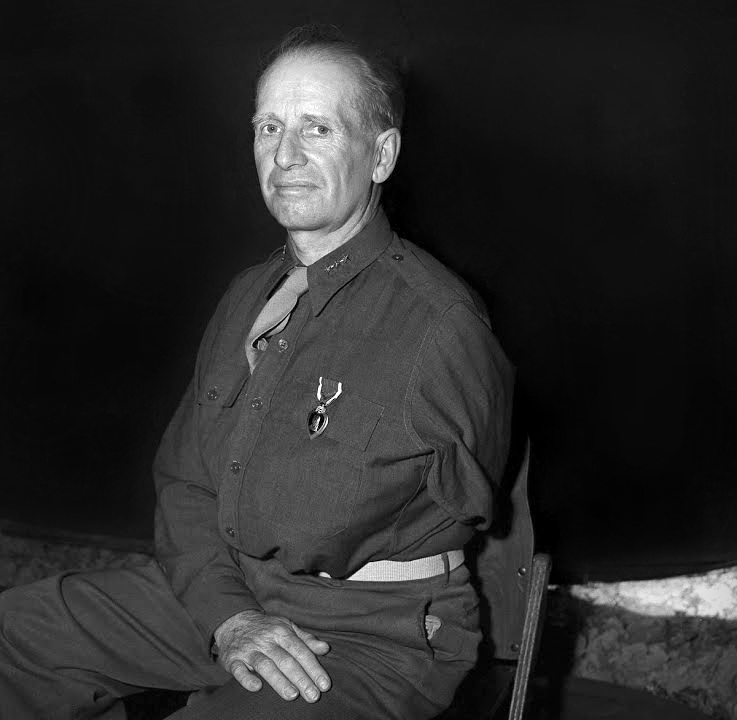
McNair after being awarded the Purple Heart in Tunisia in April 1943, with his left arm in sling inside his shirt

In 1943, McNair traveled to North Africa on an inspection tour of AGF troops to acquire firsthand information about the effectiveness of training and doctrine, with the goal of making improvements in AGF's mobilization and training process. On 23 April, he was observing front line troops in action in Tunisia when he sustained fragmentation wounds to his arm and head; a company first sergeant standing nearby was killed.

McNair deployed to the European Theater in 1944; his assignment was initially undetermined, and Marshall and Dwight Eisenhower, the supreme commander in Europe, considered him for command of the Fifteenth United States Army or the fictitious First United States Army Group (FUSAG). With Lieutenant General George S. Patton, the FUSAG commander, slated to take command of the actual Third United States Army after the invasion, the Army required another commander with a recognizable name and sufficient prestige to continue the Operation Quicksilver deception that masked the actual landing sites for Operation Overlord, the Invasion of Normandy. Eisenhower requested McNair as Patton's FUSAG successor, and Marshall approved.

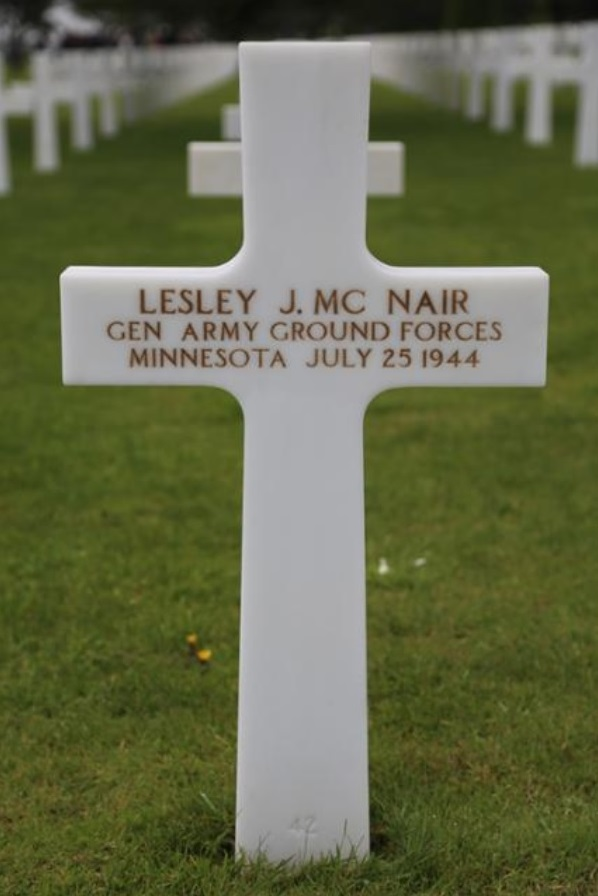
Lesley J. McNair grave marker, updated to reflect posthumous promotion, dedicated 11 November 2010

In July 1944, McNair was in France to observe troops in action during Operation Cobra, and add to the FUSAG deception by making the Germans believe he was in France to exercise command. He was killed near Saint-Lô on 25 July when errant bombs of the Eighth Air Force fell on the positions of 2nd Battalion, 120th Infantry, where McNair was observing the fighting. In one of the first Allied efforts to use heavy bombers in support of ground combat troops, several planes dropped their bombs short of their targets. Over 100 U.S. soldiers were killed, and nearly 500 wounded.

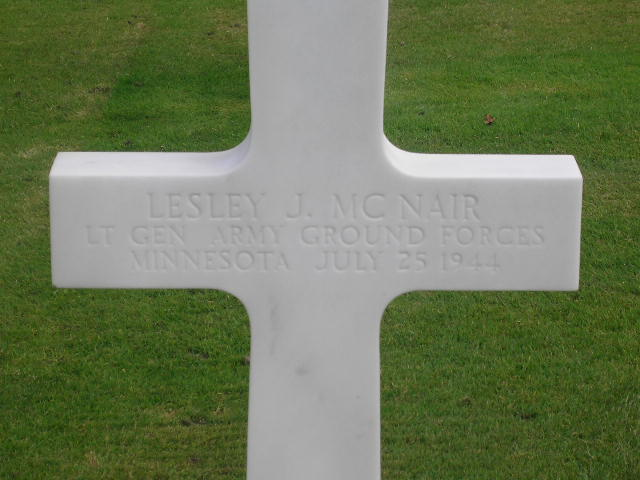
Grave marker, prior to 2010

McNair was buried at the Normandy American Cemetery and Memorial in Normandy, France; his funeral was kept secret to maintain the FUSAG deception, and was attended only by his aide and generals Omar Bradley, George S. Patton, Courtney Hodges, and Elwood Quesada. When the press reported his death, initial accounts indicated enemy fire had killed him; not until August did the news media report the actual circumstances. McNair is the highest-ranking military officer buried at the Normandy cemetery. Along with Frank Maxwell Andrews, Simon Bolivar Buckner Jr., and Millard Harmon, he was one of four American lieutenant generals who died in World War II. McNair's tombstone originally indicated his rank of lieutenant general. In 1954, Buckner and he were posthumously promoted to general by an act of Congress. The American Battle Monuments Commission (ABMC) did not upgrade McNair's gravestone; upon being informed in 2010 that the original marker was still in place, the ABMC replaced McNair's headstone with one that indicates the higher rank.

== Hearing loss ==
While generally in excellent physical condition even as he aged, McNair began to experience hearing loss early in his career. The condition progressed, and included tinnitus, but did not interfere with his work; physical examinations indicated he had no trouble with tasks including speaking on the telephone. By the time he reached the ranks of the Army's senior commanders, his hearing loss was severe enough that he compensated by reading lips, and by forgoing participation in events where his difficulty in hearing would pose an obstacle, such as large conferences. By the late 1930s, he worried that his hearing condition might result in his mandatory retirement for medical reasons. Instead, Marshall issued a waiver which allowed him to continue to serve. His hearing loss may have prevented him from obtaining a field command during World War II, but Marshall was unwilling to do without his abilities as an organizer and trainer.

== Legacy ==
=== Reputation ===
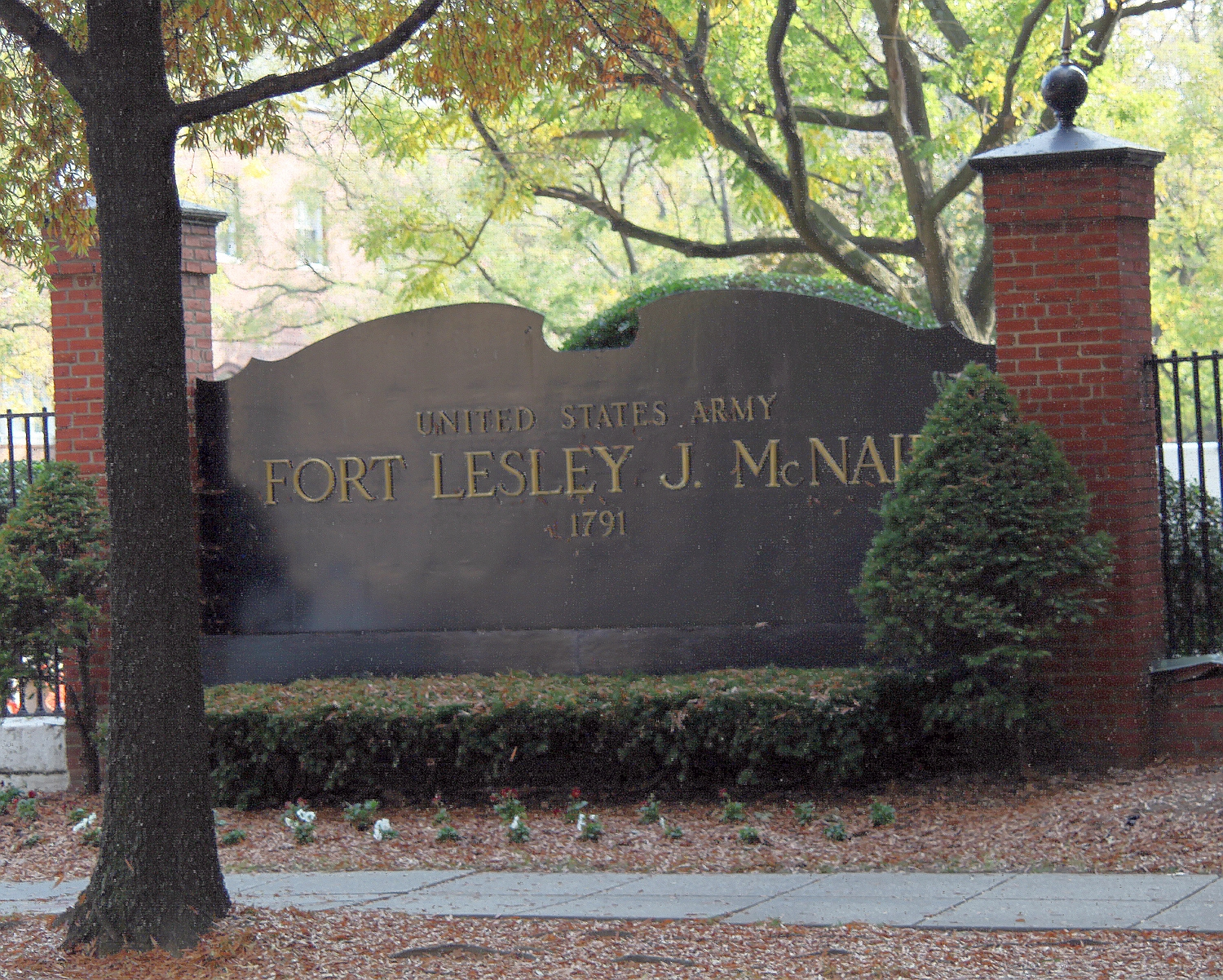
Sign near main gate to Fort McNair, the former Washington Barracks

McNair was held in high regard by his contemporaries, as evidenced by performance appraisals that routinely gave him the highest possible ratings. Marshall also held McNair in high esteem, as demonstrated by the fact that McNair was a top stateside commander during World War II, was considered for a top command in Europe, and was ultimately selected to command the First United States Army Group as part of a deception plan that required a general with a good reputation and high name recognition for successful execution. In addition, soon after McNair was assigned to serve as commandant of the Command and General Staff School, Marshall learned that he would become the Chief of Staff of the Army. In a letter to McNair, Marshall wrote: "You at the head of Leavenworth are one of the great satisfactions I have at the moment in visualizing the responsibilities of the next couple of years." Mark W. Clark served under McNair as operations officer (G-3) at AGF Headquarters before ascending to the general officer ranks. In his autobiography, Clark referred to McNair as "one of the most brilliant, selfless and devoted soldiers" he had ever encountered.

McNair's primary legacy was his role as "the brains of the Army", in that his involvement in unit design (the triangular division), education (the Command and General Staff Officer Course), doctrine (updating the Field Service Manual and revising field artillery methods and procedures), weapons design and procurement (experimentation with field artillery, anti-tank weapons, and anti-aircraft weapons), and training of soldiers and units (as commander of Army Ground Forces), especially in the era between World Wars I and II, made him one of the primary architects of the Army as the United States employed it for World War II.

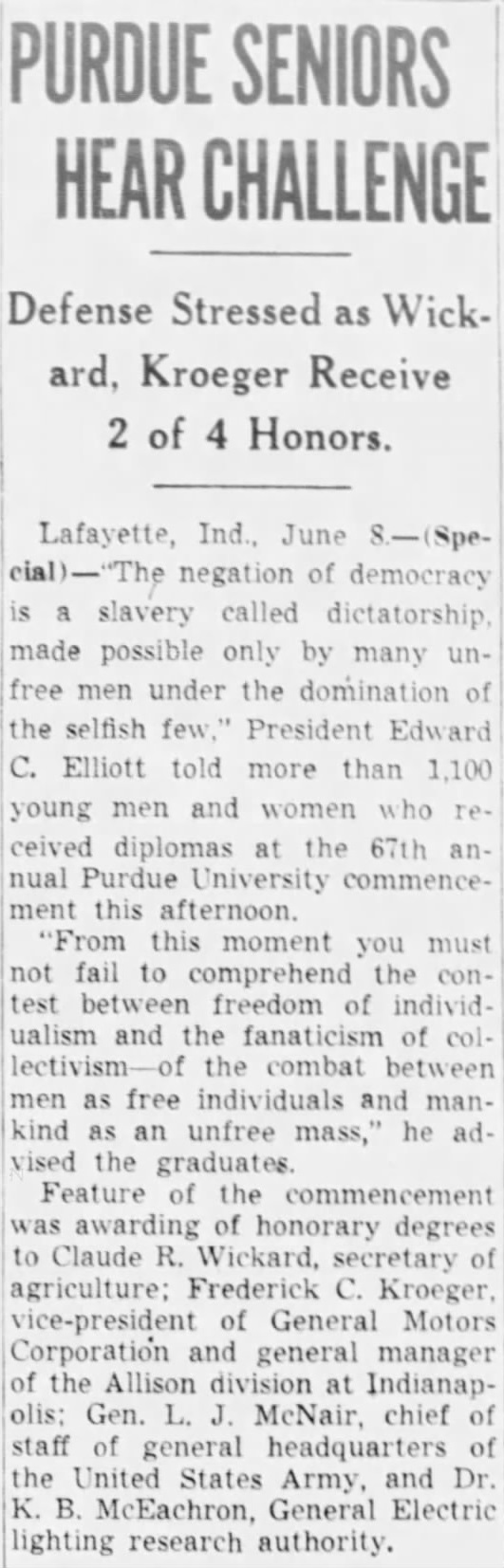
News story on Purdue's 1941 graduation, including McNair's LL.D.

Another enduring McNair legacy was his training method of beginning with basic soldier skills and then building through successive echelons until large units became proficient during exercises and war games that closely simulated combat. These concepts remain the Army's core principles for planning, executing, and overseeing individual and collective training.

=== Historical debate ===
McNair's decisions and actions during World War II continue to be debated by historians, particularly the individual replacement system and the difficulties with resolving the issue of tanks versus anti-tank guns and tank destroyers.

With respect to the individual replacement program, historian Stephen Ambrose described it as inefficient, wasteful, and a contributor to unnecessary casualties. However, some recent assessments have viewed it more favorably. As one example, a 2013 essay by Robert S. Rush concluded "Success results NOT from rotating organizations in and out of combat but from sustaining those organizations while in combat."

On the questions of fielding anti-tank guns and tank destroyers as the primary anti-armor weapons, and fielding light and medium tanks instead of a heavy tank capable of matching those in German armor units, historians including Mark Calhoun argue that McNair recognized the limitations of the anti-tank weapons then available, and the difficulties with providing better ones given time and production constraints, and so worked to develop a doctrine that made the best possible use of the weapons that were available. Other historians, including Steve Zaloga, argue that McNair's opposition to development and fielding of heavy tanks represented a "World War I mindset" that hindered the overall performance of the US Army during World War II.

=== Awards and honors ===
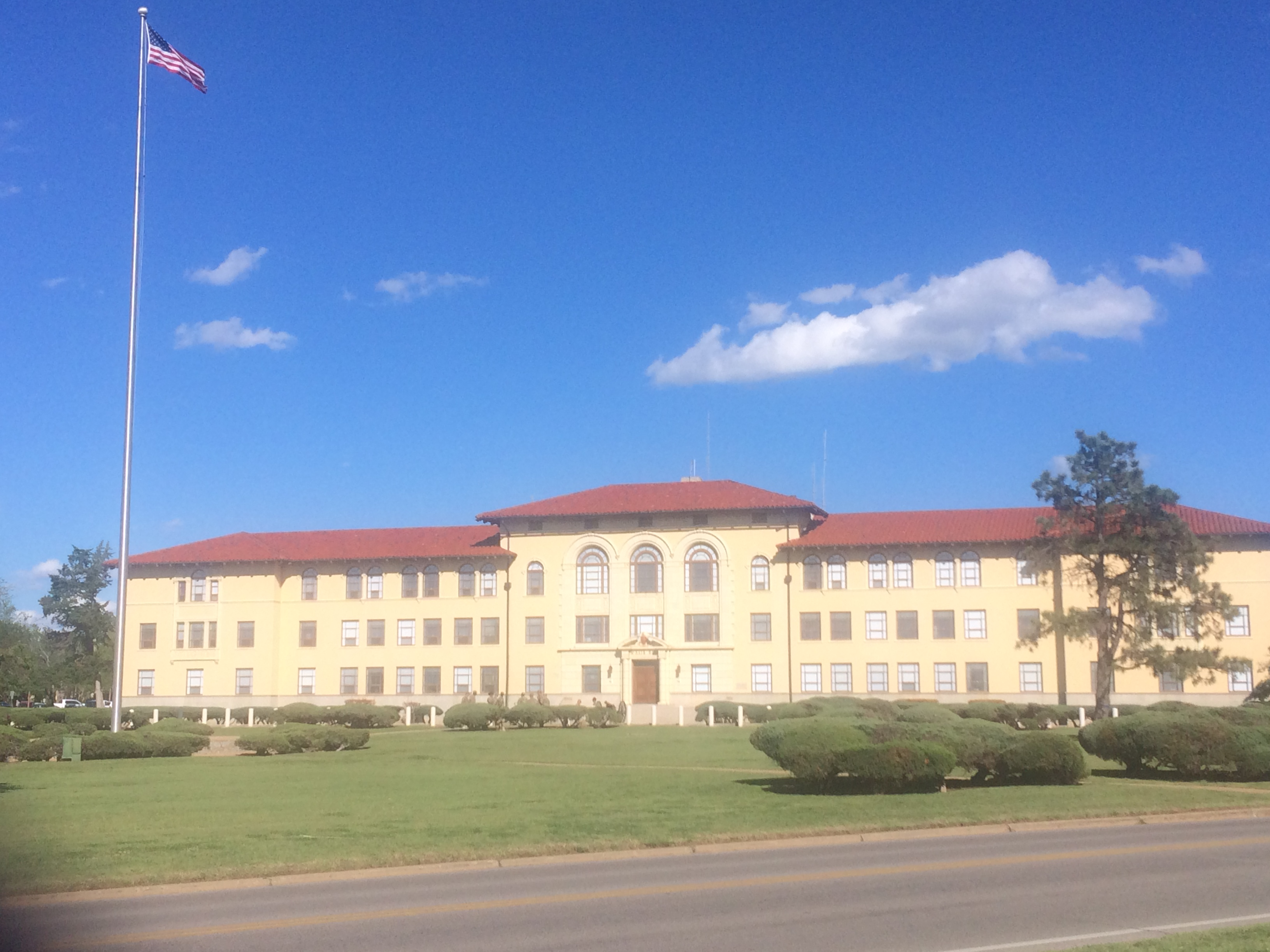
McNair Hall, Fort Sill, Oklahoma

McNair received the honorary degree of LL.D. from Purdue University in 1941 and the University of Maine in 1943. The Lesley J. McNair Bridge was a temporary structure over the Rhine River in Cologne, Germany; it stood from 1945 until it was dismantled after the erection of a permanent bridge in 1946. Washington Barracks in Washington, D.C., was renamed Fort Lesley J. McNair in 1948. Roads and buildings on several U.S. Army posts carry the name "McNair", including McNair Avenue and McNair Hall (Fort Sill), McNair Road (Joint Base Myer–Henderson Hall), McNair Drive (Fort Monroe), and McNair Hall (Fort Leavenworth). McNair Gate at Schofield Barracks, Hawaii and McNair Barracks in Berlin, Germany, were named for McNair. The Berlin facility was closed as a U.S. military installation in 1994, and has since been redeveloped, but retains a museum which details its use as a U.S. base. McNair Kaserne in Höchst, Germany, was also named in his honor. Home to several Army Signal Corps units, it was closed and turned over to the German government in 1992, and has since been redeveloped as residential and commercial space. Veterans of Foreign Wars Post 5263 in Lawton, Oklahoma (near the Fort Sill Artillery Center and School) is named for him.

McNair was inducted into the Fort Leavenworth Hall of Fame, which was created in 1969 and is managed by the United States Army Combined Arms Center. The Fort Leavenworth Hall of Fame honors soldiers who were stationed at Fort Leavenworth, and significantly contributed to the Army's history, heritage, and traditions. In 2005, McNair was inducted into the U.S. Army's Force Development Hall of Fame.

There is a collection of McNair papers at the National Archives and Records Administration. Purdue University maintains another folder of papers related to McNair's service there.

== Family ==
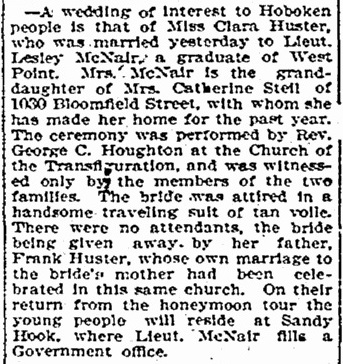
Newspaper announcement of Huster–McNair wedding. Mrs. McNair was born "Clara" but was usually called Clare.

McNair married Clare Huster (1882–1973) of New York City on 15 June 1905. They were the parents of a son, Douglas (1907–1944).

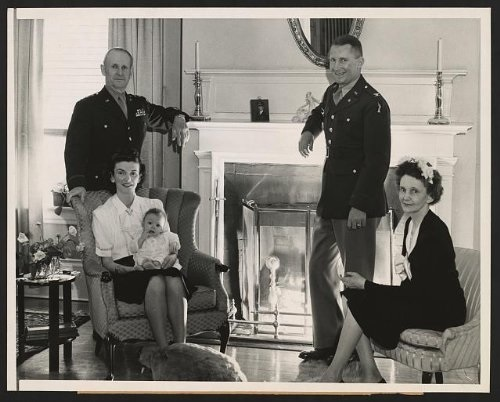
McNair and family in 1943. Douglas stands at right. Seated (left) are Douglas's wife Freda and daughter Bonnie Clare. Seated (right) is Clare McNair.

=== Clare McNair ===
After McNair's death, Clare McNair was employed by the United States Department of State to investigate working conditions for female members of the United States Foreign Service Auxiliary, the organization created to augment the Foreign Service during World War II. She traveled to several foreign locations, including North Africa, Europe, and Latin America to interview employees and observe working conditions in order to make recommendations for improvements.

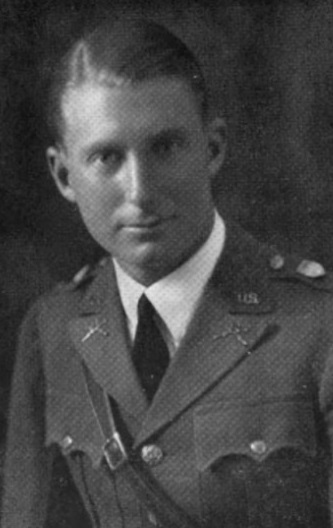
Colonel Douglas C. McNair

=== Douglas C. McNair ===
Douglas Crevier McNair was born in Boston, Massachusetts, on 17 April 1907, while his father was stationed at the Watertown Arsenal. He was a 1928 graduate of West Point, and became an artillery officer after initially qualifying in the infantry branch. The younger McNair advanced through command and staff positions to become chief of staff of the 77th Infantry Division with the rank of colonel. He was killed in action on the island of Guam on 6 August 1944, only 12 days after the death of his father. He died when two other 77th Division soldiers and he became involved in a skirmish with Japanese soldiers while scouting locations for a new division command post. Douglas McNair posthumously received the Silver Star, Legion of Merit, and Purple Heart. First interred on Guam, in 1949 he was buried at the National Memorial Cemetery of the Pacific in Hawaii. The 77th Division named its temporary encampment near Agat, Guam, "Camp McNair" in his honor. Another Camp McNair, this one near Fujiyoshida, Japan, served as a U.S. military training facility from the late 1940s until the 1970s, and was used extensively during the Korean War. In addition, the McNair Village housing development at Fort Hood, Texas, was also named for him.

== Military awards ==
Lesley McNair's awards and decorations included:

Army Distinguished Service Medal (with two oak leaf clusters)
Purple Heart (with one oak leaf cluster)
Mexican Border Service Medal
World War I Victory Medal
American Defense Service Medal
American Campaign Medal
European–African–Middle Eastern Campaign Medal with Arrowhead Device and 2 bronze service stars
World War II Victory Medal
Officer of the Legion of Honor (France)

Note: Two Distinguished Service Medals, one Purple Heart, and the World War II Victory Medal were awarded posthumously.

== Dates of rank ==
Insignia	Rank	Component	Date
No insignia	Cadet	United States Military Academy	1 August 1900
No insignia in 1904	Second lieutenant	Regular Army	15 June 1904
	First lieutenant	Regular Army (Temporary)	1 July 1905
	First lieutenant	Regular Army	25 January 1907
	Captain	Regular Army (Temporary)	20 May 1907
	First lieutenant	Regular Army	1 July 1909
	Captain	Regular Army	9 April 1914
	Major	Regular Army	15 May 1917
	Lieutenant colonel	National Army (Temporary)	5 August 1917
	Colonel	National Army (Temporary)	26 June 1918
	Brigadier general	National Army (Temporary)	1 October 1918
	Major	Regular Army	16 July 1919
	Lieutenant colonel	Regular Army	9 January 1928
	Colonel	Regular Army	1 May 1935
	Brigadier general	Regular Army	1 January 1937
	Major general	Army of the United States (Temporary)	25 September 1940
	Major general	Regular Army (Permanent)	1 December 1940
	Lieutenant general	Army of the United States (Temporary)	9 June 1941
	General	Regular Army (Posthumous)	19 July 1954

== Works by McNair ==
(Partial list)

- "The Single Observation Range Finder". The Field Artillery Journal. Washington, DC: United States Field Artillery Association. April–June 1915. pp. 275–295 – via Google Books.
- McGlachlin, Edward F.; McNair, Lesley J. (October–December 1915). "Adjustment of Height of Burst by Variation of Sight". The Field Artillery Journal. Washington, D.C.: United States Field Artillery Association. pp. 674–695 – via Google Books.
- "Artillery In Rear Guard Action— Map Problem". Tactical Principles and Decisions: Volume I. Ft. Leavenworth, Kansas: General Services Schools Press. 1920. pp. 312–320 – via Google Books.
- "Raids". Tactical Principles and Decisions: Volume II. Ft. Leavenworth, Kansas: General Services Schools Press. 1920. pp. 855–872 – via Google Books.
- Courses in Tactical Principles and Decisions: Lecture – Raids. Ft. Leavenworth, Kansas: U.S. Army School of the Line. 19 February 1920 – via HathiTrust.
- "Military Training at Educational Institutions". Purdue Engineering Review. Lafayette, Indiana: Purdue University. January 1925. pp. 6–7, 18 – via Google Books.
- "The R.O.T.C." (PDF). The Coast Artillery Journal. Fortress Monroe, Virginia: U.S. Army Coast Artillery School. February 1928. pp. 172–175.
- "And Now The Autogiro" (PDF). The Field Artillery Journal. Washington, DC: United States Field Artillery Association. January–February 1937. pp. 5–17. Archived (PDF) from the original on 27 August 2018.
- "Radio Address: The Struggle is for Survival; The Importance of Training and Personnel". ibiblio.org. Chapel Hill, North Carolina: University of North Carolina. 11 November 1942.

== Sources ==
=== Books ===
- Adams, John A. (2015). General Jacob Devers: World War II's Forgotten Four Star. Bloomington, Indiana: Indiana University Press. ISBN 978-0-253-01517-4.
- Air Force Judge Advocate General's School (1990). The Air Force Law Review. Washington, DC: United States Air Force.
- American Battle Monuments Commission. Normandy Cemetery and Memorial (PDF). Washington, DC: ABMC. Archived from the original (PDF) on 3 March 2016.
- Axelrod, Alan (2007). Encyclopedia of World War II. Vol. 1. New York: Facts on File, Inc. ISBN 978-0-8160-6022-1.
- Busch, Briton Cooper (2006). Bunker Hill to Bastogne: Elite Forces and American Society. Washington, DC: Potomac Books, Inc. ISBN 978-1-57488-775-4.
- Calkin, Homer L. (1978). Women in the Department of State: Their Role in American Foreign Affairs (PDF). Washington, DC: United States Department of State.
- Cameron, Robert Stewart (2008). Mobility, Shock, and Firepower: The Emergence of the U.S. Army's Armor Branch, 1917–1945. Washington, DC: Center of Military History, U.S. Army. ISBN 9780160872419.
- Carafano, James Jay (2000). After D-Day: Operation Cobra and the Normandy Breakout. Mechanicsburg, Pennsylvania: Stackpole Books. ISBN 978-0-8117-3487-5.
- Carafano, James Jay (2007). GI Ingenuity: Improvisation, Technology, and Winning World War II. Mechanicsburg, Pennsylvania: Stackpole Books. ISBN 9781461751076.
- Cullum, George Washington; Holden, Edward Singleton (1920). Biographical Register of the Officers and Graduates of the United States Military Academy. Vol. 6, Part 1. Saginaw, Michigan: Seeman & Peters.
- Curator, Fort Sam Houston Museum (1990). Camp Bullis: A History of the Leon Springs Military Reservation, 1890–1990. Camp Bullis, Texas: Fort Sam Houston Museum.
- Davis, Henry Blaine Jr. (1998). Generals in Khaki. Raleigh, North Carolina: Pentland Press. ISBN 978-1-57197-088-6.
- Ent, Uzal W. (1996). Fighting on the Brink: Defense of the Pusan Perimeter. Paducah, Kentucky: Turner Publishing Company. ISBN 978-1-56311-209-6.
- Field Artillery Board, U.S. Army (1910). Report of the Field Artillery Board on a Test of the Efficiency of Modern Field Works When Attacked by the Latest Types of Field Cannon Designed for the United States Artillery. Washington Barracks, Washington, DC: Engineer School, U.S. Army.
- Gabel, Christopher R. (1985). Seek, Strike and Destroy: US Army Tank Destroyer Doctrine in World War II. Ft. Leavenworth, Kansas: Combat Studies Institute, U.S. Army Command and General Staff College. ISBN 9781428915770.
- Gore, James Howard (1922). American Legionnaires of France. Washington, DC: W. F. Roberts Co.
- Green, Constance McLaughlin; Thomson, Harry C.; Roots, Peter C. (1990). The Ordnance Department: Planning Munitions for War (PDF). Washington, DC: Center of Military History, United States Army. Archived from the original (PDF) on 4 March 2016.
- Greenfeld, Kent Roberts; Palmer, Robert R.; Wiley, Bell I. (1987). United States Army in World War II: The Army Ground Forces; The Organization of Ground Combat Troops (PDF). Washington, DC: Center of Military History, U.S. Army. Archived from the original (PDF) on 24 September 2015.
- Haskew, Michael E. (2015). Tank: 100 Years of the World's Most Important Armored Military Vehicle. Walker, Michigan: Zenith Press. ISBN 978-0-7603-4963-2.
- History Division, Headquarters III Corps and Fort Hood (25 January 1991). FH PAM 870-1: Fort Hood Memorializations (PDF). Fort Hood, Texas: Headquarters III Corps and Fort Hood. Archived from the original (PDF) on 6 March 2013.
- Kennedy, David M. (2007). The Library of Congress World War II Companion. New York: Simon & Schuster. ISBN 978-0-7432-5219-5.
- Matloff, Maurice (1990). Command Decisions: The 90 Division Gamble. CMH pub.; 70-7-15. Washington, DC: Center of Military History, U.S. Army.
- McNair, James Birtley (1955). McNair, McNear, and McNeir Genealogies: 1955 Supplement. Los Angeles, California: Westernlore Press.
- Muir, Malcolm Jr. (2001). The Human Tradition in the World War II Era. Wilmington, DE: SR Books. ISBN 978-0-8420-2785-4.
- Mushaben, Joyce Marie (2008). The Changing Faces of Citizenship: Integration and Mobilization Among Ethnic Minorities in Germany. New York: Berghahn Books. ISBN 978-1-84545-468-5.
- Onofrio, Jan (2000). Kansas Biographical Dictionary. St. Clair Shores, Michigan: Somerset Publishers, Inc. ISBN 978-0-403-09313-7.
- Nineteen Hundred and Four Howitzer Board (1904). The Howitzer. West Point, NY: United States Military Academy.
- Palmer, Robert R.; Wiley, Bell I.; Keast, William R. (1991). United States Army in World War II: Army Ground Forces; The Procurement and Training of Ground Combat Troops (PDF). Washington, DC: Center of Military History, U.S. Army. Archived from the original (PDF) on 25 March 2016.
- Palmer, Robert R. (1945). Army Ground Forces Study No. 8: Reorganization of Ground Troops for Combat. Washington, DC: Historical Section – Army Ground Forces. Archived from the original on 1 May 2017.
- Powell, William S. (1991). Dictionary of North Carolina Biography. Vol. 4, L–O. Chapel Hill, North Carolina: University of North Carolina Press. ISBN 978-0-8078-1918-0.
- Patton, George S.; Harkins, Paul D. (1975) [1947]. War as I Knew it. Boston: Houghton Mifflin Company. ISBN 978-0-395-73529-9.
- Price, Frank James (1974). Troy H. Middleton: A Biography. Baton Rouge, LA: Louisiana State University Press. ISBN 978-0-8071-2467-3.
- Russell, Henry (2014). The Purge of the Thirtieth Division. Annapolis: Naval Institute Press. ISBN 978-0-8702-1074-7.
- Tucker, Spencer C. (2016). World War II: The Definitive Encyclopedia and Document Collection. Vol. I. Santa Barbara: ABC-CLIO. ISBN 978-1-4408-4593-2.
- Seventy-Seventh Division Association (1947). Ours to Hold it High: The History of the 77th Infantry Division in World War II. Washington, DC: Infantry Journal Press.
- Wiley, Bell I. (1946). The Training of Negro Troops: Army Ground Forces Study No. 36 (PDF). Washington, DC: Center of Military History, United States Army.
- Yeide, Harry (2010). The Infantry's Armor: The U.S. Army's Separate Tank Battalions in World War II. Mechanicsburg, Pennsylvania: Stackpole Books. ISBN 978-0-8117-0595-0.
- Zabecki, David T. (1999). World War II in Europe: An Encyclopedia. New York: Garland Publishing, Inc. ISBN 978-0-8240-7029-8.
- Zaloga, Steve (2008). Armored Thunderbolt: The U.S. Army Sherman in World War II. Mechanicsburg, Pennsylvania: Stackpole Books. ISBN 978-0-8117-0424-3.
- Zaloga, Steve (2015). Armored Champion: The Top Tanks of World War II. Mechanicsburg, Pennsylvania: Stackpole Books. ISBN 978-0-8117-1437-2.

=== Internet ===
- Calhoun, Mark T. (2012). "General Lesley J. McNair: Little-Known Architect of the U.S. Army" (PDF). kuscholarworks.ku.edu. Lawrence, Kansas: University of Kansas.
- "Minnesota Death Index, 1908–2002, entry for Nora M. Jessup". Ancestry.com. Provo, Utah: Ancestry.com, LLC.
- "California Death Index, 1940–1997, entry for Irene Naftalin". Ancestry.com. Provo, Utah: Ancestry.com, LLC.
- "Memorial, Douglas C. McNair". apps.westpointaog.org. West Point Association of Graduates.
- "National Memorial Cemetery of the Pacific". interment.net. Clear Digital Media.
- "Burial record, Clare H. McNair". Arlington National Cemetery. Washington, DC: U.S. Department of the Army. Archived from the original on 22 July 2011.
- "Information Page, VFW Post 5263". VFW: Posts; Oklahoma; Post 5263. Kansas City, Missouri: Veterans of Foreign Wars. Archived from the original on 11 November 2017.
- "Fort Lesley J. McNair History" (PDF). Military District of Washington. Washington, DC: U.S. Army. Archived from the original (PDF) on 1 December 2016.
- "McNair Kaserne". mcnairkaserne.org. Doug Otoupal. Archived from the original on 10 May 2017.
- "Awards, Lesley James McNair". Hall of Valor. Springfield, Virginia: Military Times.
- Thayer, Bill. "Transcription of Entries in Biographical Register of the Officers and Graduates of the United States Military Academy at West Point". penelope.uchicago.edu. Bill Thayer.
- Calhoun, Mark T. (2015). "Product page, General Lesley J. McNair: Unsung Architect of the U. S. Army". kansaspress.ku.edu. Lawrence, KS: University Press of Kansas. Archived from the original on 28 August 2017.
- "Force Development Hall of Fame". www.fa50.army.mil/. Washington, DC: U.S. Army. Archived from the original on 21 July 2007.
- Combined Arms Center. "Fort Leavenworth Hall of Fame". usacac.army.mil/. Fort Leavenworth, Kansas: United States Army. Archived from the original on 19 July 2015.
- "Lesley J. McNair papers, 1928". Purdue University Libraries, Archives and Special Collections. West Lafayette, IN: Purdue University.
- "McNair, Lesley James, 1883–1944: Person Authority Record". catalog.archives.gov. College Park, MD: National Archives and Records Administration.
- Carey, Brian Todd (29 October 2015). "The Tragic Death of General Lesley J. McNair During Operation Cobra". Warfare History Network. McLean, Virginia: Sovereign Media. Archived from the original on 24 March 2017.
- "Lt.Gen. Lesley McNair Bridge". Dig It. Cologne, Germany: Westdeutscher Rundfunk. Archived from the original on 26 November 2017.
- "Contact Us". Fort Sill, Oklahoma. Ft. Sill, OK: U.S. Army Fires Center of Excellence. Archived from the original on 27 February 2017.
- "Home Page: TRADOC Analysis Center". www.trac.army.mil/. Ft. Leavenworth, Kansas: U.S. Army Training and Doctrine Command. Archived from the original on 24 March 2017.
- Ricks, Thomas E. (27 November 2013). "A few words in favor of the much-derided individual replacement system for soldiers". Voices: Thomas E. Ricks. Washington, DC: Foreign Policy magazine.
- Sibert Family (1980). "Memorial page: Franklin C. Sibert 1912". apps.westpointaog.org. West Point, New York: West Point Association of Graduates. Archived from the original on 18 March 2017.
- Vento, Carol Schultz (21 April 2012). "The U.S. World War II Troop Replacement Policy". Defense Media Network. Tampa, Florida: Faircount Media Group.
- "McNair Barracks". Berlin Brigade.

=== Magazines ===
- Aultman, Dwight E. (April–June 1916). "Field Artillery Directory: Regular Army" (PDF). Field Artillery Journal. Washington, DC: United States Field Artillery Association. Archived (PDF) from the original on 11 February 2017.
- Lamb, Christopher J. (1 January 2017). "Leadership and Operational Art in World War II: The Case for General Lesley J. McNair". Joint Force Quarterly. Washington, DC: National Defense University.
- Zdon, Al (1 February 2015). "Minnesota American Legion Military Hall of Fame: Lesley J. McNair" (PDF). The Legionnaire. Saint Paul, Minnesota: Minnesota American Legion and Auxiliary. Archived from the original (PDF) on 21 March 2017.

=== Newspapers ===
- "Town Notes: Walter B. Congdon and Lesley McNair". Bemidji Pioneer. Bemidji, Minnesota. 31 May 1900.
- "Houlton and Woolnough: They Are Recommended for Cadetships". Saint Paul Globe. Saint Paul, Minnesota. 17 July 1900.
- Church, William Conant, ed. (11 November 1911). "Recent Patents". Army and Navy Register. Washington, DC – via Google Books.
- "Lafayette and Purdue Will Observe Peace Anniversary". Journal & Courier. Lafayette, Indiana. 7 November 1924.
- McEvoy, William J. (18 December 1925). "Five Year Suspension for Billy Mitchell". Lebanon Daily News. Lebanon, Pennsylvania. United Press.
- "Erickson Resigns as Draft Director: Accepts Colonelcy in U.S. Army". North Adams Transcript. North Adams, MA. 17 June 1942.
- "Billy Mitchell's Resignation was Accepted Today". Lebanon Daily News. Lebanon, Pennsylvania. United Press. 29 January 1926.
- "Gen. McNair Killed in Action". Dixon Evening Telegraph. Dixon, Illinois. Associated Press. 27 July 1944.
- "McNair Unable to Visit Sisters On Trip Here Last Year". Minneapolis Star Tribune. Minneapolis. 28 July 1944.
- "George L. Eubanks Now On Rhine". Mexia Weekly Herald. Mexia, Texas. 6 July 1945.
- "Postwar Duties for Stackpole". The Evening News. Harrisburg, Pennsylvania. 21 July 1945.
- "Col. Abendroth Pledges His Best to D.C. Guard". The Sunday Star. Washington, DC. 17 July 1949.
- "High Ranking Fighting Men Lost in Two Wars". Chicago Tribune. Chicago. 24 December 1950.
- "Death notice, Murray M. McNair". Minneapolis Star Tribune. Minneapolis. 8 August 1976.
- McVeigh, Alex (12 June 2008). "2,000 Troops Run for Army Birthday". www.army.mil/. Washington, DC: U.S. Army.
- Guthrie, Monica K. (23 July 2015). "Fort Sill welcomes its new chief of staff". Fort Sill Cannoneer. Ft. Sill, Oklahoma.
- Sprock, Phyllis (6 June 2011). "Street names on Fort Monroe reveal post's past". The Peninsula Warrior. Norfolk, Virginia.
- Dougherty, Devon (29 May 2016). "General McNair: Verndale man made the U.S. a superpower". Wadena Pioneer Journal. Wadena, Minnesota.
- "Author Highlights WW II Vet/South Grad". Tiger News. Minneapolis: South High School. 23 March 2017. Archived from the original on 31 August 2017.

Military offices
Preceded by Charles M. Bundel	Commandant of the United States Army Command and General Staff School; 1939–1940	Succeeded by Edmund L. Gruber
New title	Commanding General Army Ground Forces; 1942–1944	Succeeded by Ben Lear
Preceded by George S. Patton	Commanding General First United States Army Group (fictitious); 1944	Succeeded by William Hood Simpson
