= Kialegee Tribal Town =

Native American tribe in Oklahoma

Kilice (Creek)

Regions with significant populations
- United States (Oklahoma)

Languages
- English, Muscogee Creek

Religion
- Protestantism (Indian Baptist), traditional tribal religion

Related ethnic groups
- other Muscogee (Creek) peoples: Alabama, Coushatta, Miccosukee, Muscogee (Creek) Nation, and Seminole

The Kialegee Tribal Town (Creek: Kilice) is a federally recognized Native American tribe in Oklahoma, as well as a tribal town within the Muscogee Creek Confederacy in the American Southeast. Tribal members pride themselves on retaining their traditions and many still speak the Muscogee language. The name "Kialegee" comes from the Muscogee word, eka-lache, meaning "head left."

== Government ==
The Kialegee Tribal Town is headquartered in Wetumka, Oklahoma. Of the 700 enrolled tribal citizen, 629 live within the state of Oklahoma. Its tribal jurisdictional area falls in Creek County, Muskogee County, Tulsa County, County, Okmulgee County, Hughes, McIntosh, Okfuskee counties.

The tribe's Mekko or Chief is elected for a term of two years.

As of 2025, the current administration is:

- Mekko (Chief): Stephanie Yahola

== Enrollment ==
The tribe's enrollment rules require individuals to be a full-blood Native American: half to full-blood Muscogee Creek and up to one-half Indian of any other tribe. Documentation for enrollment follows matrilineal descent, as this was their traditional kinship system. Children were considered born to the mother's family and clan, and property or hereditary roles passed through her people. Today, any descendant of a female Kialegee tribal citizen is automatically eligible for tribal citizenship. Spouses of Kialegee tribal citizens may petition for citizenship. In special circumstances, any full-blood Indian may petition the tribe for enrollment as an "Adopted Member." For tribal citizens who are Muscogee by blood, ancestry is traced from the Town roll, regardless of whether the individual has ancestors on the Dawes Rolls or not.

The Kialegee Tribal Town operates its own tribal courts. It has an environmental educational program for youth, the Kialegee Tribal Town's Environmental "Kub" Program.

== Culture ==
Town members and visitors celebrate the annual Kialegee Nettv (Day), a gathering that celebrates the town's history and culture.

== History ==
Kialegee emerged as an independent town from a larger Creek town, Tuckabatche, located along rivers in what is now Alabama. Kialegee in return produced two daughter towns, Hutchechuppa and Achinahutchee. Before removal, the Muscogee Confederacy included about 50 towns. As with the remainder of the Creek people, the Kialegee had a matrilineal kinship system, with descent figured through the mother's line. Children are considered to be born into the mother's clan and receive their status from her and her people. It was an agrarian community. Women and children grew and processed a variety of crops, in addition to gathering roots, berries and nuts, while men hunted for game or harvested fish.

On June 29, 1796 leaders from Kialegee signed a peace treaty with the new United States. But, within a decade the townspeople joined the Red Stick Upper Creeks in the Creek Civil War, in which traditionalists (Red Sticks) fought against the Lower Towns, which tended to have members who were more assimilated to European-American culture, as they had far more interaction with them. In 1813, US troops burned Kialegee. In 1814, 1818, 1825, and 1826, Kialegee representatives signed treaties with the United States ceding some of their lands. Finally, 166 families of Kialegee were forced to relocate to Indian Territory in 1835 after Congress passed the Indian Removal Act.

The tribe settled south of what would become Henryetta, Oklahoma. They maintained a ceremonial ground and played stick ball against Alabama-Quassarte Tribal Town. By 1912, their ground had been put to sleep, as ethnologist John R. Swanton noted when he visited the town. He recorded that Kialegee was a Red Town, or community of warriors.

After the passage of the Oklahoma Indian Welfare Act in 1936, which provided for revival of self-government among the Native American tribes, the US federal government offered each of the Muscogee Creek tribal towns the opportunity to enroll as an individual tribe and establish their own government. Of more than 40 towns, only three accepted: Kialegee, Thlopthlocco, and the Alabama-Quassarte.

The tribe ratified its constitution and by-laws on June 12, 1941. The tribe is governed by a mekko or town king. Additional officers are the First Warrior, Second Warrior, Secretary, and Treasurer. The first tribal headquarters was the home of Martin Givens.

== Tribal flag ==
The flag of the tribe contains a sky blue circle, featuring a pair of stickball sticks, used in the traditional game still played at ceremonial grounds today. The black cross at the top represents the Christian religion. To the left is a hollowed log and beater, which women used to grind cornmeal, central to Muscogee cuisine. At the bottom is a ceremonial lodge with a rounded bark roof, built on an earthwork mound. This lodge was the center of the tribal town for religious and civic gatherings and also a shelter for the needy. The earthwork mound refers to the Mississippian culture heritage of modern Muscogee people and the complex mounds that still exist of that culture. The bald eagle at the right is a sacred animal, featured in many tribal stories.

== Economic development ==
The Kialegee Etvlwv Business Committee operates a daycare, gas station, and smoke shop. Kialegee Tribal Town also operates its own housing division. In 2008, its annual tribal economic impact was $1,017,684.

In 2011 Kialegee Tribal Town was preparing land for development of a Red Clay Casino in Broken Arrow, Oklahoma. The National Indian Gaming Commission was reviewing the project closely, as local residents and businesses strongly opposed it. The Red Clay Casino plan was halted by a legal injunction in 2012, and despite subsequent progress by the Kialegee in court, was not continued.

In 2017 controversy arose regarding proposed Kialegee development of a different tract of land in Broken Arrow, owned by Steve Bruner (Creek), for an Embers Grille restaurant and possible Red Creek Casino. The Muscogee (Creek) Nation Attorney General warned Bruner about legal consequences for illegal gaming at the site, saying the tribe did not control that land and so lacked authority for gaming there. An attorney for the Kialegee said Muscogee Nation interference with the project would be resisted. On August 16, 2017, the site was raided by Muscogee Lighthorse police prior to the facility's opening, and they seized gambling equipment, which they alleged was illegal.
