= Alabama–Quassarte Tribal Town =

American Indian tribe in Oklahoma, United States

Oola Albaama-Kosaati (Alabama) Oola Albaamo-Kowassaati (Koasati)
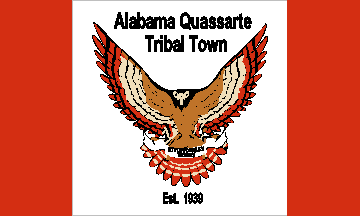
- The flag of the Alabama-Quassarte Tribal Town

Total population
- 350+

Regions with significant populations
- United States (Oklahoma)

Languages
- English, Mvskoke, Alabama language, Koasati language

Religion
- Protestantism, traditional tribal religion

Related ethnic groups
- Muskogean peoples: Miccosukee, Chickasaw, Choctaw, Creek, and Seminole

The Alabama–Quassarte Tribal Town (Alabama: Oola Albaama-Kosaati, Koasati: Oola Albaamo-Kowassaati) is both a federally recognized Native American tribe and a tribal town of two Muskogean-speaking peoples: the Alabama and Coushatta (also known as Quassarte). Their traditional languages include Alabama, Koasati, and Mvskoke. As of 2014, the tribe includes 369 enrolled citizens, who live within the state of Oklahoma as well as Texas, Louisiana, and Arizona.

Other federally recognized Coushatta tribes are the Coushatta Tribe of Louisiana and the Alabama–Coushatta Tribe of Texas. Two other Muscogee tribal towns are federally recognized, and 40 tribal towns, or talwa, remain enrolled in the Muscogee Creek Nation. They are headquartered in Wetumka, Oklahoma.

== History ==
The Quassarte and Alabama were originally two distinct tribes, who both lived on the banks of the Alabama River from Mobile, Alabama to the upper reaches of the river. Both the river and the state are named after the Alabama. The Quassarte are also known as the Coushatta or Koasati, in their own language.

The two tribes shared many similarities in their language and culture, as they were both Muskogean-speaking. In the early 17th century, after a conflict with French settlers, the tribes formed an alliance. They intermarried freely and became active trading partners. In 1763, the two tribes joined the Muscogee Nation Confederacy (also called the Creek Confederacy).

Before removal of the Muscogee people from Alabama in the 1830s, the Muscogee Nation Confederacy included more than 44 different tribal towns. The Alabama and Quassarte peoples made up six to eight of those towns. Facing increasing encroachment by European-American settlers, some of the Quassarte and Alabama peoples moved into Louisiana and Texas in the late 18th century and early 19th century. These emigrants and their descendants formed what are today the federally recognized Coushatta Tribe of Louisiana and the Alabama–Coushatta Tribe of Texas.

Those who stayed in Alabama joined forces and became a single town. The Indian Removal Act of 1830 forced the tribal town, along with the rest of the Muscogee, to Indian Territory west of the Mississippi River. They settled in what would become Hughes, McIntosh, Okfuskee, and Seminole counties. The Dawes Allotment Act of 1887 and the Curtis Act of 1898, intended to increase assimilation, provided for allotments of land to individual households from the communal reservation lands and sale of the "surplus"; in addition, it required the extinguishing of tribal governments and courts. The Bureau of Indian Affairs took an increased role on the reservations.

The Alabama–Quassarte Tribal Town maintained its cultural identity. It practiced traditional dances and beliefs at the Alabama Ceremonial Grounds near Wetumka. Other Native American peoples also survived culturally and preserved their religious practices. The town took the opportunity afforded by the federal Indian Reorganization Act of 1934 under the President Franklin D. Roosevelt administration and the Oklahoma Indian Welfare Act of 1936 to set up a government. It organized as a distinct, federally recognized tribe in April 1939. Due to its historic relationship with the Muscogee Creek Nation, which became federally recognized in 1972, tribal citizens can maintain dual citizenship in both tribes.

== Government ==
The Alabama–Quassarte Tribal Town is headquartered in Wetumka, Oklahoma. Its tribal jurisdictional area, as opposed to a reservation, spans Creek, Hughes, Mayes, McIntosh, Muskogee, Okfuskee, Okmulgee, Rogers, Seminole, Tulsa, and Wagoner counties in Oklahoma.

The Alabama–Quassarte Tribal Town is governed by a chief, second chief, secretary, floor speaker, solicitor, chairman of the governing committee, and the governing committee itself, with twelve elected members. Their current administration is:

- Chief: Samuel Marshall Jr.
- Second Chief: Lena Wind

Tribal enrollment is based on lineal descent from 1890 and 1895 tribal rolls. It does not require a minimum blood quantum, but dictates that as long as you can trace your lineage through one or both parents who were citizens of the tribe at the time of your birth, citizenship can be granted to you. Certain federal benefits for qualified Native Americans, such as educational scholarships, do require certain blood quantum.

The tribe maintains a close relationship with the Muscogee Creek Nation and falls under the jurisdiction of their tribal courts. Some citizens are dually enrolled in the Muscogee Nation.

== Economic development ==
The Alabama–Quassarte Tribal Town operates a tribal housing program and a gaming center (Red Hawk Gaming) in Wetumka.
