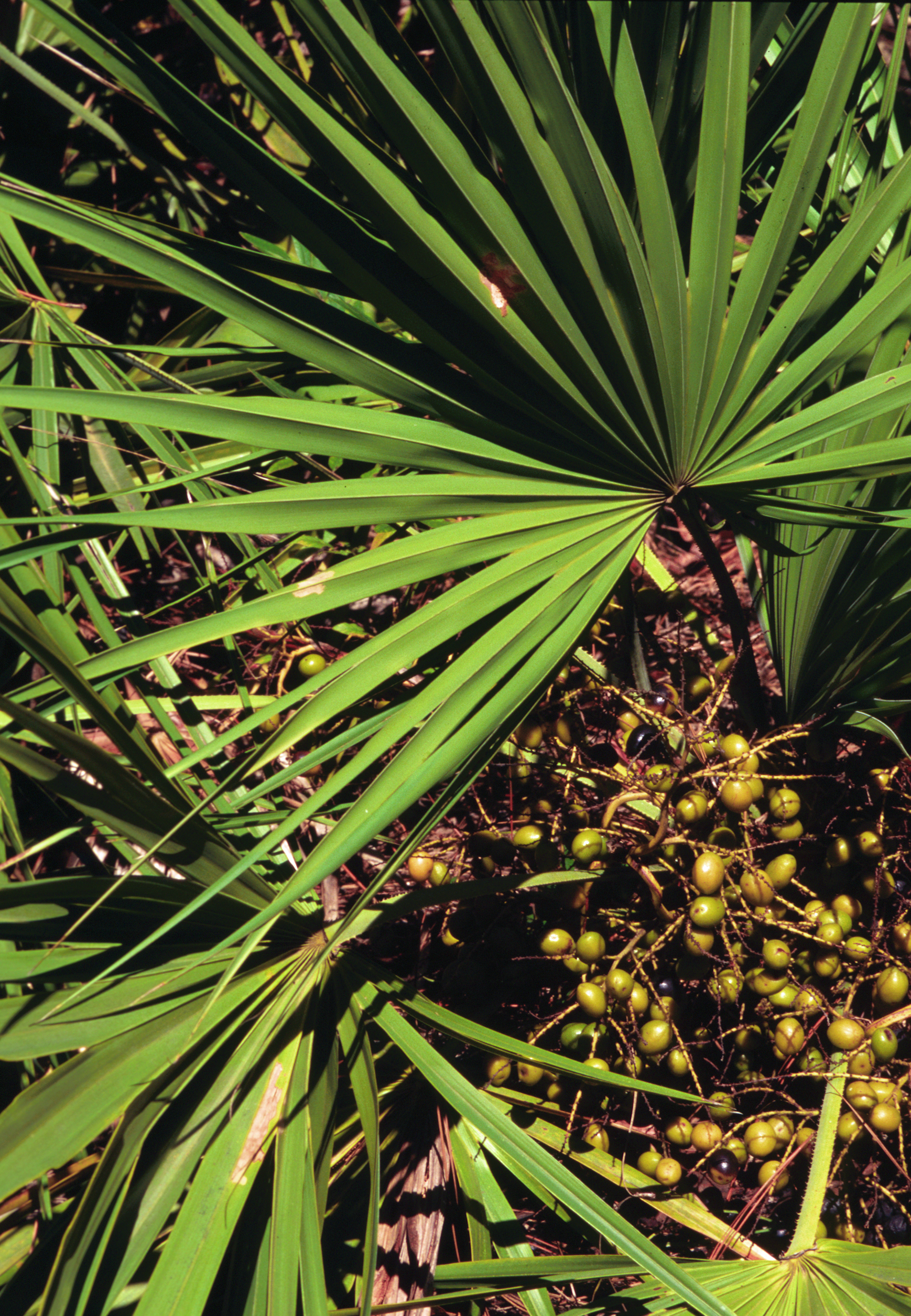

Conservation status
- Apparently Secure (NatureServe)

Scientific classification
- Kingdom: Plantae
- Clade: Tracheophytes
- Clade: Angiosperms
- Clade: Monocots
- Clade: Commelinids
- Order: Arecales
- Family: Arecaceae
- Subfamily: Coryphoideae
- Tribe: Trachycarpeae
- Genus: Serenoa; Hook.f.
- Species: S. repens

Binomial name
- Serenoa repens (Bartram) J.K.Small
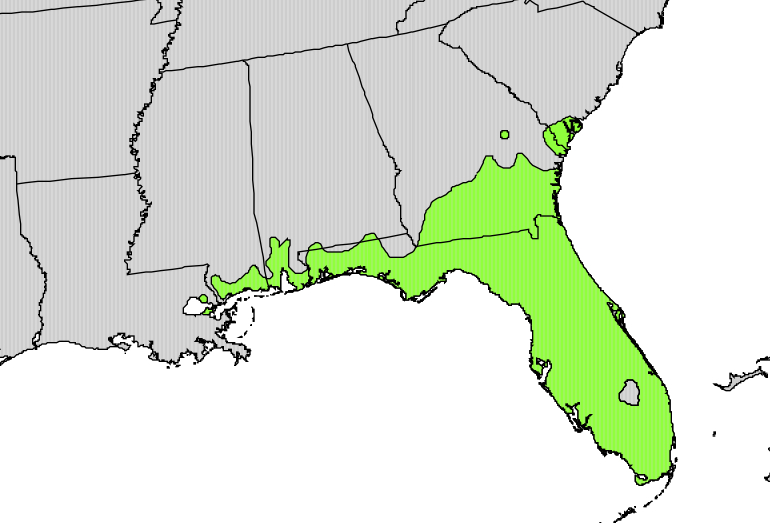
- Natural range

Synonyms
- Synonymy: Corypha repens W.Bartram; Corypha obliqua W.Bartram; Chamaerops serrulata Michx.; Sabal serrulata (Michx.) Schult.f; Sabal serrulatum (Michx.) Schult.f, spelling error; Diglossophyllum serrulatum (Michx.) Schaedtler; Brahea serrulata (Michx.) H.Wendl.; Serenoa serrulata (Michx.) Hook.f. ex B.D.Jacks.; Serenoa repens f. glauca Moldenke

= Serenoa =

Saw palmetto

Species of palm tree

Serenoa repens, commonly known as saw palmetto, is a small palm, growing to a maximum height around 2–3 m (6.6–9.8 ft).

== Taxonomy ==
It is the only species in the monotypic genus Serenoa. The genus name honors American botanist Sereno Watson.

== Distribution and habitat ==
It is endemic to the subtropical and tropical Southeastern United States as well as Mexico, most commonly along the south Atlantic and Gulf Coastal plains and sandhills. It grows in clumps or dense thickets in sandy coastal areas, and as undergrowth in pine woods or hardwood hammocks.

== Description ==
Erect stems or trunks are rarely produced, but are found in some populations. It is a hardy plant; extremely slow-growing, and long-lived, with some plants (especially in Florida) possibly being as old as 500–700 years.

Saw palmetto is a fan palm, with the leaves that have a bare petiole terminating in a rounded fan of about 20 leaflets. The petiole is armed with fine, sharp teeth or spines that give the species its common name. The teeth or spines are easily capable of breaking the skin, and protection should be worn when working around a saw palmetto. The leaves are light green inland, and silvery-white in coastal regions. The leaves are 1–2 m in length, the leaflets 50–100 cm long. They are similar to the leaves of the palmettos of genus Sabal. The flowers are yellowish-white, about 5 mm across, produced in dense compound panicles up to 60 cm long.

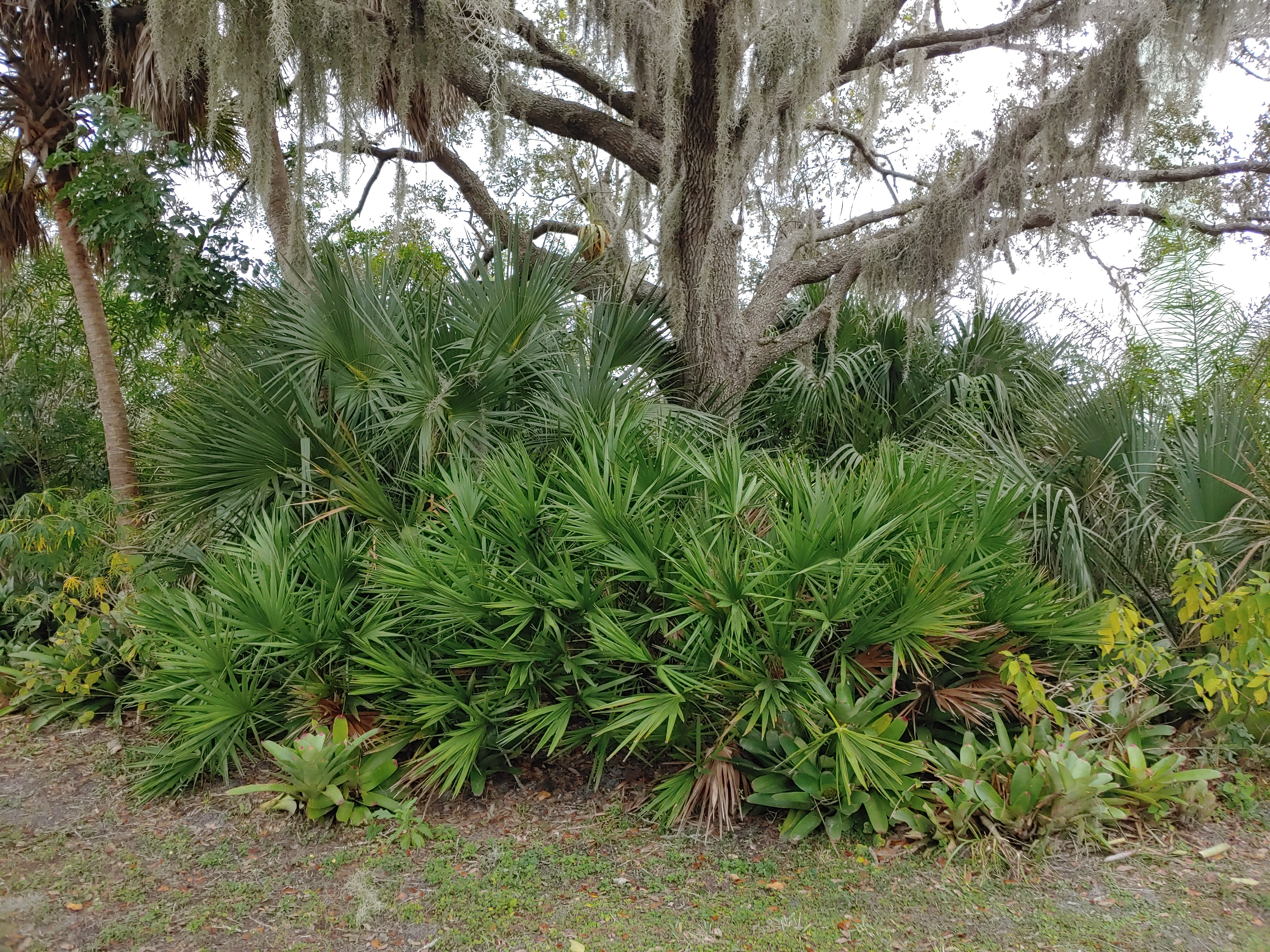
Among live oak and sabal palmetto in habitat, Punta Gorda, Florida

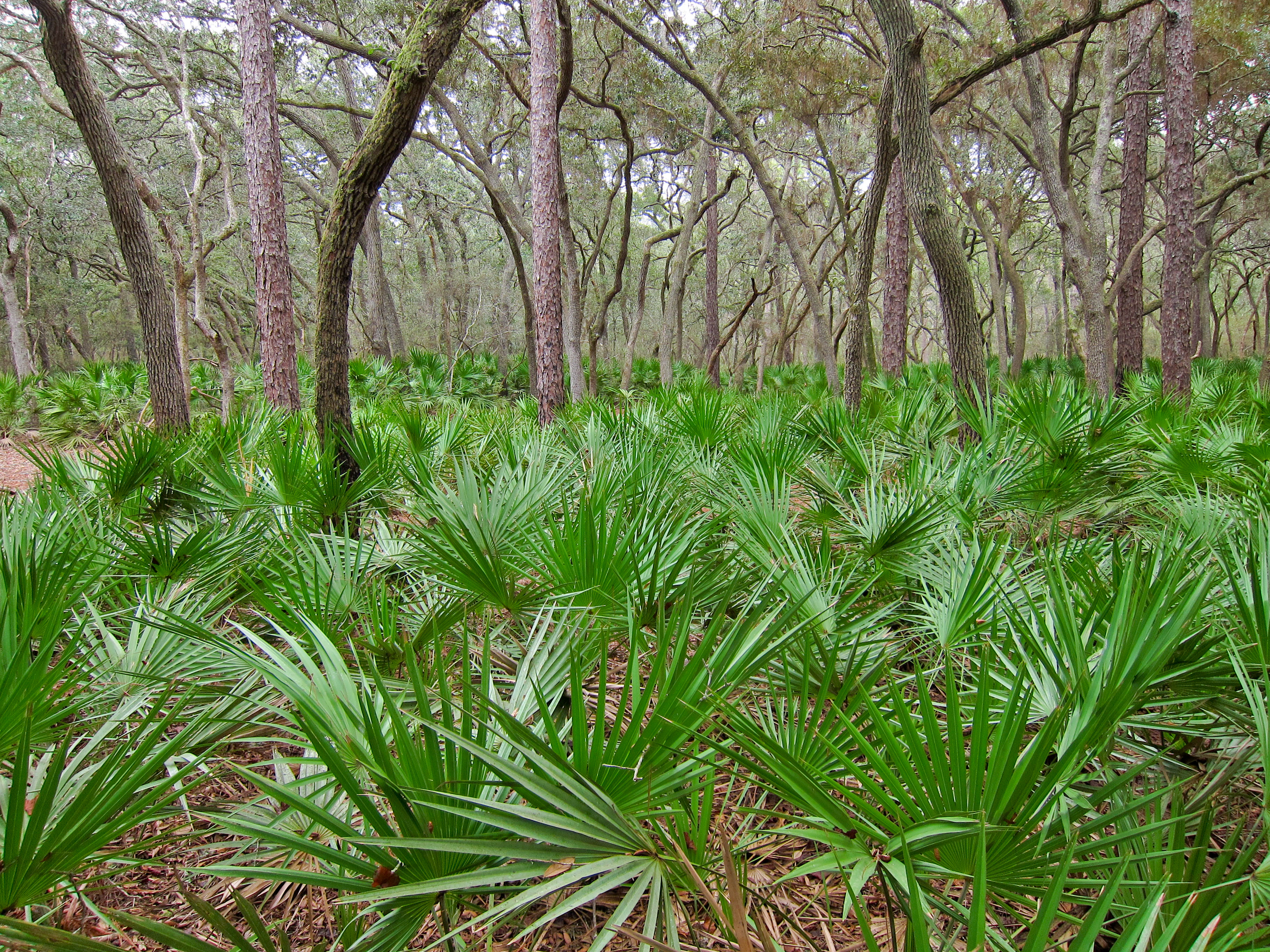
In Manatee Springs State Park, Florida

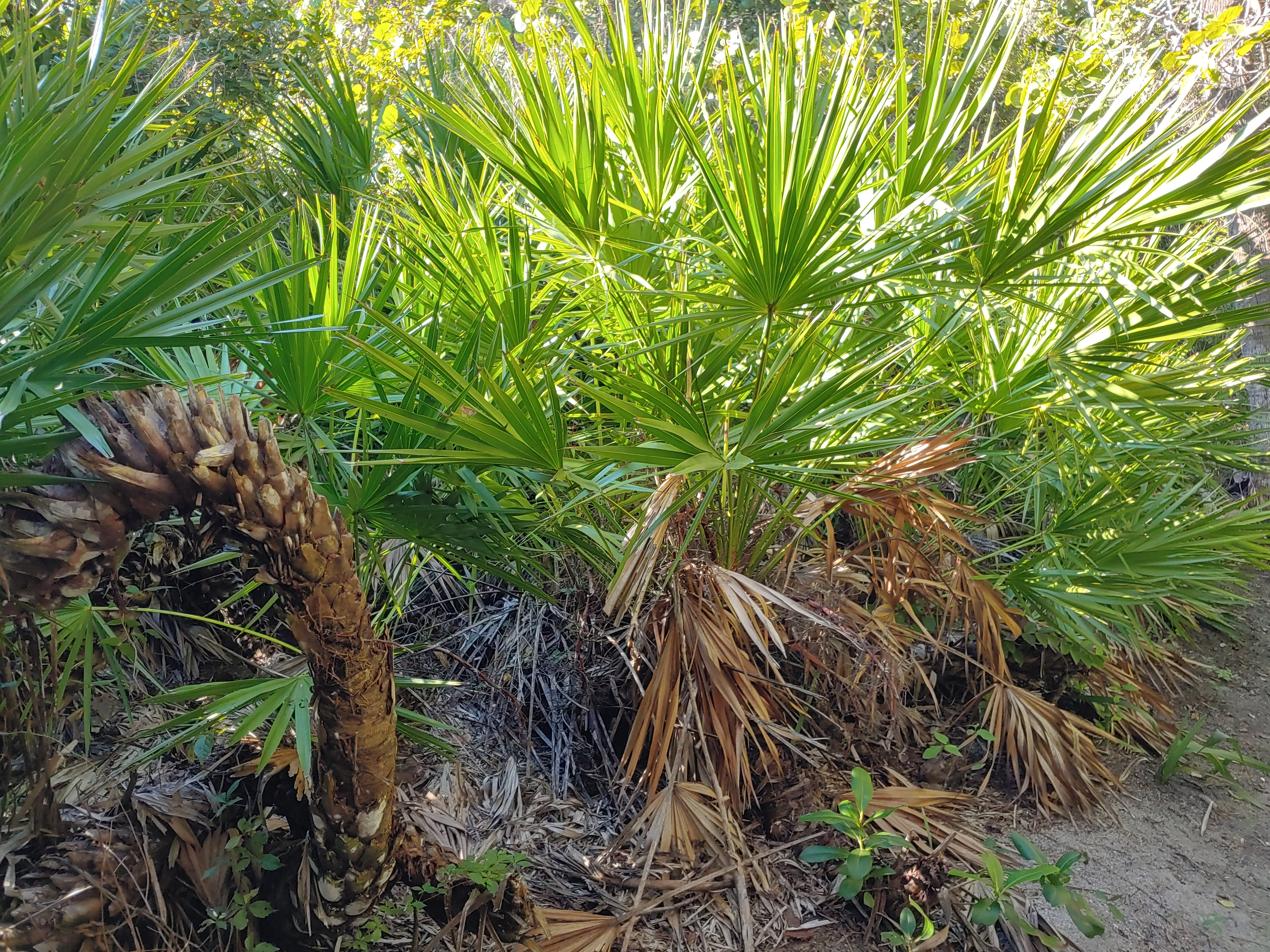
Winding trunks of an old clump, Manasota Key, Florida

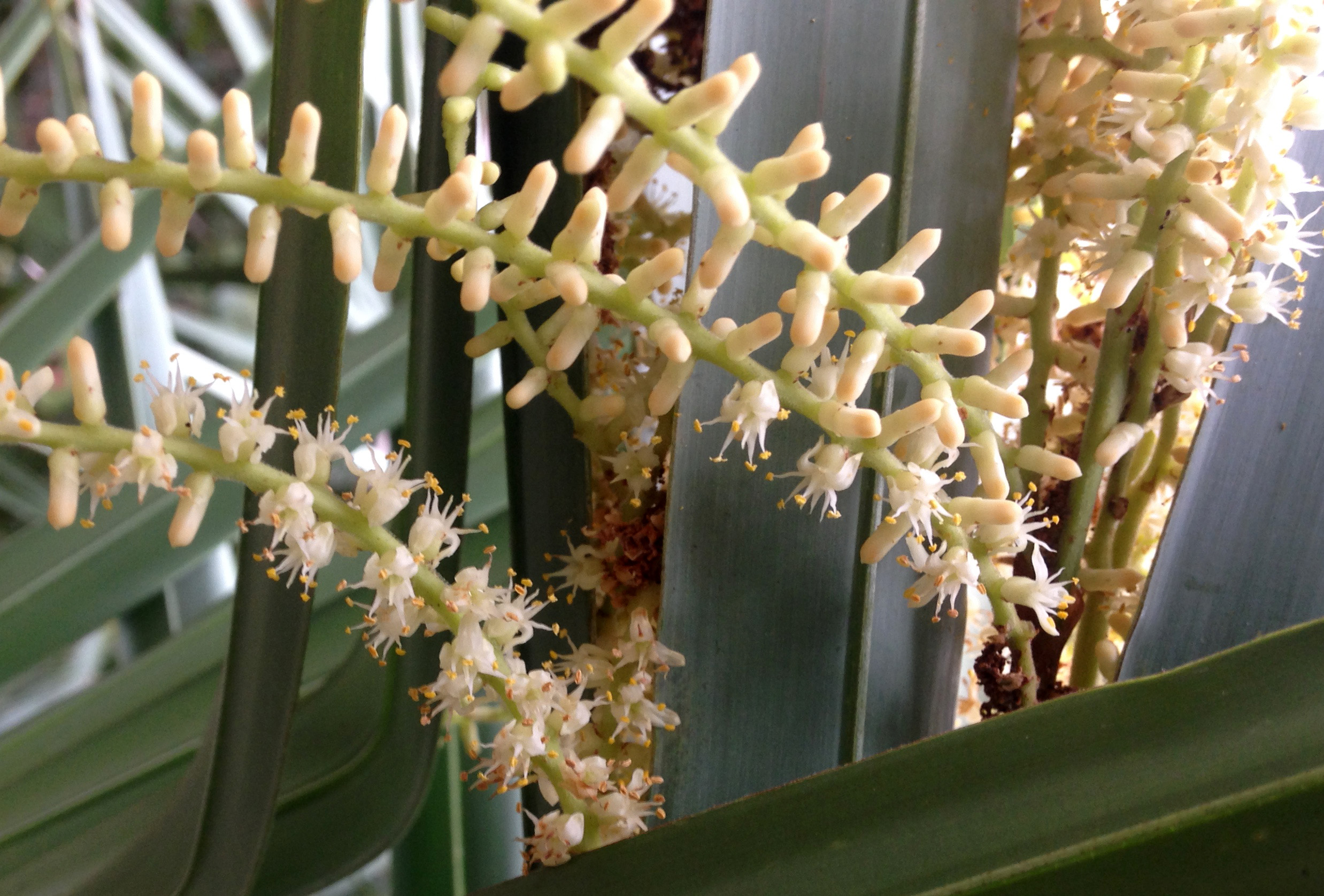
Detail of flowers

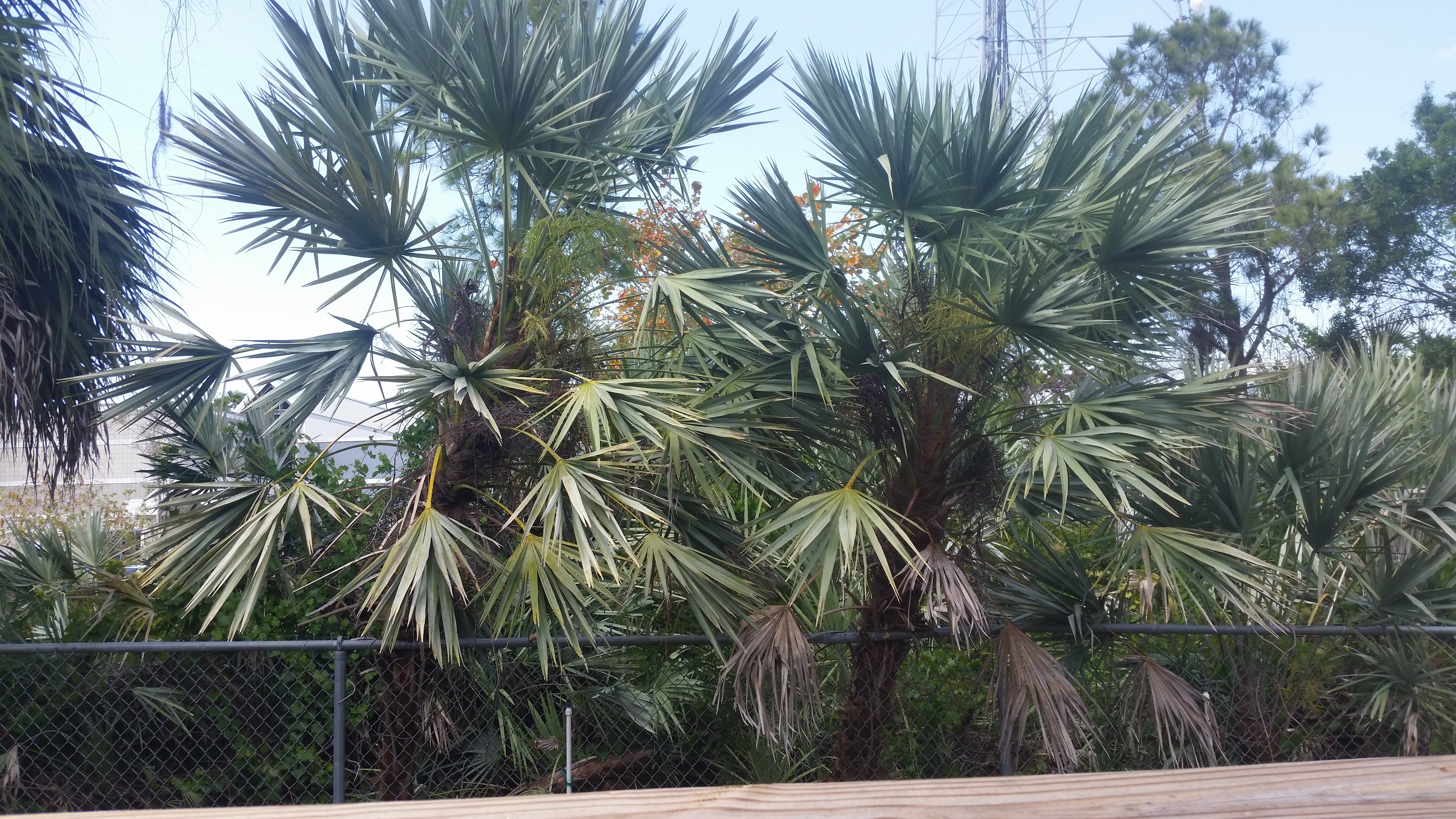
A very old example of the silver variant, Largo, Florida

== Ecology ==
The fruit is a large reddish-black drupe and is an important food source for wildlife and historically for humans. The plant is used as a food plant by the larvae of some Lepidoptera species such as Batrachedra decoctor, which feeds on the plant, including the interior of the inflorescence.

== Medical research ==
Saw palmetto extract has been studied as a possible treatment for people with prostate cancer and for men with lower urinary tract symptoms associated with benign prostatic hyperplasia (BPH). As of 2023, there is no scientific evidence that saw palmetto extract is effective for treating cancer or BPH and its symptoms.

One 2016 review of clinical studies with a standardized extract of saw palmetto (called Permixon) found that the extract was safe and may be effective for relieving BPH-induced urinary symptoms compared against a placebo. However, a 2023 review of 27 studies found that saw palmetto provides little to no benefit for BPH symptoms. Regarding urinary tract infection symptoms in males with BPH, there are now many studies indicating that it does not appear to be helpful.

== Ethnobotany ==
Indigenous names are reported to include: tala or talimushi ("palmetto's uncle") in Choctaw; cani (Timucua); ta ́:la (Koasati); taalachoba ("big palm", Alabama); ta:laɬ a ́ kko ("big palm", Creek); talco ́:bˆı ("big palm", Mikasuki); and guana (Taíno, possibly). Saw palmetto fibers have been found among materials from indigenous people as far north as Wisconsin and New York, strongly suggesting this material was widely traded prior to European contact. The leaves are used for thatching by several indigenous groups, so commonly that a location in Alachua County, Florida, is named Kanapaha ("palm house"). The fruit may have been used to treat an unclear form of fish poisoning by the Seminoles and Lucayans.
