= Tribal town =

Form of political and social organization

A tribal town (Muscogee talwa, Hitchiti okla) was a form of political and social organization of people in what is now the southeastern United States from at least the 16th century into the 19th century. It had aspects of both a town and a tribe, and was the basic unit of the Muscogee Confederacy (historically called the "Creek" (Note: After several tribal towns that had previously been located along the Chattahoochee River (see Apalachicola Province) moved to Ochese Creek (later renamed Ocmulgee River), the English started calling them "Ochese Creek Indians". The English continued calling the people of those towns "Creek Indians" after the towns moved back to the Chattahoochee River. The tribal towns along the Chattahoochee River became known as the "Lower Creeks", while tribal towns in Alabama and Tennessee that were also members of the Muscogee Confederacy became known as the "Upper Creeks". While tribal towns whose people spoke the Muscogee language dominated the Muscogee confederacy, many member towns spoke other languages, including Hitchiti, Alabama, Koasati, Yuchi, and others. The use of the term "Creek Indians", which includes Muscogees and other peoples, is often offensive to the descendants of those people.) Confederacy). Tribal towns were governed by a council of men (and, very rarely, women) of the town who were selected or had obtained recognized status as warriors. Tribal towns in the Muscogee Confederacy were classified as either "white" (peace) towns or "red" (war) towns. The men in each town were divided into white and red sides.

== Organization ==
A tribal town (Note: Called talwa, idalwa, i:dalwa, or talwu by Muscogee speakers, or okla by Hitchiti speakers.) had characteristics of a town and of a tribe. It consisted of a main settlement, centered on a ceremonial square, associated satellite settlements (Muscogee talofa) which did not have a ceremonial square, and individual farmsteads. The tribal town also included hunting grounds and agricultural fields. Lankford defines a tribal town as "a group of people united in having a single square ground and a single sacred fire kept in the middle of the square". People living in separate locations could be members of one tribal town based on one square ground with one sacred fire and a single governing council. People of the Muscogee Confederacy identified primarily as members of their tribal town, and only rarely as Muscogees. Whites often saw the tribal towns as tribes, using the terms "town", "tribe", and even "clan" interchangeably.

The main settlement of a tribal town had a "square ground" or plaza, which was central to the social life of the tribal town. Four buildings surrounded the sacred fire in the middle of the square ground. Square or rectangular, the plaza was kept clean by sweeping, with the removed material often forming a berm around the plaza. When the men of a town were home, they spent much of the day at the plaza, socializing and playing games such as chunkey and "roll the bullet" (Muscogee thlechallitchcau). The plazas were also used for dancing and drinking. Adjacent to the rectangular buildings on the square-ground, tribal towns also had a rotunda or "hot house" (Note: Before the southeastern tribal towns became heavily engaged with Europeans in the deerskin trade early in the 18th century, with many adults living in the woods hunting deer during the winter, individual households had included a "hot house", a round house with a sunken floor and a central fireplace, with fully enclosed wattle and daub walls, used as winter lodging. A rotunda was seen as a larger version of a residential "hot house".) (Muscogee tcokofa), a large round structure with wattle and daub walls and a central fireplace. The rotunda was used for town council meetings during cold weather, and as a communal sleeping space in the winter. The size of a town's rotunda varied, but could be up to 50 metres (160 ft) across. Tribal towns had a dedicated field on the outskirts of the town where stickball games were played.

== White and red ==
Many of the people of the southeast viewed parts of their world in terms of a duality. The two sides of the duality are often listed as "white" and "red" in sources, although Swanton noted that the people of the southeast rarely used color terms for the concept. Lankford cautions that the usage of the duality of "red" and "white" in Muscogee culture has changed over time, and that historical sources on "red" and "white" towns and clans must be used very carefully, as European observers often did not fully understand, and possibly thoroughly misunderstood, the uses of the terms. The division into red and white towns had a long history in the southeast. Towns were either red or white, but in a different meaning than the internal division of the council. Stickball games were always between towns of opposite colors. Town color was not immutable. If a town lost three games in a row to another town, the losing town had to change color. The division of responsibilities between red and white towns may have changed over time. For example, among Chickasaw towns, red towns first handled all trade with Europeans, but white towns eventually gained some control of the trade. The Chickasaws symbolically adopted new towns as "peace" (white) towns. The Muscogee Confederacy also admitted new towns as "peace" or white towns. Provinces in the Confederacy, originally including the Lower Towns, Abihka, and Tallapoosa, had both white and red towns, and the Alabama were admitted to the Confederacy as a group that included red and white towns. White towns were also sanctuaries. Someone trying to escape retaliation could seek refuge in a white town, because blood was not supposed to be spilled in a white town. The duties associated with red and white towns, including white towns serving as sanctuaries, appear to have been reduced by early in the 19th century.

== Governance ==
Each tribal town was internally self-governing, with a town council handling disputes and punishing offenders. Each town had a civil chief (Muscogee micco) and a war chief ("Tustenuggee" Muscogee tvstvnvke). The council had a white side and a red side. The white side of the council consisted of the chief, his assistant (Muscogee heniha), and the "second men" (Muscogee henihalgi), one of whom was the chief's speaker (Muscogee yatika). Members of the white side were selected by various processes. The red side was subordinate to the white side. It was led by the war chief. Men, and an occasional woman, who had become warriors joined the red side as tasikayalgi. Achievements as a warrior led to promotion to imathlas, and then to "war chiefs" (Muscogee tastanagalgi). Warriors who were no longer physically able to go to war and had distinguished themselves in service to the town crossed over to the white side of the council as "beloved men" (Muscogee isti atcacagi).

The civil chief was chosen from a clan of the same color as the town and, in many cases, chosen by the clans of the other color, i.e., the civil chief of a white town would be chosen from a white clan by the red clans, and the civil chief of a red town would be chosen from a red clan by the white clans. No matter the "color" of his clan, the civil chief belonged to the white side after his selection. The civil chief chose a war chief from the red clans. The war chief advised the civil chief on matters relating to war, and was responsible for maintaining public order and organizing stickball games with other towns. The second men were responsible for public works (including construction of new houses), the town's common fields, and the brewing of the black drink for town council meetings.

Power and status in a town was derived from inheritance, age, religious role, oratory, and success in warfare. The town councils ruled by consensus. Political decisions made in town councils applied only to members of the town and were non-binding. The civil chief presided over council meetings, but his power was "more of a council manager than an executive."

== Clans ==
Clans were also involved in local governance, controlling specific agricultural fields and performing specific duties. Some town leadership positions were reserved for members of particular clans. Clans were responsible for handling disputes between clan members, and punishing individuals for infractions within the clan. Disputes between clans were handled by the town council. Inheritance was matriarchal, and children were born into their mothers' clan and town. The Muskogean society was exogamous and matrilocal, requiring people to marry outside of their birth clan, with the males often living with their wives' clan, and the women living with their own clan.

== Satellite settlements ==
Satellite settlements could form when the population became too large, farm fields lost fertility, or firewood in reasonable distance became scarce. Satellites were also often created when some group in conflict with others in the town wished to distance themselves without breaking ties with the town. Satellite settlements could be quite close to the main town, sometimes just across a river, or further away, in the next river valley. Some of the tribal towns on the Chattahoochee River had satellite towns 60 miles (97 km) away on the Flint River, about two days travel time. The number of satellite settlements a tribal town had varied over time. At one point late in the 18th century, Tukabatchee (one of the Muscogee Confederacy's four mother towns) did not have any satellite towns, while Okfuskee had seven or more. Just as some satellite towns might be settled by a group avoiding some conflict in the town, relations might later improve and the people of the satellite town would return to the tribal town. Some satellite towns are reported to have eventually built their own square-grounds and council houses, becoming a new tribal town. Members of a town who could not reconcile themselves with the decisions of a town council could leave and found a new town with help from their former town. During the time of the confederacy, a new tribal town was officially founded when a fire was started in the town with embers from one of the "mother towns".

== Muscogee Confederacy ==
The Muscogee Confederacy grew out of confederations or cooperatives of red and white tribal towns that existed before the arrival of Europeans in the southeast. The passage of Hernando de Soto's expedition through the southeast disrupted the existing political organization of the area. Powerful chiefdoms broke apart. There is evidence of population decrease, dispersal and migration after de Soto's passage. However, Foster notes that there is no evidence this had not also happened at times prior to de Soto's arrival.

The Muskogean Confederacy was governed by the Grand Council, an annual meeting of the chiefs of the tribal towns in the confederacy. Towns were divided into white and red groups. White clans and towns were generally associated with peace, while red clans and towns were generally associated with war. Four towns in the confederacy, Coweta and Tukabatchee, red towns, and Kasihta and Abihka, white towns, were the "mother towns", often assuming leadership in the confederacy.

Tribal towns were sovereign. Each tribal town, while a member of the confederacy, could also act on its own, choose to participate or not participate in collective actions, such as going to war, and form alliances with other towns. The towns had a strong sense of identity, with local variations of the Green Corn Ceremony, legends and myths. Immigrants (often refugees from other towns and tribes) could become members of the Creek Confederacy.

Ethridge states that under territorial pressure from Europeans, the Muscogee Confederacy changed, gradually suppressing the provincial identities and red/white town dichotomy and emphasizing the Upper Creek/Lower Creek organization as the Muscogee identity. Tukabatchee and Coweta began to claim status as the capitols of the Upper and Lower Muscogees, respectively.

== Sources ==
- O'Brien, Sharon (1989). American Indian Tribal Governments. Norman, Oklahoma: University of Oklahoma Press. pp. 20–23, 120, 320. ISBN 0-8061-2199-8.
- Ethridge, Robbie (2003). Creek Country: The Creek Indians and Their World. Chapel Hill, North Carolina: The University of North Carolina Press. pp. 95–96, 102. ISBN 0-8078-2827-0.
- Lankford, George E. (2008). Looking for Lost Lore: Studies in Folklore, Ethnology, and Iconography. Tuscaloosa, Alabama: The University of Alabama Press. pp. 76–77, 79–94, 159. ISBN 978-0-8173-1610-5.
- Swanton, John R. (October–December 1912). "A Forward on the Social Organization of the Creek Indians". American Anthropologist. 14 (4): 593–599. doi:10.1525/aa.1912.14.4.02a00020 – via Anthrosource.
- Foster, H. Thomas II (2007). Archaeology of the Lower Muskogee Creek Indians, 1715–1836. The University of Alabama Press. ISBN 978-0-8173-1239-8.
