= Coushatta =

Native American people

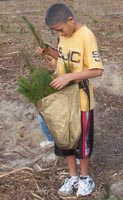
- Alabama-Coushatta boy planting Christmas trees in Texas

Total population
- Coushatta Tribe of Louisiana; 910 enrolled citizens Alabama-Coushatta Tribe of Texas; 1,000 enrolled Alabama-Quassarte Tribal Town; 380 enrolled

Regions with significant populations
- United States (Louisiana, Texas, Oklahoma)

Languages
- English, Spanish, French, Koasati language

Religion
- Christianity

Related ethnic groups
- Alabama, other Muscogee peoples

The Coushatta (Koasati: Koasati, Kowassaati or Kowassa:ti) are a Muskogean-speaking Native American people now living primarily in the U.S. states of Louisiana, Oklahoma, and Texas.

When the Coushatta first encountered Europeans, their Coushatta homelands were in present-day Tennessee, Georgia, and Alabama. They have long been closely allied and intermarried with the Alabama people, also members of the Creek Confederacy. The Koasati language is related to the Alabama language and mutually intelligible with the Mikasuki language.

Under pressure from European colonization after 1763 and the French defeat in the Seven Years' War, the Coushatta began to move west into Mississippi, Louisiana, and Texas, which were then under Spanish rule. They settled in these areas by the early 19th century. Some of the Coushatta and Alabama were removed west to Indian Territory (now Oklahoma) in the 1830s under Indian Removal, together with other Muscogee peoples.

Today, Coushatta people are enrolled in three federally recognized tribes:

- Alabama-Quassarte Tribal Town in Wetumka, Oklahoma
- Coushatta Tribe of Louisiana
- Alabama-Coushatta Tribe of Texas

== Language ==
The Koasati language is part of the Apalachee-Alabama-Koasati branch of the Muskogean languages. An estimated 200 people spoke the language in 2000, most of whom lived in Louisiana. The language is written in the Latin script.

== History ==
The Coushatta were historically farmers, growing a variety of maize, beans, and squash, and supplementing their diet by hunting game and fish. They are known for their skill at basketry. Nearly all the Spanish expeditions (including the 1539-1543 Hernando de Soto Expedition) into the interior of Spanish Florida recorded encountering the original town of the tribe. It was believed to be located in the Tennessee River Valley. The Spanish referred to the people as Coste, with their nearby neighbors being the Chiaha, Chiska, Yuchi, Tasquiqui, and Tali.

In the 17th and 18th centuries, avoiding the encroachment by European settlers, the Coushatta migrated west into present-day Alabama. Along the way they established their town at Nickajack (Ani-Kusati-yi, or Koasati-place, in Cherokee) in the current Marion County, Tennessee. Later they founded a major settlement at the north end of Long Island, which is bisected by the present-day Tennessee–Alabama state line.

By the time of the American Revolution, the Coushatta had moved many miles down the Tennessee River where their town is recorded as Coosada. In the 18th century, some of the Coushatta joined the emerging Muscogee (Creek) Confederacy, where they became a part of the "Upper Creeks". They were closely related to the Alabama Indians and often intermarried with them. Coushatta and Alabama who stayed in Alabama were part of the 1830s forcible removal to Indian Territory west of the Mississippi River. Today their descendants form the federally recognized Alabama-Quassarte Tribal Town in Wetumka, Oklahoma.

Some of the Coushatta tribe split from the Creek Confederacy and went to South Louisiana. Their descendants today make up the federally recognized Coushatta Tribe of Louisiana.

Notable chiefs among the Coushatta-Alabama were Long King and his successor Colita (1838–1852). They led their people to settle in present-day Polk County, Texas, in the late 18th and early 19th centuries. Colita's village was founded before the European-American settlement of Livingston, Texas. Descendants of these peoples form the federally recognized Alabama-Coushatta Tribe of Texas and have a reservation near Livingston.

=== 20th century to present ===
The Alabama-Quassarte Tribal Town in Wetumka, Oklahoma, achieved federal recognition in 1939, following passage of the 1936 Oklahoma Indian Welfare Act. Its people were descendants of a community that had moved as a group from their town in Alabama to Indian Territory in the 1830s. They settled together and maintained their tribal town identity. In addition, its people have dual citizenship in the federally recognized Muscogee (Creek) Nation, representing descendants of the broader Creek Confederacy. It has an enrolled population of 380.

In 1972, the Coushatta Tribe of Louisiana achieved state-recognition as a tribe. A year later it gained federal recognition. The tribe has acquired 685 acres (2.77 km^{2}) of reservation near its historical 18th and 19th-century homeland. This land is held in trust on the tribe's behalf by the United States Department of the Interior.

In the 20th century, the Coushatta people in Louisiana began cultivating rice and crawfish on tribally owned farms on the reservation, where most of the current population resides. An estimated 200 people of the tribe still speak the Coushatta language. In the early 21st century, fewer young people are learning it, so the tribe is working on language preservation.

Since the late 20th century and the rise in Indian self-determination, many Native American tribes have developed a new source of revenue by establishing gaming casino on their reservations which are sovereign territories. States, which had begun their own gaming operations and regulated private ones, and the federal government have passed legislation to control Indian gaming, which must conform to what exists by state law. While such revenues are not taxable by the states, tribes often negotiate agreements with the states to share some portion of income, in recognition of their reliance on state infrastructure and other assets. In the 1990s, the Coushatta of Louisiana hired the lobbyist Jack Abramoff to assist in establishing a casino on their reservation. They were victims of his manipulations, as he charged them high fees but did not work on their behalf to gain federal or state approval of such development. He was ultimately prosecuted for his actions.

Since then, Louisiana Coushatta have established gaming on its reservation. It also has state tax–free sales of certain items to raise revenues.

The Alabama-Coushatta Tribe of Texas achieved federal recognition in 1987. The nation acquired a 4,600-acre (19 km^{2}) reservation near Livingston, Texas, its homeland since settling in this area in the early 19th century. It has 1,100 enrolled citizens.

== Ethnobotany ==
A decoction of the leaves of sweet everlasting (Pseudognaphalium obtusifolium) is used for fevers. The Coushatta have historically bathed those with fevers with it.
