= Chokeelagee Creek =

Stream in Georgia, U.S.

Coordinates: 31°52′13″N 84°18′36″W

Chokeelagee Creek is a stream in the U.S. state of Georgia.

Chokeelagee is a name derived from the Muscogee language meaning "council house stands there creek". Variant names are "Chokeeliga Creek" and "Chokeeligee Creek".
