= Santiago X =

X, formerly Santiago X (b. 1982) is an Indigenous American multidisciplinary artist and architect working in land art, architecture, new media, and hip hop music.

X was born in Phoenix, Arizona. He is an enrolled citizen of the Coushatta Tribe of Louisiana (Koasati) and Indigenous Chamoru from the Island of Guam U.S.A (Hacha'Maori). As a child, he grew up in Guam, where his father was serving in the United States Air Force.

From 2004 to 2013, X was one-half of the band Santiago x The Natural. He graduated from the University of Notre Dame. X received a Bachelors of Environmental Design from the University of Colorado, a Masters of Architecture from the University of Southern California, and a Masters of Fine Arts Studio in Art and Technology from the School of the Art Institute of Chicago.

In 2020, he was commissioned by the U.S. State Department to serve as lead artist of The American Arts Incubator, Brazil. As part of the 2019 Chicago Architecture Biennial, X mounted two public installations along the Chicago and Des Plaines Rivers consisting of mound effigies and was the first Native American to be represented at the Biennial.

X describes himself as an Indigenous Futurist.

== Exhibitions ==
Since 2016, X has exhibited and created installations and land art internationally. In fall of 2019, Santiago X showed the piece SOLOKCI ITABITKA (WHERE GHOSTS DANCE) at the Making Space for Resistance: Past, Present, Future exhibition curated by the Indigenous Scholars of Architecture, Planning and Design at the Yale School of Architecture. In 2019, his work HAYO TIKBA (THE FIRE INSIDE) was commissioned by the Chicago Architecture Biennial. In 2018, he exhibited the light and sound work THE RETURN (o:lači okhiča) at ArsElectronica in Linz, Austria. His work was also featured in PORTAL a virtual reality exhibition, Expo 2010 Shanghai, and the Venice Biennale.

== Awards and recognition ==
- New City Top 50 Artist (2020)
- 3Arts Award (2019)
