= Alabama–Coushatta Tribe of Texas =

Native American tribe in Texas, United States

Alabama–Coushatta Tribe of Texas Albaamaha–Kosaatihaha Albaamoha–Kowassaatiha
- Indian reservation
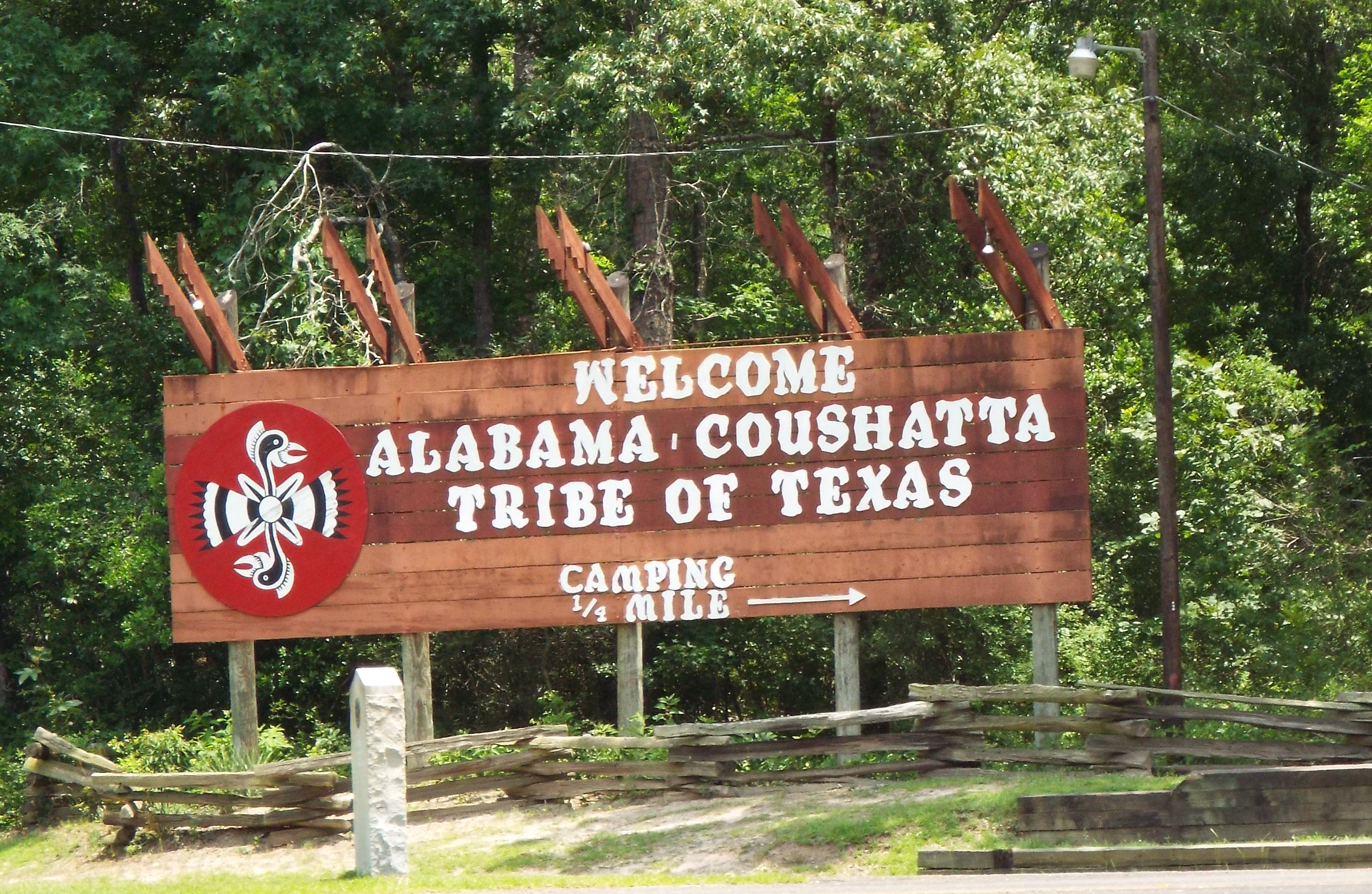
- Interactive map of Alabama–Coushatta Tribe of Texas
- Location in Texas Alabama–Coushatta Reservation (the United States)
- Coordinates: 30°42′49.89″N 94°40′22.97″W
- Country: United States
- State: Texas
- County: Polk
- Established: 1854

Government
  - Type: Tribal council
  - Chief: Donnis B. Battise
  - Tribal Council Chairman: Rick Sylestine
  - Tribal Council: Council Members: Nita Battise; Yolanda Poncho; Ronnie Thomas; Rolando Poncho; David Battise; Melanie Battise

Area
  - Total: 4,593.7 acres (1,859.0 ha)

Population (2020)
  - Total: 679
  - Density: 94.6/sq mi (36.5/km^{2})
- Time zone: UTC−05:00 (Central Time Zone)
  - Summer (DST): UTC−04:00 (Central Daylight Time)
- Area code: 936
- Website: https://www.alabama-coushatta.com

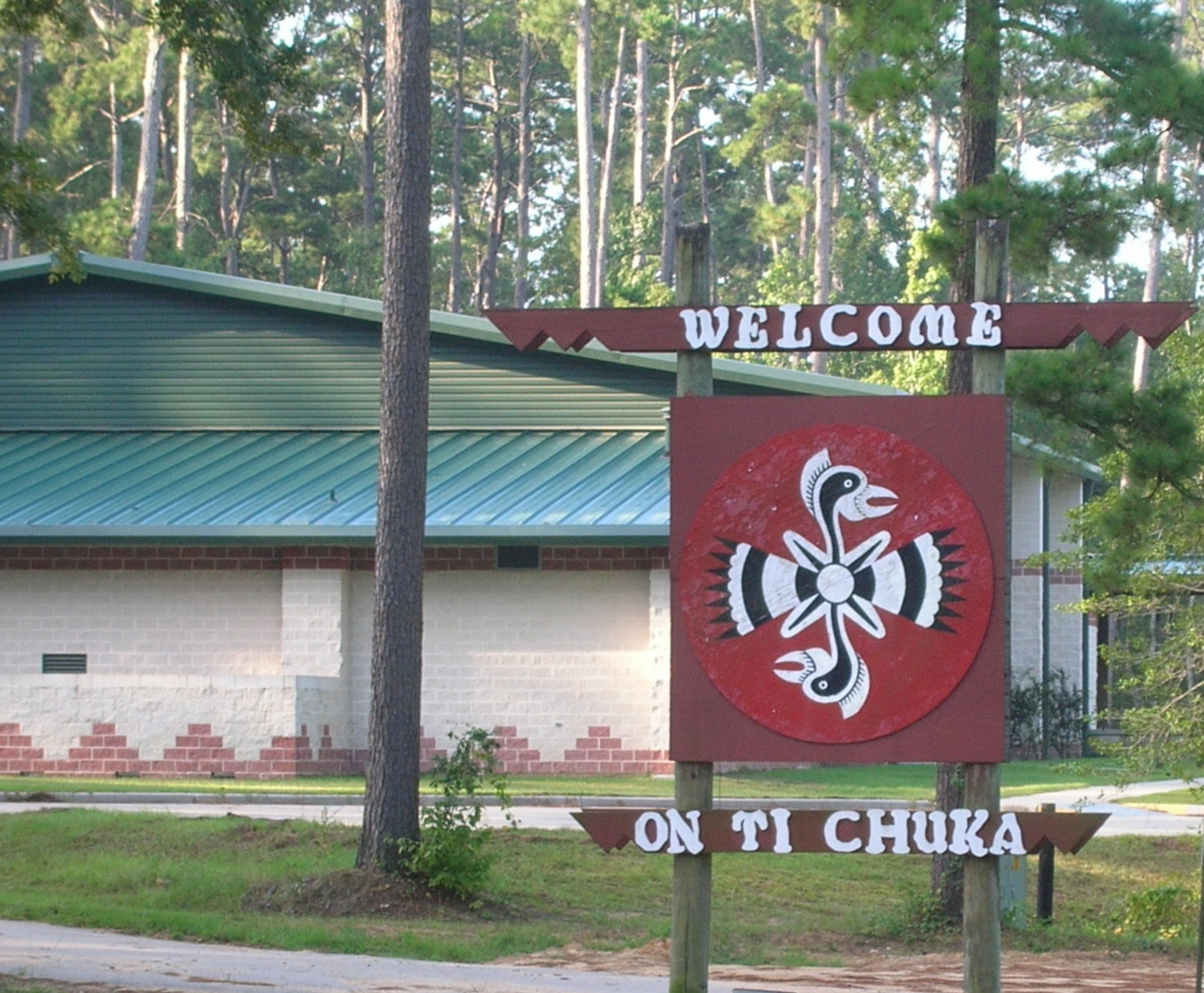
Smaller sign at the Alabama–Coushatta Reservation east of Livingston, Texas

The Alabama–Coushatta Tribe of Texas (Alabama: Albaamaha–Kosaatihaha, Coushatta: Albaamoha–Kowassaatiha) is a federally recognized tribe of Alabama and Koasati in Polk County, Texas, United States. These peoples are descended from members of the historic Muscogee or Creek Confederacy of numerous tribes in the Southeastern U.S., particularly Georgia and Alabama.

They are one of three federally recognized tribes in Texas. As of 2022, the tribe has over 1,200 citizens with 589 residing on the Texas reservation.

== History ==
They are one of eight federally recognized tribes whose citizens are descended from the Muscogee Confederacy of the Southeast. Four tribes are located in Oklahoma, where most of the Muscogee were forcibly removed from the Indigenous Muscogee homeland in Alabama and western Georgia in the 1830s during the Trail of Tears under Indian Removal. One tribe is in Louisiana, where another band of Muscogee fled European encroachment in two waves in the late 18th century and the early 19th century. Another tribe comprises the Poarch Band of Creeks, which remained in Alabama. The Seminole Indian Nation in Florida also includes many descendants of the Creek Confederacy who relocated there and merged with another tribe.

Under pressure from European American settlement, the ancestors of this tribe were Alabama and Coushatta peoples who migrated from Alabama and the Southeast into Louisiana and finally East Texas when it was under Spanish rule in the late 18th century. They settled in an area known as Big Thicket and adapted their culture to the environment of forests and waters.

When the area began to be settled by European Americans from the United States, the tribes established friendly relations and traded with the new settlers. Sam Houston helped protect them during years of conflicts with other Native Americans in the area. After the annexation of Texas by the United States, settlements increased and the tribes were under pressure again. They appealed to the state to set aside land for their exclusive use.

=== Termination efforts ===
As part of the Indian termination policy followed by the US government between the 1940s and 1960s, the Alabama Coushatta Tribe was targeted. On 23 August 1954, the United States Congress passed laws to terminate the federal relationship with the tribe. Public Law ch. 831, §1, 68 Stat. 768 provided that the Secretary of the Interior was to transfer to the State of Texas the tribal lands for the benefit of the tribe. In addition, it terminated the federal trust relationship with the tribe and the individual citizens of the tribe and canceled any federal debts. In 1965, under House Bill 1096, 59th Texas Legislature, Regular Session, the newly formed Texas Indian Commission took over state administration and supervision for the Alabama–Coushatta Indian Reservation.

On 22 March 1983, Texas Attorney General Jim Mattox released an opinion (JM-17) stating that the state's assumption of power over the property of the Alabama–Coushatta violated the Texas Constitution. He stated that as the federal government's withdrawal of its recognition, the tribe was "merely an unincorporated association under Texas law, with the same legal status as other private associations ... the 3,071-acre tract is entirely free from any legally meaningful designation as an 'Indian Reservation.'" In response to concerns by the tribe, Representative Ronald D. Coleman of Texas introduced a federal bill on 28 February 1985 to restore federal jurisdiction for the tribe. Because the initial bill, HR 1344, allowed gambling, amendments were made and the Yselta del Sur Pueblo and Alabama and Coushatta Indian Tribes of Texas Restoration Act was reintroduced as HR 318. Public Law 100–89, 101 STAT. 666 was enacted on 18 August 1987 and restored the federal relationship with the tribe. Section 207 (25 U.S.C. § 737) specifically prohibits all gaming activities prohibited by the laws of the state of Texas.

Both the Alabama and Koasati languages are Muskogean languages.

== Reservation ==
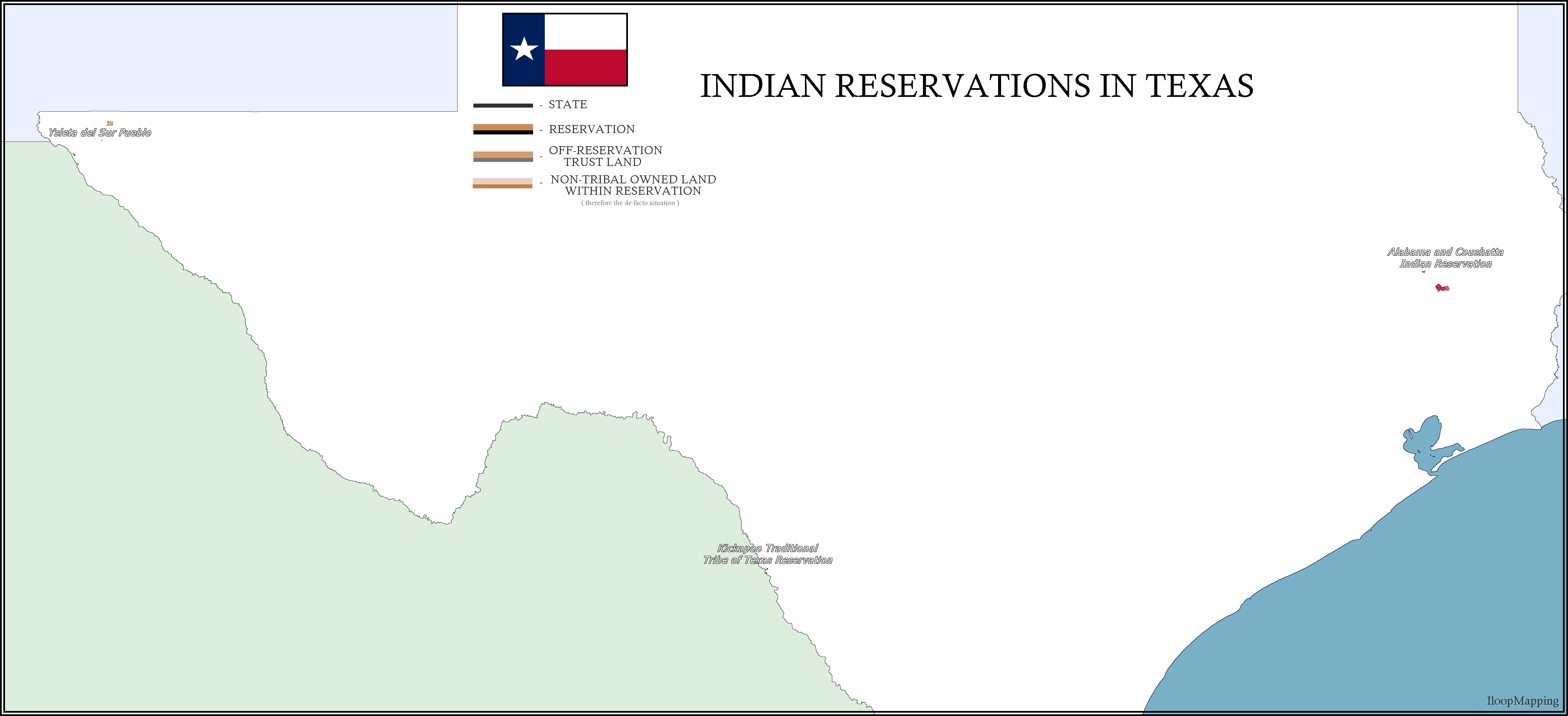
Map of the Alabama-Coushatta Reservation and neighboring reservations (In red).

The Alabama–Coushatta Reservation was established in 1854, when the state bought 1,110.7 acres (449.5 ha) of land for the Alabama Indian reservation. About 500 tribe members settled on this land during the winter of 1854–55. In 1855, the Texas legislature appropriated funds to purchase 640 acres (260 ha) for the Coushattas, but never followed through. The Coushatta began to live with the Alabama on their reservation.

They acquired more land, so the reservation is now 4,593.7 acres (1,859.0 ha), located 17 miles (27 km) east of Livingston, Texas, in the Big Thicket area.

== Demographics ==
As of the 2020 census, the reservation comprises a total population of 679 individuals. Of those individuals, 86.7% (589) are American Indian, 8.2% (56) are Hispanic or Latino, 6.4% (44) identify as two or more races, 5.5% (38) are White, 0.88% identify as some other race, and 0.14% (1) are African American or Black. The reservation has a young population, with 42.3% under the age of 18 in contrast to 4.5% over the age of 65.

Economically, 65.9% of the population is employed. The average household earning is $49,219, which is over $10,000 less than the national average, and 17.2% live in poverty, 8.6% higher than the national average. Additionally, 11.4% of the population has a bachelor's degree or higher, and 36.5% has only a high school degree or equivalent. Of the total population, 38.5% do not have at-home internet, which is 11.5% higher than the national average of 14.5%.

The homeownership rate on the reservation is 76.3%, which is 10.9% higher than the national average of 65.4%.

== Environment ==
The tribe has its own wildland fire department and land management program that uses fire suppression tactics to manage the woodlands on their tribal land. This is particularly important for the longleaf pine trees that have been used by the tribe and their ancestors for basketry and homebuilding for centuries. According to The Nature Conservancy, 95% of the region's longleaf pine forests have been lost. Longleaf pines are dependent on fire to seed and grow. The Nature Conservancy funded the tribe to buy equipment and participate in training for wildland management. As a result, they manage the over 200 acres (81 ha) of pine trees they planted in 2012 and the additional 200 acres (81 ha) of older growth trees.

== Government ==
The Alabama–Coushatta Tribe of Texas is headquartered in Livingston, Texas. They operate as a tribal council, with a principal chief and chief serving as advisors to an elected tribal council comprising a chair, vice chair, and five additional members. The tribe's constitution and by-laws were adopted on June 16, 1971.

As of May 2024, the tribal chiefs and council members are:

- Principal chief: Donnis B. Battise
- Second chief: Millie Thompson Williams
- Council member: Rick Sylestine, tribal council chairman
- Council member: Nita Battise, vice chair
- Council member: Crystal Stephenson, treasurer
- Council member: Melanie Batisse, secretary
- Council member: Tina Battise, member
- Council member: Yolanda Poncho, member

Principal Chief Donnis B. Batisse was inaugurated as Mikko Choba or principal chief on January 1, 2023. Millie Thompson Williams was inaugurated as Mikko Istimatokla, or second chief/vice chief, on January 1, 2023. She is the first female to serve as second chief for the Alabama–Coushatta Tribe.

== Economy ==
The Alabama and Coushatta people of Polk County struggled after the Civil War, as few spoke English and they had difficulty finding jobs. Today, the tribe operates two primary economic enterprises: Naskila Casino, a casino, and A.C.T. Holdings, an investment and economic development LLC. The tribe also has a 26-acre campground open to the public located on Lake Tombigbee. The reservation also includes a truck stop, a smoke shop, and a souvenir shop.

In the tribe's earlier years in Texas, gathering, hunting, agriculture, fishing, and trading were its main economic pursuits. In more recent years, the Alabama–Coushatta Tribe has relied on the service and entertainment industry to generate revenue and jobs on the reservation. In 2002, the Tribe opened a convenience store, gas station and tobacco store on U.S. Highway 190, which can sell products tax free because of the tribe's sovereign status. This business complex is slowly becoming profitable. The station generates a small profit margin and a limited number of jobs.

The Tribe opened an entertainment center for tourists. The center offered casino gambling. The tribe believed it satisfied requirements of the 1992 Texas Lottery Law that permitted the state lottery, horse racing, and dog racing. The Alabama–Coushatta, a Christian community, allows no alcohol in the casino.

The Tribe was successful in generating revenue and jobs. The center offered jobs to 87 tribal citizens, greatly reducing unemployment from 46 percent to 14 percent. Revenues from the entertainment center provided the Tribe with funding for health services, the elderly, educational opportunities for youth, social services, and housing. Such jobs had a multiplier effect within the regional economy, with businesses' reporting an increase in sales and tax revenues. The entertainment center benefited not only the Tribe, but also the surrounding regions by creating more than 495 jobs and paying US$4.3 million in wages and nearly US$400,000 in federal taxes.

After the center had operated for nine months, the state brought suit against it in 1999. A Federal court ruled that the Alabama–Coushatta had to close their entertainment center. The federal courts made this determination based on the conditions of federal recognition in 1987, which banned tribes from gaming prohibited under state laws.

In July 2006 the Alabama–Coushatta sued lobbyist Jack Abramoff and his associates for attempts to defraud the tribe in seeking to defeat state legislation in 2001 that would have given them authority to run the casino. The tribe claimed the lobbyists had hidden their motives in representing the competing Coushatta of Louisiana, which ran their own casino, and mobilized Christian groups in an underhanded way. A Senate investigation in 2006 revealed that several tribes were defrauded of tens of millions of dollars by Abramoff and associates on issues associated with Indian gaming.

The four tribes that Abramoff persuaded to hire him were all newly wealthy Indian gaming tribes. They included: Michigan's Saginaw Chippewa, California's Agua Caliente, the Mississippi Choctaw, and the Louisiana Coushatta. The Abramoff scandal received widespread public attention and he was prosecuted.

On March 29, 2008, Jack Abramoff was sentenced to five years and ten months in prison for pleading guilty to fraud, tax evasion, and conspiracy to bribe public officials. Abramoff made a deal to cooperate with investigators to provide information about his relationships with several members of Congress. Federal sentencing guidelines indicated a minimum sentence of 108 months in prison. Because of Abramoff's cooperation with the government, his sentence was greatly reduced. He was released from prison on June 8, 2010, and completed the remaining six months of his sentence in a halfway house in Baltimore.

Without the casino, the tribe has no funding for economic programs. More than 300 jobs have been lost in Polk County. The Alabama–Coushatta Tribe has been trying to gain state and Federal support to re-open the entertainment center, for the economy of both the Tribe and the surrounding regions. Over the years, the Tribe has struggled to rebuild its economy in a depressed Polk County.

We should be candid about the interests surrounding Indian gaming. The issue has never really been one of crime control, morality, or economic fairness...At issue is economics...Ironically, the strongest opponents of tribal authority over gaming on Indian lands are from States whose liberal gaming policies would allow them to compete on an equal basis with the tribes...We must not impose greater moral restraints on Indians than we do on the rest of our citizenry. - Daniel Inouye, senior United States senator from Hawaii.

The Indian Gaming Regulatory Act (IGRA), passed by Congress in 1988 (after the act that restored federal recognition to the Alabama–Coushatta), established the framework that governs Indian gaming. The IGRA allows tribes to develop casino-style operations that could improve governmental services and economic conditions in Indian country. According to the IGRA, tribes have the "exclusive right" to regulate gaming in Indian Territory "except when gambling is contrary to federal law or when a state completely prohibits a form of gaming." The IGRA recognizes three different classes of gaming:

- Class I Gaming: Includes traditional tribal gambling, such as stick and bone games
- Class II Gaming: Includes bingo, pull tabs, etc.
- Class III Gaming: Includes large-scale gambling operations

Class I gaming is controlled completely by the tribes. Class II gaming is regulated by the tribes with oversight by the National Indian Gaming Commission. Class III gaming may be allowed in a state that allows large-scale gambling operations, even if it allows only low-level operations. Also, Class III gaming is subject to agreed regulatory procedures in Tribal-State compacts, which states are required to negotiate in "good faith". Without a tribal-state compact, no tribal casino can be permitted.

Tribes find fault with the provision about Tribal-State compacts, because under the Eleventh Amendment, which provides for state sovereign immunity, tribes are not able to sue any state to enforce the requirement to enter into such compacts. Thus, while the IGRA gives tribes the right to have casinos, the Eleventh Amendment gives the states the right to refuse to negotiate tribal-state compacts.

The Indian Gaming Regulatory Act requires that gaming revenues be used only for governmental or charitable purposes. The tribal governments determine how gaming revenues are spent. They are typically used to invest in infrastructure for tribal citizens, such as housing, schools, and roads; to fund health care and education; and to develop a strong economy.

Indian gaming is considered the most powerful economic development tool available on most Indian reservations. The National Gaming Impact Study Commission has stated that "no...economic development other than gaming has been found." Tribal governments also use gaming revenues to develop other economic enterprises, such as museums, malls, and cultural centers that attract tourists and other visitors. Indian gaming can provide substantial economic benefits in states where a tribe and state work together.

=== Naskila Casino ===
The casino comprises over 790 bingo games in an over 30,000-square-foot facility. The tribe has engaged in two lawsuits against the State of Texas regarding the casino. In 2001, the tribe filed a complaint against the state for officials obstructing the tribe's legal right to operate a casino on tribal land. That resulted in a ruling in favor of the state, prohibiting the tribe from operating their casino. In 2016, Texas filed a complaint against the tribe to stop the tribe from operating a bingo hall. The judge ruled in favor of the tribe because bingo is not prohibited in Texas. In December 2021, the tribe joined Ysleta del Sur Pueblo to file an amicus brief with the United States Supreme Court to ensure their rights to operate bingo halls on their reservations. The Supreme Court agreed to review the case on its docket in 2022. On June 15, 2022, the court sided with both tribes in a 5-4 ruling. The judgment was vacated, and the case was remanded to the lower court.

== Culture ==
In 1994, ground was broken for the now-open Alabama–Coushatta Cultural Center. In April 2022, the tribe broke ground on the 49,000-square-foot Aati Imaabachi Imiisa Education Center to house the education department, library, a gym, play areas, and youth education programs.

The reservation has two churches: Christian First Assembly of God Church and a First Indian Presbyterian Church.

Each June, the reservation hosts a powwow.
