= Coushatta Tribe of Louisiana =

Indian tribe in Louisiana, United States

Kowassaatiha

Total population
- 910

Regions with significant populations
- United States (Louisiana)

Languages
- English, Koasati

Religion
- Traditional tribal religion, Protestant Christianity

Related ethnic groups
- Other Koasati people

The Coushatta Tribe of Louisiana (Coushatta: Kowassaatiha) is one of three federally recognized tribes of Koasati people. They are located in Allen and Jefferson Davis Parishes, Louisiana. The tribe hosts an annual pow wow during the second weekend in June.

== Reservation ==
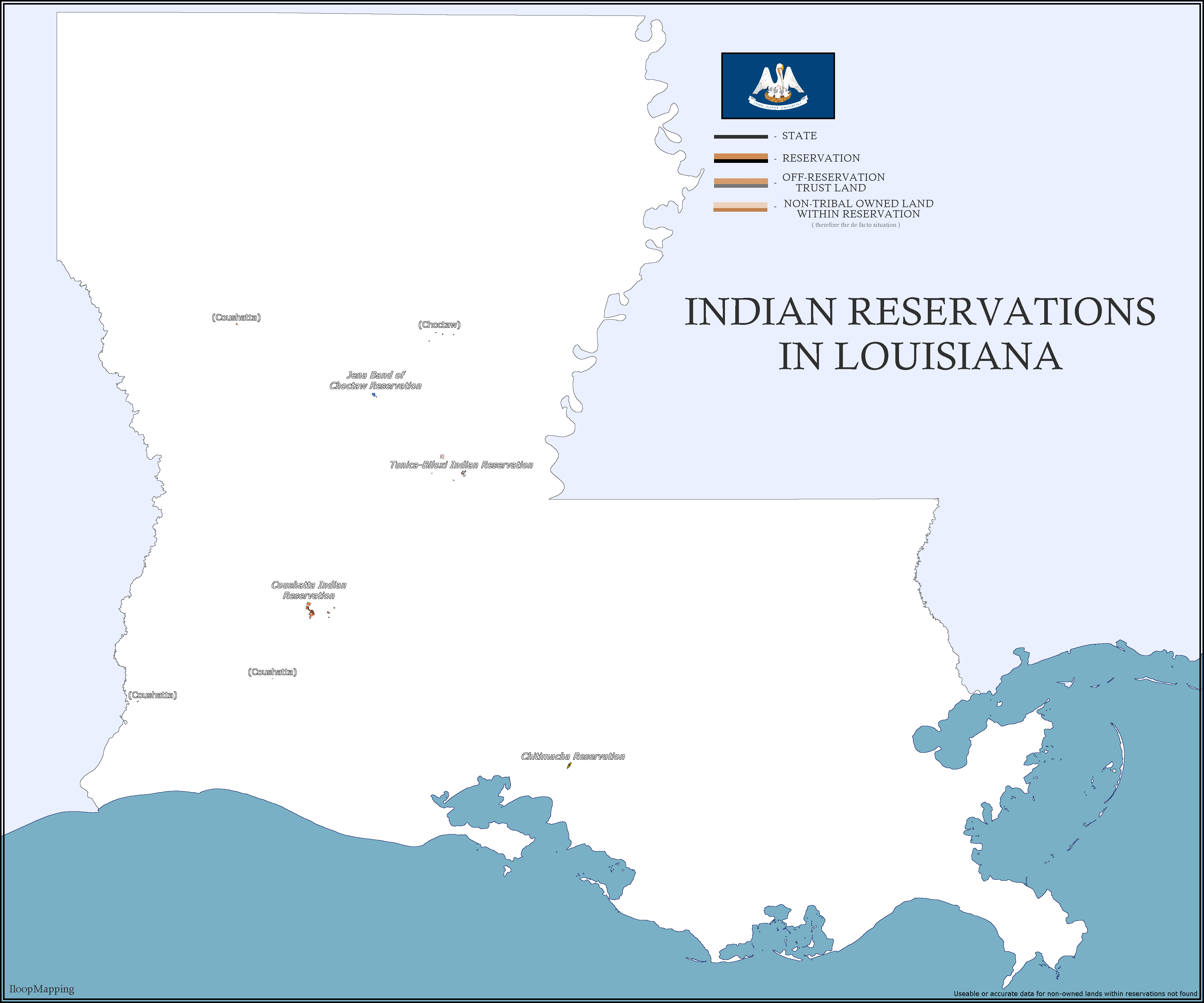
Map of the Coushatta and neighboring tribes.

The Coushatta Indian Reservation is located on 154-acres in Allen Parish, Louisiana. Approximately 400 people lived on the reservation in the 1990s. The reservation has a tribal police department, fire department, and court house. There is also a tribal medical facility, fitness center, and event center.

== Language ==
The Koasati language is part of the Apalachee-Alabama-Koasati branch of the Muskogean languages. An estimated 200 people spoke the language in 2000, most of whom lived in Louisiana. Historically, the language was spoken exclusively among tribal members and was never written down.

In 2007, along with McNeese State University, the tribe received a National Science Foundation (NSF) grant for documenting endangered language (DEL); this provided necessary resources to document and preserve the Koasati language.

== Government ==
The Coushatta Tribe of Louisiana is headquartered in Elton, Louisiana. The tribe is a sovereign nation and is governed by a democratically elected five-member council. The current administration is as follows:

- Chairman: Jonathan Cernek
- Vice–Chair: Crystal Williams
- Secretary-Treasurer: Kristian Poncho
- Council Member: Kevin Sickey
- Council Member: Loretta Williams.

F. A. Little, Jr. (Louisiana Coushatta, 1936–2024), a U.S. District Judge for the Western District of Louisiana, served as chief judge for the tribe for nine years.

== Economic development ==
The tribe owns and operates the Coushatta Casino Resort in Kinder, Louisiana. The casino is home to the Koasati Pines golf course. The casino operates multiple restaurants and hotels, and is the largest casino resort in the state. The casino employs over 2300 local residents, and it was the second largest employer in Southwest Louisiana in 2018.

== Notable tribal members ==
- Santiago X, multidisplinary artist, architect
