= Alabama people =

Indigenous people of the Southeastern Woodlands, U.S.

Alabama
Albaamaha
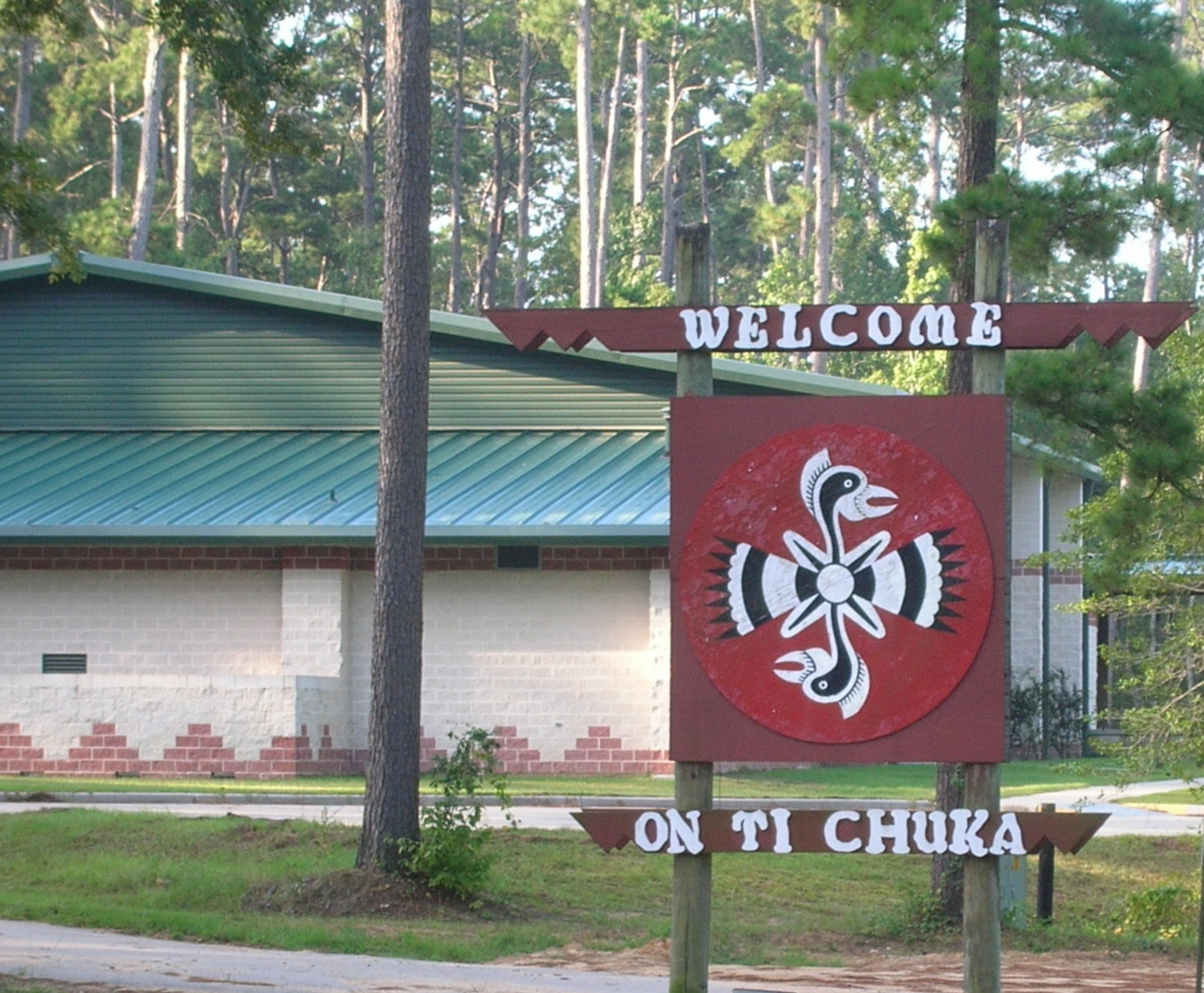
- Alabama-Coushatta Reservation, Texas

Total population
- 1,517

Regions with significant populations
- United States (Oklahoma): 380 enrolled citizens, Alabama–Quassarte Tribal Town
- United States (Texas): 1,137 enrolled citizens, Alabama–Coushatta Tribe of Texas

Languages
- Originally Alabama; however, most now only speak English

Religion
- Protestantism, traditional beliefs

Related ethnic groups
- Coushatta, Hitchiti, Chickasaw, Choctaw, Muscogee, and other Muskogean-speaking peoples

The Alabama or Alibamu (Alabama: Albaamaha) are an Indigenous people of the Southeastern Woodlands. Their historical homelands were in Alabama on the upper Alabama River, and they formed part of the Muscogee Creek Confederacy. Today they live in Oklahoma and Texas.

The Alabama and closely allied Coushatta migrated from Alabama and Mississippi to present-day Texas in the late 18th century and early 19th century, under pressure from American settlers to the east. They shared an Indian reservation and became a single Native American tribe, the Alabama-Coushatta Tribe of Texas. Its 1,137 citizens have about 4,500 acres (18 km^{2}) of reservation.

The Alabama–Quassarte Tribal Town is a federally recognized tribe, headquartered in Wetumka, Oklahoma.

== Language ==
The Alabama language is part of the Muskogean language family. Alabama is closely related to Koasati and distantly to Hitchiti, Chickasaw and Choctaw. Also known as Alibamu, an estimated 100 speakers, primarily from Texas, still speak the language.

== History ==
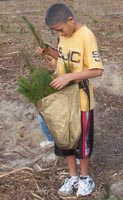
A boy from the Alabama-Coushatta reservation planting Christmas trees.

The Alabama first encountered Europeans when Hernando de Soto arrived in 1540 and visited numerous places during his expedition. In the 18th century, the French arrived on the Gulf Coast and built a fort at what became Mobile, Alabama.

The Alibamu and Koasati tribes were part of the Creek Confederacy. They had less contact with British colonists from the Thirteen Colonies than other Creek tribes did. They were the first to migrate away when British colonists began to settle in the region by the middle of the 18th century, after the land was ceded by the French following Britain's victory in the Seven Years' War (known in the colonies as the French and Indian War). Under pressure as well by Native American enemies, the Alabama and Coushatta tribes wanted to avoid the powerful Choctaw in present-day Mississippi. They moved into territories of future states, first into Louisiana and then into Texas.

Alabama and Coushatta towns were divided into "red" and "white" towns. The "white" towns were responsible for keeping the peace and for providing refuge, while the "red" towns were responsible for conducting military campaigns. Though they had "red" and "white" towns, the Alabama-Coushattas thought of themselves as peace-loving people.

In 1795, the Coushatta arrived in the Big Thicket area of East Texas. In 1805, nearly 1,000 Alabama came to Tyler County's Peach Tree Village in East Texas. The two tribes developed a strong friendship as they roamed and hunted their new land together. In the early 19th century, the Texas Congress granted each tribe two strips of land along the Trinity River. Their land was soon taken over by American settlers, leaving them homeless. Sam Houston, the governor of Texas, recommended that the state purchase 1,280 acres (5.2 km^{2}) for the Alabamas; although money was appropriated to buy 640 acres (2.6 km^{2}) for the Coushattas, the land was never bought. Either through marriage or special permission, many Coushatta went to live on the land given to the Alabama.

By 1820, the Alabama and the Coushatta each had three primary towns in the Big Thicket region of eastern Texas. In 1854, the Alabama were given 1,280 acres (5 km^{2}) in Polk County. The following year, 640 acres (2.6 km^{2}), also in Polk County, were given to the Coushattas. The Coushatta claim was disputed by white settlers in 1859. When the Coushatta lost the land claim, the Alabama invited them to live on their land claim.

The federal government approved a large grant in 1928 to purchase additional land near the reservation; it was granted to the "Alabama and Coushatta tribes". Since that time, the reservation has officially been known as "Alabama-Coushatta".

Origin stories focus on the interconnectedness of the tribes. One oral history states that the two tribes sprouted from either side of a cypress tree. In 1857, Se-ko-pe-chi, one of the oldest Muscogee in Indian Territory shared another origin story in 1857. He said that the tribes "sprang out of the ground between the Cohawba and Alabama Rivers." The emblem of the Alabama-Coushatta Tribe in Texas comes from precontact Mississippian culture: two intertwined woodpeckers, now symbolic of the connection between the two tribes.

== Cultural practices ==
=== Ethnobotany ===
The obtusifolium subspecies of the plant Pseudognaphalium obtusifolium is used in a compound decoction for nervousness and sleepiness, and in a decoction as a face wash for nerves and insomnia.

== Contemporary tribes ==
=== Texas ===
The Alabama who relocated to Texas supported Texas independence. In gratitude, Governor Sam Houston recommended that Texas purchase land for the tribe when their existing land was overtaken by settlers.

The two tribes share many cultural characteristics. In a hearing before the Indian Claims Commission in 1974, Dr. Daniel Jacobson suggested that the Alabama and Coushatta tribes were culturally related because of intermarriage. The Handbook of Texas reports that the languages come from the same stock, even though there could be some word variance.

They merged with the Coushatta to become the present-day Alabama-Coushatta Tribe of Texas. Although long under state trusteeship because the state controlled public lands, the tribe achieved Federal recognition in 1987 by an act of Congress, rather than by administrative process of the Department of Interior. The law that restored the tribe's federal relationship prohibited such gaming as was then prohibited under state laws.

The current tribal lands are in eastern Polk County, Texas. The Alabama-Coushatta Indian Reservation, Texas' oldest reservation, located at 30°42′50″N 94°40′26″W, has 18.484 km^{2} (7.137 sq mi) of land. The land purchased by the state and assigned to the Alabama in 1854 was expanded by another purchase, under a federal grant in 1928. The 2000 census reported a resident population of 480 persons within the reservation. As of 2010, there are some about 1,000 citizens of the Alabama-Coushatta tribe.

=== Oklahoma ===
In Okmulgee County, Oklahoma, Alabama and Coushatta people formed the Alabama–Quassarte Tribal Town, which was federally recognized in 1936. Other Alabama descendants are enrolled in the Muscogee Nation.

== See also ==
- List of Native American peoples in the United States
