= Muscogee language =

Indigenous American language

Muscogee
- Creek
- Mvskoke
- Pronunciation: [maskókî]
- Native to: United States
- Region: East central Oklahoma, Muscogee and Seminole, south Alabama Creek, Florida, Seminole of Brighton Reservation.
- Ethnicity: 100,000 Muscogee people (2024)
- Native speakers: <400 (2024)
- Language family: Muskogean: Eastern; Muscogee

Official status
- Official language in: Muscogee Nation

Language codes
- ISO 639-2: mus
- ISO 639-3: mus
- Glottolog: cree1270
- ELP: Muskogee
- Current geographic distribution of the Creek language

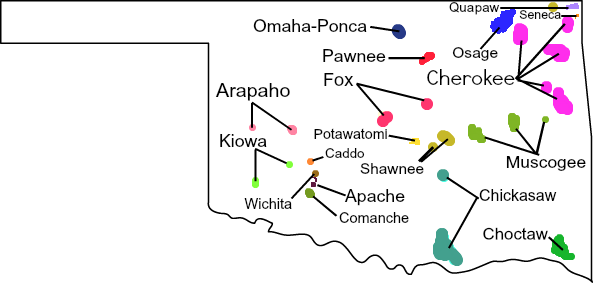
- Distribution of Native American languages in Oklahoma

The Muscogee language (also Muskogee [maskóːgi], Mvskoke [ma(ː)skóːgi]), previously referred to by its exonym, Creek, is spoken by Muscogee (Creek) and Seminole people, primarily in the US states of Oklahoma and Florida.

Muscogee was historically spoken by various constituent groups of the Muscogee confederacy in what are now Alabama and Georgia. In the early 18th century some Muscogee speakers began to join speakers of Hitchiti-Mikasuki in Florida. Combining with other ethnicities there, they emerged as the Seminole. During the 1830s, the US government forced most Muscogee and Seminole to relocate west of the Mississippi River, with most forced into Indian Territory. Muscogee was still spoken in the town of Oketeyeconne in Southwest Georgia until the mid 1950s.

Muscogee is today spoken by fewer than 400 people, most of whom live in Oklahoma and are members of the Muscogee Nation and the Seminole Nation of Oklahoma. Some speakers of Muscogee are also members of the Seminole Tribe of Florida. The variety of Muscogee spoken by Seminoles in Oklahoma is sometimes referred to as "Seminole". Among Seminoles in Florida, Hitchiti-Mikasuki is the dominant language, however.

Muscogee belongs to a family of languages known as Muskogean. Muscogee is related to, but not mutually intelligible with, Choctaw, Chickasaw, Alabama, Koasati, Apalachee, and Hitchiti-Mikasuki.

== Dialects ==
The three main dialects of Muscogee are Muscogee proper (used in the Muscogee Nation), Oklahoma Seminole Muscogee, and Florida Seminole Muscogee. The most distinct dialect of the language is said to be that of the Florida Seminole, which is described as "rapid", "staccato" and "dental", with more loan words from Spanish and Mikasuki as opposed to English. Florida Seminole Muscogee is the most endangered variety of the Muscogee language.

Dialect differences
Muscogee proper	Oklahoma Seminole	
cufonwv	esropottv	needle
kvpe	’sokkoskv	soap

Claudio Saunt, writing about the language of the later 18th century, said that there were different feminine and masculine versions, which he also calls dialects, of the Muscogee language. Males "attach[ed] distinct endings to verbs", while females "accent[ed] different syllables". These forms, mentioned in the first (1860) grammar of the Muscogee language, persisted in the Hichiti, Muscogee proper, and Koasati languages at least into the first half of the 20th century.

== Current status ==
Muscogee is the primary heritage language of the Muscogee people. The Muscogee Nation offers free language classes and immersion camps to Muscogee children.

=== Language programs ===
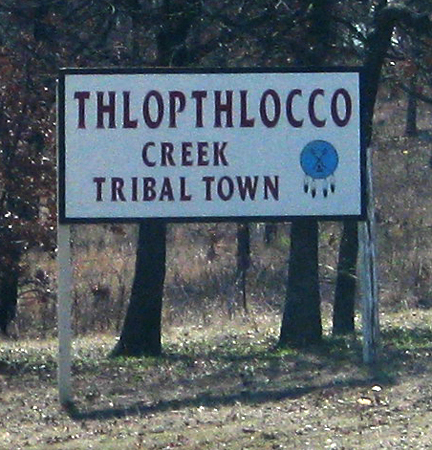

The College of the Muscogee Nation offers a language certificate program. Tulsa public schools, the University of Oklahoma and Glenpool Library in Tulsa and the Holdenville, Okmulgee, and Tulsa Muscogee Communities of the Muscogee Nation offer Muscogee Creek language classes. In 2013, the Sapulpa Creek Community Center graduated a class of 14 from its Muscogee language class. In 2018, 8 teachers graduated from a class put on by the Seminole nation at Seminole State College to try and reintroduce the Muscogee language to students in elementary and high school in several schools around the state.

== Phonology ==
The phoneme inventory of Muscogee consists of thirteen consonants and three vowel qualities, which distinguish length, tone and nasalization. It also makes use of the gemination of stops, fricatives and sonorants.

=== Consonants ===
Consonant phonemes of Muscogee
	Labial	Alveolar		Palatal	Velar	Glottal
	Labial	Median	Lateral	Palatal	Velar	Glottal
Nasal	m	n				
Plosive	p	t		tʃ	k	
Fricative	f	s	ɬ			h
Approximant	w		l	j		

==== Plosives ====
There are four voiceless stops in Muscogee: /p t t͡ʃ k/. /t͡ʃ/ is a voiceless palatal affricate and patterns as a single consonant and so with the other voiceless stops. /t͡ʃ/ has an alveolar allophone [t͡s] before /k/. The obstruent consonants /p t t͡ʃ k/ are voiced to [b d d͡ʒ ɡ] between sonorants and vowels but remain voiceless at the end of a syllable.

Between instances of [o], or after [o] at the end of a syllable, the velar /k/ is realized as the uvular [q] or [ɢ]. For example:

in-coko	'his or her house'	[ɪnd͡ʒʊɢo]
tokná:wa	'money'	[toqnɑːwə]

==== Fricatives ====
There are four voiceless fricatives in Muscogee: /f s ɬ h/. /f/ can be realized as either labiodental [f] or bilabial [ɸ] in place of articulation. Predominantly among speakers in Florida, the articulation of /s/ is more laminal, resulting in /s/ being realized as [ʃ], but for most speakers, /s/ is a voiceless apico-alveolar fricative [s].

Like /k/, the glottal /h/ is sometimes realized as the uvular [χ] when it is preceded by [o] or when syllable-final:

oh-leyk-itá	'chair'	[oχlejɡɪdə]
ohɬolopi:	'year'	[oχɬolobiː]

==== Sonorants ====
The sonorants in Muscogee are two nasals (/m/ and /n/), two semivowels (/w/ and /j/), and the lateral /l/, all voiced. Nasal assimilation occurs in Muscogee: /n/ becomes [ŋ] before /k/.

Sonorants are devoiced when followed by /h/ in the same syllable and results in a single voiceless consonant:

camhcá:ka	'bell'	[t͡ʃəm̥t͡ʃɑːɡə]
akcáwhko	'a type of water bird'	[ɑkt͡ʃəw̥ko]

==== Geminates ====
All plosives and fricatives in Muscogee can be geminated (lengthened). Some sonorants may also be geminated, but [hh] and [mm] are less common than other sonorant geminates, especially in roots. For the majority of speakers, except for those influenced by the Alabama or Koasati languages, the geminate [ww] does not occur.

=== Vowels ===
The vowel phonemes of Muscogee are as follows:

	Front	Central	Back
Close	i iː		
Close-mid			o oː
Open		ɑ ɑː	

There are three short vowels /i ɑ o/ and three long vowels /iː ɑː oː/. There are also the nasal vowels /ĩ ɑ̃ õ ĩː ɑ̃ː õː/ (in the linguistic orthography, they are often written with an ogonek under them or a following superscript "n"). Most occurrences of nasal vowels are the result of nasal assimilation or the nasalizing grade, but there are some forms that show contrast between oral and nasal vowels:

pó-ɬki	'our father'
opó^{n}ɬko	'cutworm'

==== Short vowels ====
The three short vowels /i ɑ o/ can be realized as the lax and centralized ([ɪ ə ʊ]) when a neighboring consonant is coronal or in closed syllables. However, /ɑ/ will generally not centralize when it is followed by /h/ or /k/ in the same syllable, and /o/ will generally remain noncentral if it is word-final. Initial vowels can be deleted in Muscogee, mostly applying to the vowel /i/. The deletion will affect the pitch of the following syllable by creating a higher-than-expected pitch on the new initial syllable. Furthermore, initial vowel deletion in the case of single-morpheme, short words such as ifa 'dog' or icó 'deer' is impossible, as the shortest a Muscogee word can be is a one-syllable word ending in a long vowel (fóː 'bee') or a two-syllable word ending with a short vowel (ací 'corn').

==== Long vowels ====
There are three long vowels in Muscogee (/iː ɑː oː/), which are slightly longer than short vowels and are never centralized.

Long vowels are rarely followed by a sonorant in the same syllable. Therefore, when syllables are created (often from suffixation or contractions) in which a long vowel is followed by a sonorant, the vowel is shortened:

in-ɬa:m-itá	'to uncover, open'
in-ɬam-k-itá	'to be uncovered, open'

==== Diphthongs ====
In Muscogee, there are three diphthongs, generally realized as [əɪ ʊj əʊ], phonemically may be /ɑi uj ɑo/.

==== Nasal vowels ====
Both long and short vowels can be nasalized (the distinction between acces and ącces below), but long nasal vowels are more common. Nasal vowels usually appear as a result of a contraction, as the result of a neighboring nasal consonant, or as the result of nasalizing grade, a grammatical ablaut, which indicates intensification through lengthening and nasalization of a vowel (likoth- 'warm' with the nasalizing grade intensifies the word to likŏ:^{n}th-os-i: 'nice and warm'). Nasal vowels may also appear as part of a suffix that indicates a question (o:sk-ihá:^{n} 'I wonder if it's raining').

==== Tones ====
There are three phonemic tones in Muscogee; they are generally unmarked except in the linguistic orthography: high (marked in the linguistic orthography with an acute accent: á, etc.), low (unmarked: a, etc.), and falling (marked with a circumflex: â, etc.).

== Orthography ==
The traditional Muscogee alphabet was adopted by many interpreters and chiefs as the "National Alphabet" in 1853 and has 20 letters.

Although it is based on the Latin alphabet, some sounds like c, e, i, r, and v differ from those in English. Here are the (approximately) equivalent sounds using familiar English words and the IPA:

Spelling	Sound (IPA)	English equivalent
a	aː ~ a	like the "a" in father
c	tʃ ~ ts	like the "ch" in such or the "ts" in cats
e	ɪ	like the "i" in hit
ē	iː	like the "ee" in seed
f	f	like the "f" in father
h	h	like the "h" in hatch
i	ɛj ~ ɛ:	like the "ay" in day
k	k	like the "k" in skim
l	l	like the "l" in look
m	m	like the "m" in moon
n	n	like the "n" in moon
o	oː ~ ʊ ~ o	like the "o" in bone or the "oo" in book
p	p	like the "p" in spot
r	ɬ	a sound that does not occur in English but is often represented as "hl" or "thl" in English spellings. The sound is made by blowing air around the sides of the tongue while pronouncing English l and is identical to Welsh ll.
s	s	like the "s" in spot
t	t	like the "t" in stop
u	ʊ ~ o	like the "oo" in book or the "oa" in boat
v	ə ~ a	like the "a" in about
w	w	like the "w" in wet
y	j	like the "y" in yet

There are also three vowel sequences whose spellings match their phonetic makeup:

Spelling	Sound (IPA)	English equivalent
eu	iʊ	similar to the exclamation "ew!". A combination of the sounds represented by e and u
ue	oɪ	like the "oy" in boy
vo	aʊ ~ əʊ	like the "ow" in how

=== Consonants ===
As mentioned above, certain consonants in Muscogee, when they appear between two sonorants (a vowel or m, n, l, w, or y), become voiced. They are the consonants represented by p, t, k, c, and s:

- c can sound like [dʒ], the "j" in just
- k can sound like [ɡ], the "g" in goat
- p can sound like [b], the "b" in boat
- s can sound like [z], the "z" in zoo
- t can sound like [d], the "d" in dust

=== Vowel length ===
While vowel length in Muscogee is distinctive, it is somewhat inconsistently indicated in the traditional spelling. The following basic correspondences can be noted:

- The short vowel v with the long vowel a (/a/ vs. /aː/)
- The short vowel e with the long vowel ē (/i/ vs. /iː/)
- The short vowel u with the long vowel o (/o/ vs. /oː/)

However, the correspondences do not always apply, and in some words, short /a/ is spelled a, long /iː/ is spelled e, and short /o/ is spelled o.

=== Nonstandard orthography ===
Muscogee words carry distinctive tones and nasalization of their vowels. These features are not usually marked in the traditional spelling, but may be indicated in dictionaries and linguistic publications. The following additional markers have been used by Martin (2000) and Innes (2004):

- Falling tone in a syllable is shown using a circumflex. In English, falling tone is found in phrases such as "uh-oh" or commands such as "stop!" In Muscogee, however, changing a verb such as acces ("she is putting on (a dress)") to âcces alters the meaning from one of process to one of state ("she is wearing (a dress)").
- Nasalization of a vowel is shown with an ogonek under the vowel. Changing the verb acces to ącces adds the imperfective aspect, a sense of repeated or habitual action ("she kept putting on (that same dress)").

== Grammar ==
Muscogee verbs are highly synthetic, with many prefixes, suffixes, and infixes showing the person, number, and location of participants as well as the tense, aspect, and mood of the sentence. Nouns have fewer affixes, but compounding is used extensively.

=== Word order ===
The basic order of elements in a sentence is subject–object–verb.

Basic order of subject, object, and verb
Efvt	pose	lvstēn	assēces.
ifá-t	pó:si	lást-i:-n	á:ssi:c-ís
dog-SUBJECT	cat	black-DURATIVE-NONSUBJECT	chase.LGR-INDICATIVE
The dog is chasing the black cat.

Subjects and objects are commonly omitted when they are clear from context, so that Assēces is complete as a sentence meaning ’he/she/it is chasing him/her/it’.

The subject and object are noun phrases having words in the following order: (possessor or demonstrative) — noun — (adjective) — (numeral). Adverbs tend to occur either at the beginning of the sentence (for time adverbs) or immediately before the verb (for manner adverbs). Muscogee uses postpositions instead of prepositions.

=== Case ===
Noun phrases may be marked with clitics indicating the role of noun phrases in a sentence. The basic distinction is between subjects (which may end in -t) and nonsubjects (which may end in -n). Nonsubjects include direct objects, indirect objects, times, and places. In some situations, case marking is omitted. This is especially true of sentences with only one noun where the role of the noun is obvious from the personal marking on the verb. Case marking is also omitted on fixed phrases that use a noun, e.g. "go to town" or "build a fire".

=== Possession ===
Possession in Muscogee is expressed in two quite different ways, depending on the nature of the relationship.

A body part or family member cannot be named in Muscogee without relating it to a possessor. A set of prefixes is used in this type of relation to show the person and number of the possessor.

Relational possession
cv-	cvpuse	/ca-pósi/	my grandmother
ce-	cepuse	/ci-pósi/	your grandmother
e-	epuse	/i-pósi/	his/her grandmother
pu-	pupuse	/po-pósi/	our grandmother

Nouns other than body parts and kinship terms are generally possessed with a different set of markers.

Nonrelational possession
vm	vm efv	/am-ífa/	my dog
cem	cem efv	/cim-ífa/	your dog
em	em efv	/im-ífa/	his/her dog
pum	pum efv	/pom-ífa/	our dog

=== Person marking ===
Muscogee has three series of person markers on verbs. The agent (type I) person markers generally show the person and number of subjects that perform an action on purpose. Agent person markers are suffixed to the verb root.

Agent person markers
-i	Hompis.	/homp-éy-s/	I am eating.
-etc	Hompetskes.	/homp-ítsk-is/	You are eating.
(no mark)	Hompes.	/homp-ís/	He/she/it is eating..
-ē	Hompēs.	/homp-í:-s/	We are eating.
-atc	Hompatskes.	/homp-á:tsk-is/	You all are eating.
-ak	Hompakes.	/homp-á:k-is/	They are eating.

The patient (type II) person markers often indicate the person and number of direct objects.

Patient person markers
cv-	Cvhēces.	/ca-hî:c-is/	He/she/it sees me.
ce-	Cehēces.	/ci-hî:c-is/	He/she/it sees you.
(no mark)	Hēces.	/hî:c-is/	He/she/it sees him/her.
pu-	Puhēces.	/po-hî:c-is/	He/she/it sees us.

A third series of dative (type D) person markers generally shows the person and number of the indirect object.

Dative person markers
vm	Vm opunayes.	/am-ópona:y-ís/	He/she is talking to me.
cem	Cem opunayes.	/cim-ópona:y-ís/	He/she is talking to you.
em	Em opunayes.	/im-ópona:y-ís/	He/she is talking to him/her.
pum	Pum opunayes.	/pom-ópona:y-ís/	He/she is talking to us.

=== Tenses ===
Verbs are listed in dictionaries in forms that end in -etv /-ita/. A verb like nesetv /nis-íta/ 'to buy' can appear in five past tense forms depending on how far back an event happened.

Tense forms of nesetv 'to buy'
Mvskoke		English	
nesetv	/nis-íta/	to buy	Infinitive
nēses	/ni:s-ís/	he/she is buying it	Present
nehses	/níhs-is/	he/she bought it (today)	Past 1
nēsvnks	/nî:s-ánk-s/	he/she bought it (recently)	Past 2
nēsemvts	/nî:s-imát-s	he/she bought it (about a year ago)	Past 3
nēsvntvs	/nî:s-anta-s	he/she bought (long ago)	Past 4
nēsvtēs	/ni:s-atí:-s	he/she bought (very long ago)	Past 5
nesvrēs	/nis-áɬi:-s	he/she will buy it	Future

=== Other categories ===
Muscogee has suffixes at the ends of sentences indicating the functions of sentences. Statements end in -(e)s, questions seeking a yes or no answer end in -v, and singular commands end in -vs.

Mood forms of nesetv 'to buy'
Mvskoke		English	
nēses	/ni:s-ís/	he/she is buying it	statement
nēsv?	/ni:s-a/	is he/she buying it?	question
nesvs!	/nis-ás/	buy it!	command

Like other Muskogean languages, Muscogee has a system of ablaut or "grades" that indicate distinctions in grammatical aspect.

Grade forms of wvnvyetv 'to tie'
Mvskoke		English	
wvnvyetv	/wanay-itá/	to tie	infinitive
wvnvyvs	/wanáy-as/	tie it!	zero grade
wvnayes	/wana:y-ís/	he/she is tying it	lengthened grade
wvnahyes	/wanáhy-is/	he/she tied it (today/last night)	aspirating grade
wvnayes	/wanâ:y-is/	he/she has tied it	falling tone grade
wvnąyes	/wanǎ:ⁿy-is/	he/she keeps tying it	nasalizing grade

Verbs in Muscogee sometimes have different forms when their subjects or objects are plural. Verbs like this generally describe position or motion.

Plural forms of verbs
singular subject	dual subject	triplural subject	
vretv	welvketv	fulletv	to go about
hueretv	sehoketv	svpakletv	to stand
letketv	tokorketv	pefatketv	to run
wakketv	wakhoketv	lomhetv	to lie

== Vocabulary ==
Common expressions
Mvskoke	English
Mvto!	Thank you!
Estonko!	How are you!
Hompvks cē!	Y’all eat!
Enka!	Okay!
Cehecarēs!	I’ll see you!

Family
Mvskoke	English
erke	father
ecke	mother
pvwv	maternal uncle
erkuce	paternal uncle
eckuce	maternal aunt
puca	grandfather
puse	grandmother, paternal aunt

Numbers
Mvskoke	English
hvmken	one
hokkolen	two
tuccēnen	three
osten	four
cahkēpen	five
ēpaken	six
kolvpaken	seven
cenvpaken	eight
ostvpaken	nine
palen	ten

Months
Mvskoke	English
Rvfo ’Cuse	January
Hotvlē-Hvse	February
Tasahcuce	March
Tasahce-Rakko	April
Kē-Hvse	May
Kvco-Hvse	June
Hvyuce	July
Hvyo-Rakko	August
Otvwoskuce	September
Otvwoskv-Rakko	October
Eholē	November
Rvfo-Rakko	December

== See also ==
- Muscogee people
- Creek mythology
- Muskogean languages
- Mikasuki language
