= Oklahoma Indian Welfare Act =

United States federal law

- Long title: An Act to promote the general welfare of the Indians of the State of Oklahoma, and for other purposes.
- Nicknames: Oklahoma Indian Bill
- Enacted by: the 74th United States Congress
- Effective: June 26, 1936

Citations
- Public law: 74-816
- Statutes at Large: 49 Stat. 1967

Codification
- Titles amended: 25 U.S.C.: Indians
- U.S.C. sections created: 25 U.S.C. ch. 14, subch. VIII § 501 et seq.

Legislative history
- Introduced in the Senate as S. 2047 by Elmer Thomas (D-OK) on August 12, 1935; Committee consideration by Senate Indian Affairs, House Indian Affairs; Passed the Senate on August 16, 1935 (passed); Passed the House on June 15, 1936 (passed) with amendment; Senate agreed to House amendment on June 18, 1936 (agreed); Signed into law by President Franklin D. Roosevelt on June 26, 1936

The Oklahoma Indian Welfare Act of 1936 (also known as the Thomas-Rogers Act) is a United States federal law that extended the 1934 Wheeler-Howard or Indian Reorganization Act to include those tribes within the boundaries of the state of Oklahoma. The purpose of these acts were to rebuild Indian tribal societies, return land to the tribes, enable tribes to rebuild their governments, and emphasize Native culture. These Acts were developed by John Collier, Commissioner of Indian Affairs from 1933 to 1945, who wanted to change federal Indian policy from the "twin evils" of allotment and assimilation, and support Indian self-government.

The Thomas-Rogers Act was adopted in order to enable Native American tribes in Oklahoma to rebuild governments that had been dissolved in order to prepare the territories for Oklahoma being admitted as a state in the Union in 1907. As part of this effort also to encourage Native American assimilation, Indian land title was extinguished in Indian Territory by the break-up and allotment of communal lands. Under the Dawes and Curtis acts, the communal land of the former reservations in Oklahoma was:

- allotted to individual Indian Tribal members with 160 acres per household (too little in many areas to support subsistence farming because of poor conditions)
- held in trust by the United States for the benefit of tribal members.
- What the government determined to be "surplus" was sold off or otherwise distributed, including to non-Natives, in a series of land runs.

In addition to surplus lands being sold, many Native Americans lost their allotments to speculators and unscrupulous businessmen. The Native Americans suffered major losses of land in Oklahoma. In addition, the disruption of their societies and cultures resulted in considerable breakdown of their worlds.

== Major points of the act ==
- United States Secretary of the Interior is authorized to obtain good agricultural and grazing lands (including Indian lands) to be held in trust for the Indians.
- Land held by the United States is free from any and all taxes except Oklahoma Gross Production Tax from oil and gas produced from the land.
- Where Indian lands are sold, the Secretary of the Interior shall show preference to obtain those lands for the use by Native Americans.
- Any recognized tribe residing within Oklahoma may receive a charter of incorporation from the Secretary of Interior, and shall have the right to self-determination, including the right to make their own bylaws.
- Any group of 10 Tribal Members may receive a Charter of Cooperative Association (for specific purposes) from the Secretary of Interior; laws of the State of Oklahoma govern for those issues not covered by federal law or regulations issued by the Secretary.
- Act does not relate to Osage County, Oklahoma (does not affect the Osage Nation, which retained ownership of its own land)

As issues arose, Department of Interior officials sought the opinion of its Solicitor General about the effects of this legislation. This correspondence is part of the agency records. As the Five Civilized Tribes began to reorganize and set up new governments, the question arose as to whether they could change their membership rules, specifically, to exclude the Freedmen. Each of the tribes had been required under terms of new 1866 treaties to extend citizenship to their Freedmen. In 1941, the Solicitor General noted that Congress had approved the law that enabled tribes to reconstitute their governments and, by extension, enabled them to create new constitutions and rules. It said that the tribes could pass new constitutions with new membership rules that limited membership to persons of Indian descent. While some of the tribes resisted providing Freedmen with full tribal benefits, they did not generally take action to exclude them as members until the late 20th century, at a time of increasing assertion of tribal sovereignty. Freedmen descendants have filed suit against the Cherokee and Creek tribes over such exclusion.

== See also ==
- Former Indian Reservations in Oklahoma
