= Alabama language =

Muskogean language spoken in Texas, US

Alabama
- Albaamo innaaɬiilka
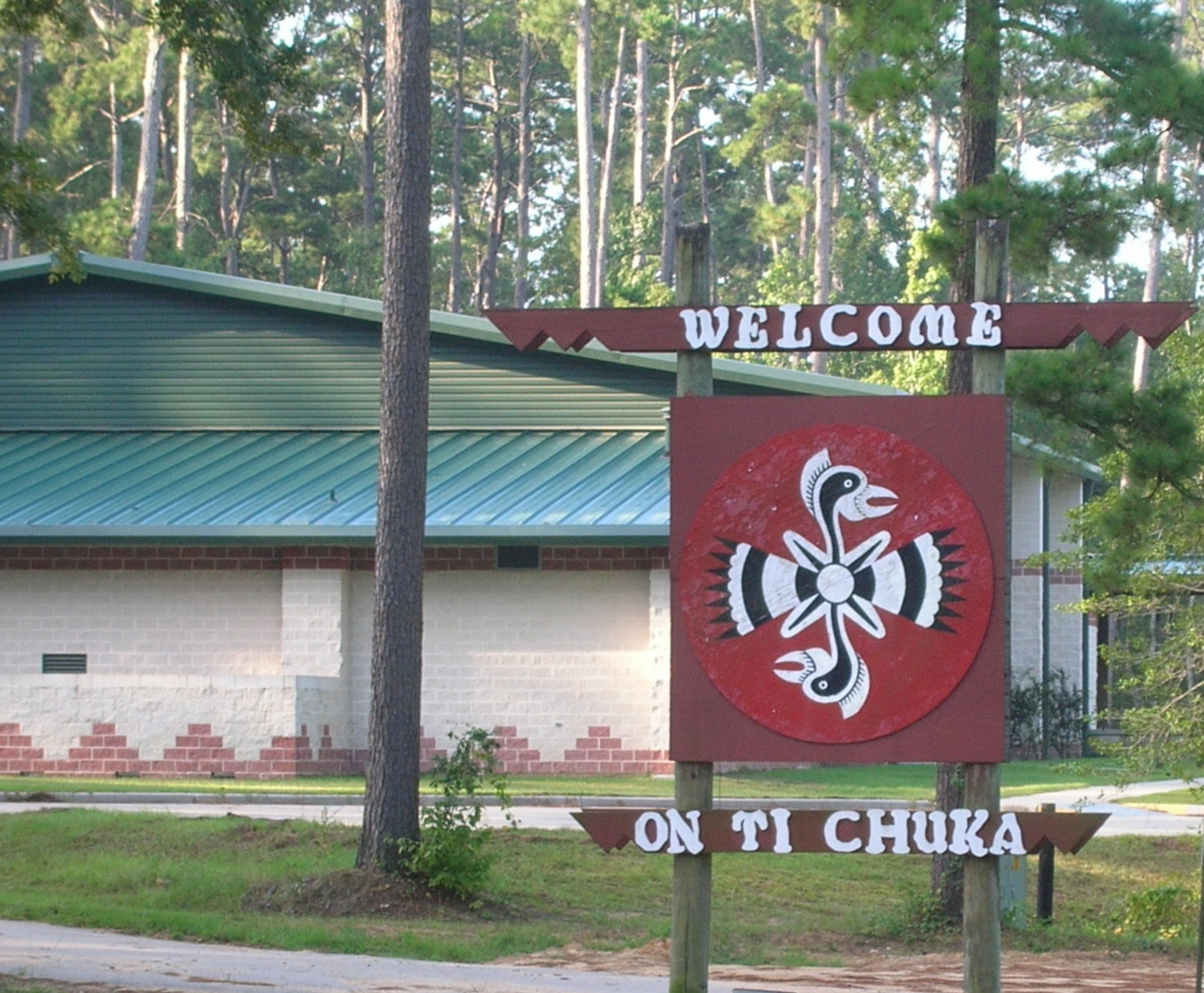
- Sign on the Alabama–Coushatta Indian Reservation with phrase On ti chuka meaning 'welcome'
- Native to: United States
- Region: Currently in Texas, Formerly in Oklahoma and Alabama
- Ethnicity: Alabama
- Native speakers: approx. 370 (2015 census)
- Language family: Muskogean: Eastern; Alabama–Koasati; Alabama

Language codes
- ISO 639-3: akz
- Glottolog: alab1237
- ELP: Alabama
- Alabama is classified as Definitely Endangered by the UNESCO Atlas of the World's Languages in Danger.

Alabama, also known as Alibamu, (endonym: Albaamo innaaɬiilka) is a Muskogean language, spoken by the Alabama–Coushatta Tribe of Texas. It was once spoken by the Alabama–Quassarte Tribal Town of Oklahoma, but there are no more Alabama speakers in Oklahoma. It is believed to have been closely related to the Muklasa and Tuskegee languages, which are now extinct. Alabama is closely related to Koasati and Apalachee, and more distantly to other Muskogean languages like Hitchiti, Chickasaw and Choctaw.

== History ==
The Alabama first encountered Europeans when Hernando de Soto arrived in 1540. (See here for other de Soto contactees) In the 18th century, the French arrived on the Gulf Coast and built a fort at what became Mobile, Alabama.

The Alibamu and Koasati tribes were part of the Creek Confederacy. They had less contact with British settlers than other Creek tribes did. They were the first to leave when British settlers swarmed into the area by the middle of the 18th century, after the land was ceded by the French following the British victory in the French and Indian War. Under pressure as well by Native American enemies, the Alabama and Coushatta tribes wanted to avoid the powerful Choctaw in present-day Mississippi. They moved into territories of future states, first into Louisiana and then into Texas.

In 1795, the Coushatta arrived in the Big Thicket area of East Texas. In 1805, nearly 1,000 Alabama came to Tyler County's Peach Tree Village in East Texas. The two tribes developed a strong friendship as they roamed and hunted their new land together. In the early 19th century, the Texas Congress granted each tribe two strips of land along the Trinity River. Their land was soon taken over by European-American settlers, leaving them homeless. Sam Houston, the governor of Texas, recommended that the state purchase 1,280 acres (5.2 km^{2}) for the Alabamas. Although money was appropriated to buy 640 acres (2.6 km^{2}) for the Coushatta, the land was never bought. Either through marriage or special permission, many Coushatta went to live on the land given to the Alabama. Other Coushatta had stayed in an area in southern Louisiana near the Red River. Many of their descendants are enrolled members of the federally recognized Coushatta Tribe of Louisiana.

Alabama and Coushatta towns were divided into "red" and "white" towns. The "white" towns were responsible for keeping the peace and for providing refuge, while the "red" towns were responsible for conducting military campaigns. Though they had "red" and "white" towns, the Alabama–Coushatta thought of themselves as a peace-loving people.

By 1820, there were three main Alabama towns and three large Coushatta towns in east Texas, in the region known as the Big Thicket. In 1854, the Alabama were given 1,280 acres (5.2 km^{2}) in Polk County. The following year, 640 acres (2.6 km^{2}), also in Polk County, were given to the Coushattas. The Coushatta claim was disputed by white settlers in 1859. When the Coushatta lost the land claim, the Alabama invited them to live on their land claim.

The federal government approved a large grant in 1928 to purchase additional land near the reservation; it was granted to the "Alabama and Coushatta tribes." Since that time, the reservation has officially been known as Alabama–Coushatta.

Origin narratives focus on the interconnectedness of the tribes. One narrative states that the two tribes sprouted from either side of a cypress tree. Another legend was recorded in 1857 from Se-ko-pe-chi, one of the oldest Creeks in Indian Territory. He said that the tribes "sprang out of the ground between the Cohawba and Alabama Rivers." The symbol of the Alabama–Coushatta tribe comes from pre-contact Mississippian culture: two intertwined woodpeckers, now symbolic of the connection between the two tribes.

== Phonology ==
=== Consonants ===
There are fourteen consonant phonemes in Alabama.

| | Labial | | Alveolar | | Postalveolar/ Palatal | Velar | Glottal |
|---|---|---|---|---|---|---|---|
| Nasal | m | | n | | | | |
| Stop | p | b | t | | tʃ | k | |
| Fricative | f | | s | ɬ | | | h |
| Approximant | w | | l | | j | | |

/s/ is apico-alveolar, [s̺]. The voiceless stops /p t k/ are typically fortis and unlike in many other Southeastern languages they are not voiced between vowels. All consonants can occur geminated. The post-alveolar affricate /tʃ/ is realized as [s] when it occurs as the first member of a consonant cluster and the geminate is realized as [ttʃ]. The only voiced obstruent in Alabama is /b/, which is realized as [m] when it occurs in coda (syllable final) position. The geminate /bb/ is realized as [mb]. The two nasal phonemes become velar [ŋ] before the velar stop /k/. In syllable-final position, /h/ is often realized as lengthening of the preceding vowel.

=== Vowels ===
There are three vowel qualities, /i o a/. Vowel length is distinctive. Vowels can be nasalized in certain morphological contexts.

=== Prosody ===
In Alabama, the final syllable generally carries the primary stress, except in the case of certain grammatical operations which move the stress. There is also a pitch accent system with two contrastive tones: high-level and high-falling. The two phonemic tones have several different allophonic realizations depending on vowel length and neighboring consonants.

== Revitalization efforts ==
Since January 2024, the Alabama–Coushatta Tribe of Texas has engaged in a revitalization and documentation effort in partnership with the WOLF (Working on Language in the Field) Lab at Harvard University, with a five-year goal "to document the language, study its grammar and lexicon, and produce educational resources for the Alabama–Coushatta community."

== Sources ==
- Brennan, Maeve (March 2, 2024). "'I Want People to Know It': Ava E. Silva '27 Works to Preserve the Alabama Language". The Harvard Crimson.
- Davis, Philip; Hardy, Heather (1988). "Absence of noun marking in Alabama". International Journal of American Linguistics. 54 (3): 279–308. doi:10.1086/466087. S2CID 145397345.
- Hardy, Heather K. (2005). "Alabama". In Hardy, Heather K.; Scancarelli, Janine (eds.). Native Languages of the Southeastern United States. Lincoln: University of Nebraska Press. pp. 75–113. ISBN 0-8032-4235-2.
- Hardy, Heather; Davis, Philip (1988). "Comparatives in Alabama". International Journal of American Linguistics. 54 (2): 209–231. doi:10.1086/466082. S2CID 144076045.
- Hardy, Heather; Davis, Philip (1993). "Semantics of agreement in Alabama". International Journal of American Linguistics. 59 (4): 453–472. doi:10.1086/466214. S2CID 145425590.
- Hardy, Heather; Montler, Timothy (1988). "Imperfective gemination in Alabama". International Journal of American Linguistics. 54 (4): 399–415. doi:10.1086/466094. S2CID 144053231.
- Montler, Timothy; Hardy, Heather (1991). "Phonology of negation in Alabama". International Journal of American Linguistics. 57 (1): 1–23. doi:10.1086/ijal.57.1.3519711. S2CID 147850761.
- Rand, Earl (1968). "Structural phonology of Alabaman, a Muskogean language". International Journal of American Linguistics. 34 (2): 94–103. doi:10.1086/465002. S2CID 145333066.
- Sylestine, Cora; Hardy, Heather; Montler, Timothy (1993). Dictionary of the Alabama Language. Austin: University of Texas Press. ISBN 0-292-73077-2. Archived from the original on February 6, 2005.
