= Koasati language =

Muskogean language of Louisiana

Koasati
- Kowassá꞉ti
- Native to: United States
- Region: Elton, Louisiana and Livingston, Texas
- Ethnicity: Koasati people
- Native speakers: (c. 370 cited 263 census)
- Language family: Muskogean: Eastern; Alabama–Koasati; Koasati

Language codes
- ISO 639-3: cku
- Glottolog: koas1236
- ELP: Koasati
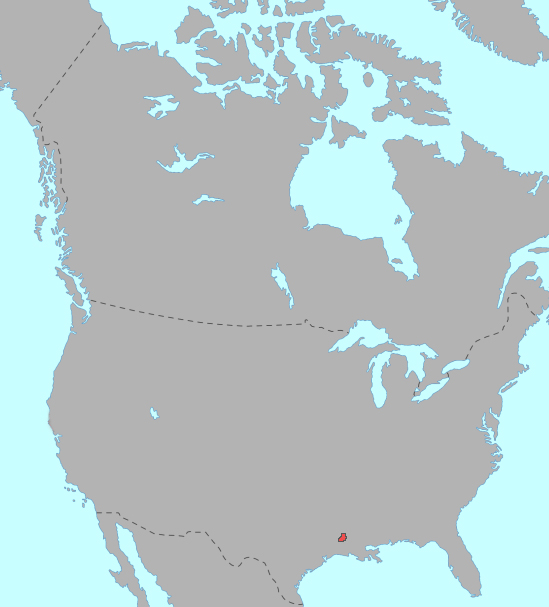

- Koasati is classified as Definitely Endangered by the UNESCO Atlas of the World's Languages in Danger.

Koasati (also Coushatta) is a Native American language of Muskogean origin. The language is spoken by the Coushatta people, most of whom live in Allen Parish north of the town of Elton, Louisiana, though a smaller number share a reservation near Livingston, Texas, with the Alabama people. In 1991, linguist Geoffrey Kimball estimated the number of speakers of the language at around 400 people, of whom approximately 350 live in Louisiana. The exact number of current speakers is unclear, but Coushatta Tribe officials claim that most tribe members over 20 speak Koasati. In 2007, the Coushatta Tribe of Louisiana, in collaboration with McNeese State University and the College of William and Mary, began the Koasati (Coushatta) Language Project as a part of broader language revitalization efforts with National Science Foundation grant money under the Documenting Endangered Languages program.

Koasati is most closely related to the Alabama language but, though the Coushatta and Alabama have historically lived near each other, their languages are no longer mutually intelligible without extensive exposure. The language is also related to the Mikasuki language; some native speakers of Coushatta report they can understand Mikasuki without previous exposure to the language.

== Phonology ==
=== Vowels ===
Koasati has three vowels, all of which occur as short and long and can be nasalized. The following chart is based on Kimball's work. Kimball describes what is normally the close-mid back vowel /o/ as "high back" vowel, hence its placement in the chart below. He notes that /o/ sometimes has the allophone [u] and is raised to [ʊ] in closed word-final syllables.

	Short			Long		
	Front	Central	Back	Front	Central	Back
High (close)	i		o	iː		oː
Low (open)		a			aː	

In 2007, the Coushatta Tribe of Louisiana developed and approved its own orthographic system. In this system, long vowels are written by doubling the vowel (e.g., [aː] as aa), and nasalized vowels are underlined (e.g., [õ] or [ǫ] as o̱).

Vowel length in Koasati can be contrastive. For example, vowel length distinguishes meaning for palana "bean" and palaana "plate", as well as choba "big" and chooba "horse". Vowel nasalization most often occurs word-finally as a phrase-terminal marker. In Koasati, the end of a phrase is basically marked by either deletion of the final unaccented vowel or the nasalization of the final vowel when deleting it would eliminate phonological information relevant to the phrase's meaning. For example, the final vowel in hopoonilaho̱ "he/she will cook it" is nasalized instead of deleted, and therefore is distinguished from the more emphatic hopoonilaha̱, where the irrealis future suffix -laha- indicates that the action will certainly occur, whereas the irrealis future suffix -laho- does not provide such certainty.

=== Consonants ===
Koasati has the consonants given in the table below, based on Geoffrey Kimball's work. IPA transcriptions occur in brackets when different from the orthography provided by Kimball.

		Labial	Dental	Palato-alveolar	Velar	Glottal
Stop	plain	p [pʰ]	t [tʰ]	c [t͡ʃʰ]	k [kʰ]	ʼ [ʔ]
Stop	voiced	b				
Fricative	plain	f [ɸ]	th [ɬ]	s		h [h]
Fricative	voiced					h [ɦ]
Nasal		m	n			
Lateral			l			
Glide		w		y [j]		

Not included in this chart is a glottal glide (marked ꞉) that Kimball uses in his own consonant chart, presumably to represent the lengthened vowel sounds of Koasati. In the Tribe's official orthography, the [ɬ] is represented by ⟨th⟩ and the [t͡ʃ] is represented by ⟨ch⟩, with no distinction for aspiration. Additionally, Kimball notes that /p/, /t/, and /k/ are aspirated in initial and medial positions. However, the website for the Koasati Language Project explicitly states that these consonants are never aspirated. The [ɦ] occurs most often before [t͡ʃ], as in [haɦt͡ʃí] "river", spelled ⟨hahchi⟩ in the official orthography, thereby distinguished from ⟨hachi⟩ "tail".

=== Syllable structure ===
Koasati has both light (CV, VC, V) and heavy (CVC) syllables. Consonant clusters occur across syllables but not within. All monomorphemic Koasati words end in light syllables, while the penultimate syllable can be light but is usually heavy, and it is usually preceded by one or more light syllables, as with the construction CV.CVC.CV as in the word holihtá "fence". Other shapes, in which one or more heavy syllables precede a heavy penultimate syllable (e.g. CV.CVC.CVC.CV as in hacokpalpá "butterfly"), or alternate heavy and light syllables (e.g. CVC.CV.CVC.CV. as in pa꞉piyá꞉ka "bridge"), are usually the result of the compounding of two words or a once-productive rule of syncope in which the vowel of every second syllable except the final syllable was deleted. Vowel clusters occur in Koasati, unlike in other Muskogean languages where such clusters are made impossible by metathesis and vowel deletion. These clusters occur in Koasati due to the use of locative prefixes that end in a vowel and class 1A negative transitive verbs since these do not undergo the processes of metathesis and vowel deletion. Clusters beginning with /a꞉/ and /i꞉/ are most frequent, and all clusters are generally spoken with a glottal stop between vowels.

=== Tone ===
Koasati has low [ ` ], high [ ´ ], and high rising–falling [ ˇ ] pitch accents, as well as a fourth unmarked mid-level tone. All noun roots must have one high-pitch accented syllable. The location of the accent depends on the properties of the penultimate syllable. With a few exceptions, the accent falls on the final syllable unless the penultimate syllable contains a long vowel. These pitch accents can be contrastive, as with sakihpǫ́ 'It is a mink.' and sakíhpǫ 'It is not air-dried.'. Pitch placement on verbs is motivated by morphology. Most indicative verbs take the high accent, though a few take the low accent. Intensive verbs take the high rising–falling accent.

=== Phonological processes ===
- /c/ in Kimball's orthography, or /ch/ in the official Tribe orthography, is sometimes realized as [ts] before resonants: cf. awó yáhci "it is just like grandpa" is realized as [awó yahtsi].
- In rare cases, /k/ is labialized to [kʷ] before /o/: cf. akkó "that" → [akkʷó]
- /s/ has the palatal allophone [š] word-initially before /o/ and intervocalically: cf. sopátlit "she cleaned it" → [šopátlit]
- When /s/ occurs both before and after a vowel, the allophone of the first /s/ harmonizes with that of the second. For example, sóslit ('he skinned them') is not pronounced [šoslit] but [sóslit].
- Rarely, /s/ can have the allophone [r] when it occurs word-finally: cf. o꞉támmo꞉s "it is just sunset" → [o꞉támmo꞉r]
- In the word-final position, /h/ becomes a voiceless continuation of the vowel it follows. This can also occur following vowels in other positions. For example, iltóhnot "she worked" becomes [iltóónot].
- /h/ can be voiced to [ɦ], usually before c, as discussed above with [haɦchi].
- /l/ is sometimes realized as /n/, as with intolihná "work" → [iltolihná]. Rarely, it is realized as [r] intervocalically.
- The vowel /i/ shifts to [ɪ] in all closed syllables, and /o/ shifts to [ʊ] when it occurs in closed word-final syllables: cf. hókfit "she put it on" → [hókfɪt]; íkbot "he did not kill it" → [íkbʊt]
- The vowels /i/ and /o/ also rarely have the allophones [ɛ] and [u] respectively, though the underlying reason is unclear: cf. yilahá "orange (fruit)" → [yɛlahá]; solitá꞉wa "soldier" → [sulitá꞉wa]

== Morphology ==
Koasati is a polysynthetic language with fairly extensive verbal prefixing and suffixing.

=== Nouns ===
Two sets of prefixes mark noun possession in Koasati. The am-set generally identifies alienable possession and a relatively small set of kinship terms and body parts, while the ca-set identifies inalienable possession and most kinship terms and body parts. These prefixes mark person and number on possessing nouns as follows:

	am-set	ca-set	Gloss
1st person (sing.)	am-	ca-	"my"
2nd person (sing.)	cim-	ci-	"your"
3rd person	im-		"his/her/its/their"
1st person (plur.)	kom-	ko-	"our"
2nd person (plur.)	hacim-	haci-	"your"

=== Verbs ===
==== Position classes ====
Kimball identifies the following position classes for prefixes and suffixes that can be added to Koasati verb roots:

- Prefixes
  - Position 1: positive and negative subject prefixes
  - Position 2: locative prefix a-, or the prefix ak- which indicates action on the surface of a person (skin) or thing
  - Position 3: locative prefixes
  - Position 4: pronominal prefixes (ca-)
  - Position 5: pronominal prefixes (am-)
  - Position 6: distributive prefix ho-/oh-, iterative prefix hoho-/ohoh-
  - Position 7: instrumental prefixes
  - Position 8: directional prefixes
  - Position 9: indefinite nouns na꞉si-/na꞉s-/nas- ('something') and a꞉ti-/a꞉t-/at-/a- ('someone')
- Root
- Suffixes
  - Position 1: adverb
  - Position 2: diminutive/intensive
  - Position 3: habitual
  - Position 4: intention
  - Position 5: ability
  - Position 6: realis/irrealis
  - Position 7: deduction
  - Position 8: modality
  - Position 9: dubiative
  - Position 10: hearsay
  - Position 11: auditory
  - Position 12: tense
  - Position 13: consequence
  - Position 14: discourse functions
  - Position 15: enclitics

===== Prefixes =====
Unlike its frequently used cognates in other Muskogean languages, the general locative prefix a- (Position 2) is falling out of use. Positions 4 and 5 relate to the am- and ca- sets discussed above with nouns. They contain the direct and indirect object prefixes respectively and are used to cross-reference the direct and indirect objects of verbs, as well as mark possession on nominalized verbs. For example, the Position 5 prefix ac- is used to mark possession on the root of the nominalized verb meaning "to photograph" in the following way:

st- ac- ahó꞉ba
INSTR- 1SG.POSS- photograph
"my photograph" ("a photograph of me")

A sampling of verbal prefixes, in this case, specific locative prefixes of Position 3, follows:

- itta- "action on the ground; action in fire"
- o꞉-/o꞉w- "action in water"
- pa꞉- "action on a raised, artificial, or non-ground surface"
- on- "action on a vertical surface or in a vertical plane"
- itta- "action in the middle of something"
- ibi꞉- "action on the human face"
- ico꞉- "action on or in the human mouth"
- no꞉- "action on the human neck"
- nok- "action in the human throat"

===== Suffixes =====
Kimball recorded over seventy suffixes to fill the fifteen suffix positions. All but eleven of these suffixes can technically co-occur with all other suffixes that do not occupy the same position class. Kimball provides the following example as a possibility:

o-st-oh-im-ilá-꞉ci-halpí꞉sa-laho-꞉li-má꞉mi-mpa-y-on im-ca-yím-ko-˛
go:&-INSTR-DISTR-3.DAT-arrive-PL-ABIL-IRR-DEDUC-HSY-CNSQ-SW:FOC 3.STAT.OBJ-1SG.STAT-believe-3.NEG(1A)-PHR:TERM
"They say that they all might be able to go and bring it to him, but on the contrary, I do not believe them."

In the first word, all units that follow the root -ilá- "arrive" are suffixes filling the various position classes.

A sample of suffixes, in this case, Position 5 suffixes of ability, follows:

- -bá꞉no- "regularly, occasionally"
- -bí꞉no- "reluctantly, shyly"
- -halpi꞉sa- "to be able to"
- -yáhli- "be obliged to, really"

Kimball notes that of these, only -halpi꞉sa- "to be able to" is used frequently.

==== Verbal number ====
Muskogean languages such as Koasati have a three-way number distinction in their verbs, with singular, dual, and plural forms. Some of these forms are suppletive. For example,

'To dwell', in the first person, with full suppletion (singular aat, dual asw, plural is):

áata-l
dwell(SG)-1SG
'I dwell'

a⟩lí⟨sw
dwell(DU)⟩1DU⟨(ROOT)
'we two dwell'

ís-tílka
dwell(PL)-1PL
'we all dwell'

(The angle braces, ⟩ ⟨, separate the two parts of the root.)

'To smell' is non-suppletive hofn:

hófna-l
smell-1SG
'I smell'

ho⟩lí⟨fn
smell⟩1DU⟨(ROOT)
'we smell'

'To go about', partially suppletive (SG/DU aay, PL yomahl):

aaya-l
go.about(SG/DU)-1SG
'I go about'

a⟩lí⟨iy
go.about(SG/DU)⟩1DU⟨(ROOT)
'we two go about'

yomah-híl
go.about(PL)-1PL
'we-all go about'

'To run', partially suppletive (SG waliik, DU/PL tołk):

walíika-l
run(SG)-1SG
'I run'

tół-hílk
run(DU/PL)-1PL
'we run'

==== Verb grades ====
Like other Muskogean languages, Koasati has verb grades, or an ablaut system in which morphological and phonemic changes (in this case infixation and nasalization) can be used to alter the meaning of verb.

===== H-grade =====
In Koasati, the h-grade is used to create a polite imperative as well as to indicate a sequence of actions. To form the imperative, h is inserted before the final syllable of the verb root. For example, the verb óntin "to come" (singular, dual subject) changes to the imperative ónhtįh "Come on over!" with the h-grade (in addition to the delayed imperative suffix marked by the vowel nasalization and final h). The use of h-grade to indicate sequence (in addition to the switch-reference marker -ok) can be seen below:

kowí-k icó í <h> b-ok on-a-í꞉pa-toho-˛
panther-SUBJ deer kill <h:grade> -SS:FOC LOC-GEN:LOC-eat-REAL-PHR:TERM
"The panther, having killed the deer, ate off of it."

With the sequence h-grade, the last verb in the sequence takes on temporal and aspectual affixes, while the preceding verbs take on the h-grade and the appropriate switch-reference marker.

===== N-grade =====
In Koasati, the n-grade is relatively uncommon but is used to add emphasis, roughly meaning "completely" or "to continue" depending on whether the verb used is a verb of state or description or a verb of action. To form the n-grade, the vowel of the verb root's penultimate syllable is nasalized and accented. For example:

olfá-k waló <N> hl-o꞉siV´hco-k
sprout green:&:tender <n:grade> -DIM-HAB-SS
"The sprout is completely green and tender."

==== Reduplication ====
Koasati has both punctual and iterative reduplication for verbs, in which part of the root is repeated to indicate that an action is repeated. With punctual reduplication, the verb's initial consonant and vowel (or consonant and o if no vowel is present) are copied and inserted before the final syllable of the root. For example, míslin "to blink" becomes mismíhlin "to flutter the eyelids". With iterative reduplication, the consonant and vowel of the penultimate syllable of the root are copied and inserted before the final syllable of the root. For example, molápkan "to gleam" becomes molalápkan "to flash". The iterative can also be formed using the Position 6 iterative prefixes ohoh- and hoho-.

==== The glottal stop ====
The glottal stop [ʔ] is used to form the interrogative by infixing [ʔ] before a verb's penultimate syllable. Doing so replaces preceding vowel length (if present) and adds a high pitch accent to the syllables preceding and following the glottal stop. For example, /ishí꞉c/ "you see it" changes to the question /ishíʔcá/ "Do you see it?".

== Syntax ==
=== Word order ===
Koasati sentences generally follow a subject, object, verb (SOV) pattern. If an indirect object is present, the order is typically subject, indirect object, verb (SIoV). For sentences with both a direct and indirect object, the order is typically subject, object, verb, indirect object (SOVIo), though SIoOV also occurs. Any locatives tend to follow the verb. Because Koasati uses the nominative case, these orders are not rigid - elements can be moved within the sentence for emphasis. Examples of some basic orders follow:

- SOV

stilapíli -k pokkó im- apí꞉li -to -˛
leader -SUBJ ball 3.DAT- throw(SG) -III.PAST -PHR:TERM
"The leader threw the ball to them underhand."

- SOVIo

á꞉t -ok if -ón ínka -t wílfrid -ka ocó꞉si
person -SUBJ:FOC dog -OBJ:FOC give:to:him -PAST Wilfred -LOAN son
"Someone gave a dog to Wilfred's son."

=== Case marking ===
Koasati is an active–stative language. It has seven cases that can be used across five classes of nouns:

Case	Noun classes	Marking on noun
nominative	I, II, III, IV, V	-k
accusative	I, II, III, IV, V	-n
autonomous	I, II, III, IV, V	none
locative	I, II, III, V	-fa
allative	II, III	-fon
inessive	III, IV	-hayo
vocative	V	final vowel deletion

The five noun classes contain the following types of nouns, followed by examples:

- Class I: nouns for animate objects (ifá, "dog")
- Class II: nouns to or in which action can occur (ó꞉la, "town")
- Class III: nouns within or among which action can occur (í꞉sa, "house")
- Class IV: nouns describing an area where action can occur (caffá, "field")
- Class V: personal names, kinship terms (awó, "grandfather")

=== Switch-reference ===
Koasati has switch-reference marking, in which suffixes indicate whether the subjects of two verbs are co-referent. The suffix –k indicates that the subject of the verb that follows is the same as that of the previous verb, while –n indicates that the subject is different than that of the previous verb. The suffixes –ok and –on can also be used in the same way for extra emphasis or "focus". The switch-reference marker –p indicates the introduction of a new topic. An example of each suffix follows:

- nó꞉ra-k ɫabósli-h bánna-k hí꞉ca-t á꞉ta-toho-꞉li-k akkámmi-tik labósl-á꞉ha-k sam, kí,꞉c-o-t — "Nora tried to extinguish it, and she kept on watching it, but this being so, she was unable to extinguish it."
- athómma-k yomáhli-n calakkí ho-ká꞉ha-hco-k — "They called the wandering Indians Cherokees."
- skólka im-alo, kí, st-o-n mí꞉ta-k im-alósti-tika-p — "They were not interested in school; however, others were interested in it."
