= Code of honor =

Set of conduct rules

A code of honor or honor code is generally a set of rules or ideals, or a mode or way of behaving, regarding honor that is socially, institutionally, culturally, individually or personally imposed; and is reinforced, followed, or respected by certain individuals or certain cultures or societies. Codes of honor frequently concern (often subjective) ethical or moral considerations or cultural or individual values and are commonly found in certain honor cultures or within the context of cultures, societies, or situations that place importance on honor.

The term may specifically refer to:

- An academic honor code
- modes of thinking or conduct acceptable within an honor culture and/or concerning honor
- a certain code of conduct involving honor
- various specific honor-based codes, such as omertà, chivalry, various codes of silence, the code duello, the Bushido code, the Southern United States culture of honor, the Bedouin honor code, the Kanun, the mos maiorum, the Barbagian Code, Pashtunwali, izzat, the pirate code, javānmardi, Emi Omo Eso, Futuwwa, and others
- the Cadet Honor Code and Honor Concept in the United States military
- an honor system
- an ethical code
