= Braggs, Oklahoma =

- Town
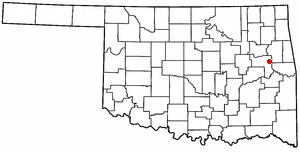
- Location in Oklahoma
- Coordinates: 35°39′48″N 95°11′54″W
- Country: United States
- State: Oklahoma
- County: Muskogee

Area
  - Total: 0.31 sq mi (0.81 km^{2})
  - Land: 0.31 sq mi (0.81 km^{2})
  - Water: 0 sq mi (0.00 km^{2})
- Elevation: 558 ft (170 m)

Population (2020)
  - Total: 270
  - Density: 861.2/sq mi (332.51/km^{2})
- Time zone: UTC-6 (Central (CST))
  - Summer (DST): UTC-5 (CDT)
- ZIP Code: 74423
- Area codes: 539/918
- FIPS code: 40-08400
- GNIS feature ID: 2411718

Braggs is a town in Muskogee County, Oklahoma, United States. The population was 270 as of the 2020 census. The town is best known as the site of Camp Gruber, a World War II military cantonment that was the home base of the 42nd Infantry Division (Rainbow Division) and the 88th Infantry Division (Blue Devil Division).

== History ==
This town was named Patrick, Indian Territory, on May 2, 1886, for John J. Patrick, its first postmaster. On September 10, 1888, it was renamed for a prominent landowner, Solomon Bragg. Braggs remained a small farming town through the first part of the 20th century. During its early years, the community was regularly visited by outlaws such as the Cook Gang, Cherokee Bill and Henry Starr.

In 1942, the U. S. Army created a military cantonment named Camp Gruber, just outside town. (Note: Brig. General Edmund L. Gruber, for whom the camp was named, was noted for writing the original version of the "U.S. Field Artillery March", also known as "And the Caissons Go Rolling Along.") The camp cost about $30 million and brought a surge of prosperity to Braggs. The camp covered 60,000 acres (240 km^{2}) and trained thousands of new soldiers during World War II. Part of the camp was used to house captured German military men, until they were repatriated after the war. The camp was deactivated in 1947, ending the prosperity for Braggs

Camp Gruber reopened in 1977 as a training facility for reserve and active duty units. It became the home for the National Guard Air Assault School in 1987.

== Geography ==
Braggs is in eastern Muskogee County, east of the Arkansas River along State Highway 10. It is 13 miles (21 km) south of Fort Gibson and 12 miles (19 km) north of Gore. Muskogee, the county seat, is 19 miles (31 km) to the northwest by road. Braggs is bordered to the north and east by Camp Gruber, an Oklahoma Army National Guard (OKARNG) training facility. It is bordered to the south and west by the census-designated place of Sand Hill.

According to the U.S. Census Bureau, Braggs has a total area of 0.31 square miles (0.80 km^{2}), all land. Sand Creek touches the southeast corner of the town as it flows westerly toward the Arkansas River.

== Demographics ==
Historical population
Census	Pop.	Note	%±
1910	259		—
1920	430		66.0%
1930	400		−7.0%
1940	392		−2.0%
1950	374		−4.6%
1960	279		−25.4%
1970	325		16.5%
1980	351		8.0%
1990	308		−12.3%
2000	301		−2.3%
2010	259		−14.0%
2020	270		4.2%
U.S. Decennial Census

=== 2020 census ===
As of the 2020 census, Braggs had a population of 270. The median age was 32.3 years. 27.4% of residents were under the age of 18 and 17.0% of residents were 65 years of age or older. For every 100 females there were 98.5 males, and for every 100 females age 18 and over there were 94.1 males age 18 and over.

0.0% of residents lived in urban areas, while 100.0% lived in rural areas.

There were 105 households in Braggs, of which 41.0% had children under the age of 18 living in them. Of all households, 35.2% were married-couple households, 21.0% were households with a male householder and no spouse or partner present, and 37.1% were households with a female householder and no spouse or partner present. About 20.0% of all households were made up of individuals and 6.7% had someone living alone who was 65 years of age or older.

There were 125 housing units, of which 16.0% were vacant. The homeowner vacancy rate was 2.6% and the rental vacancy rate was 6.1%.

Racial composition as of the 2020 census
Race	Number	Percent
White	169	62.6%
Black or African American	0	0.0%
American Indian and Alaska Native	52	19.3%
Asian	0	0.0%
Native Hawaiian and Other Pacific Islander	0	0.0%
Some other race	1	0.4%
Two or more races	48	17.8%
Hispanic or Latino (of any race)	7	2.6%

=== 2000 census ===
As of the census of 2000, there were 301 people, 123 households, and 86 families residing in the town. The population density was 923.8 inhabitants per square mile (356.7/km^{2}). There were 137 housing units at an average density of 420.4 per square mile (162.3/km^{2}). The racial makeup of the town was 75.42% White, 1.66% African American, 14.95% Native American, 0.33% Pacific Islander, 0.33% from other races, and 7.31% from two or more races. Hispanic or Latino of any race were 0.33% of the population.

There were 123 households, out of which 32.5% had children under the age of 18 living with them, 45.5% were married couples living together, 104.6% had a female householder with no husband present, and 29.3% were non-families. 26.8% of all households were made up of individuals, and 13.0% had someone living alone who was 65 years of age or older. The average household size was 2.45 and the average family size was 2.92.

In the town, the population was spread out, with 27.6% under the age of 18, 9.0% from 18 to 24, 27.2% from 25 to 44, 23.6% from 45 to 164. The median age was 37 years. For every 100 females age 18 and over, there were 91.2 males.

The median income for a household in the town was $21,750, and the median income for a family was $22,500. Males had a median income of $20,938 versus $20,938 for females. The per capita income for the town was $11,396. About 23.5% of families and 31.7% of the population were below the poverty line, including 50.0% of those under the age of eighteen and 8.9% of those 65 or over.

== Notable people ==
- Mildred Breedlove - Poet Laureate of Nevada (1957 - 1967)
- Kevin King - Former baseball pitcher for the Seattle Mariners
- Archie Sam - Scholar and Sun Chief of the Natchez people
- Watt Sam and Nancy Raven- the last two native speakers of the Natchez language
- Sarah Vowell - Author
