= Camp Gruber =

Oklahoma Army National Guard training facility

Camp Gruber Training Center
- Part of Oklahoma National Guard; United States Army
- Muskogee County, near Braggs, Oklahoma

Site information
- Type: National Guard Training Center
- Owner: U.S. Federal Government
- Controlled by: Oklahoma Military Department, (OMD)
- Open to the public: Prior Permission needed

Location
- Coordinates: 35°40′34″N 95°11′13″W

Site history
- Built: 1942
- Built by: United States Army
- In use: 1942-1947; 1967-Present
- Battles/wars: World War II, Cold War

Garrison information
- Garrison: Braggs, Oklahoma
- Occupants: Oklahoma Army National Guard

Camp Gruber is an Oklahoma Army National Guard (OKARNG) training facility near Braggs, Oklahoma, in Muskogee County. It covers a total of 87 square miles (230 km^{2}).

The base is named after Brigadier General Edmund L. Gruber, a noted artillery officer and the original composer of the U.S. Field Artillery March, the source for the Army's official song, "The Army Goes Rolling Along". Camp Gruber is located near Braggs, Oklahoma in the Cookson Hills, about 14 miles (23 km) southeast of Muskogee, Oklahoma. The Oklahoma Wildlife Department and the OKARNG have in place an agreement that allows limited hunting by civilians on the base.

== History ==
The outbreak of the Second World War in Europe in September 1939 prompted President Franklin D. Roosevelt to declare a limited national emergency on September 8 and step up military preparedness efforts. By June 1940 Congressional measures had augmented the federal budget for construction of arms and munitions plants, coastal defenses, and military training camps and expansion of existing bases. In 1939 the nation's armed forces numbered only 200,000, but plans for a six-million-man army had been made.

The War Department had carefully developed mobilization plans in 1938 and 1939, and in 1941-42 eighty-four new camps were under construction or were approved. Because Oklahoma's location, climate, natural resources, and large available work force were optimum, the War Department considered the state a good site for pilot and infantry training fields. An infantry training camp was to be built near Braggs, in the Cookson Hills.

In 1935 and 1936 the U.S. Department of Agriculture had acquired nearly 30,000 acres (120 km^{2}) of "submarginal" farm land in eastern Oklahoma, of which 27,322.23 acres (111 km^{2}) was already under federal stewardship as a parks/recreation project. More land was acquired through condemnation. These condemnations included the taking of approximately 32,000 acres (130 km^{2}) of restricted land held by the Cherokee Nation.

Some of the farmers who had owned or worked the property were relocated by the Resettlement Administration, while others were forced to leave their farms within 45 days while crops were still growing. In 1942 the entire area came under War Department control.

The Cookson Hills Project was designed to provide an infantry training center for the U.S. Army's Eighth Service Command. The camp ultimately encompassed between 60,000 and 70,000 acres (240 and 280 km^{2}) of eastern Oklahoma, or approximately 109 square miles (280 km^{2}) of land lying east of the Arkansas River and State Highway 10 in Muskogee and Cherokee counties. The closest community was Braggs, in Muskogee County; the nearest small metropolitan area was Muskogee, site of Hatbox Field and other defense facilities.

Construction on the Cookson Hills facility began in early January 1942 when men of the U.S. Army Corps of Engineers Southwestern Division were transferred from Enid Army Airfield to establish a general headquarters in Muskogee and a field headquarters in Braggs. Soon twenty-five engineers and five truckloads of equipment arrived and set about the daunting task of building a thirty-five-thousand-troop facility. In February 1942 the camp was named "Gruber," after Brigadier General Edmund L. Gruber, a long-time artillery officer at Fort Sill, Oklahoma.

Manhattan-Long Construction Company, which had built other camps in the region, presented the winning bid. The original contract called for the construction of 1,731 frame buildings, including 479 barracks, 100 hospital buildings, 55 administration buildings, a bakery, 12 chapels, a laundry, 210 mess halls, 221 recreation buildings, 258 storage warehouses; 5 theaters, 19 guard houses, 59 motor repair shops, 50 officers' quarters, and 261 miscellaneous buildings. (A prisoner war of camp was later added). A new supply system would bring water from Greenleaf Lake to a three-million-gallon (9 ac·ft) concrete storage reservoir adjacent to the camp; sewer, gas, and electrical systems and roads, grading, and drainage were built. The contractor also relocated Highway 10 around the base. Manhattan-Long estimated that it needed to construct one new building every hour, in order to meet the deadline—no real feat, for on the Fort Riley, Kansas, job the company had built one every thirty-eight minutes. The army also used preexisting buildings within the reservation boundary; a ranch house complex (built in 1936 by the Pray family) served as the post commander's billet. Construction proceeded at breakneck speed through May 1942, and the first general order was issued on May 21.

The cantonment consisted of north-south and east-west streets in a U.S. Army modified triangular division layout. This part of the facility served as an area for barracks, for general administration, for engineer, ordnance, maintenance, and chemical warfare operations, and for medical and hospital services. Immediately north of the cantonment were grenade courts, bayonet courts, and obstacle courses. North of these were three small-arms firing ranges. A huge area lying north and east of the training fields (in both Muskogee and Cherokee counties) were armor and tank destroyer driving ranges and field, anti-aircraft, and coastal artillery firing ranges (with a very large, centrally placed "impact" area that lay in Cherokee County). On the western shore of Greenleaf Lake lay a third use area with various training and recreation facilities including Greenleaf Lodge (a 1937 WPA building), used as one of the cantonment's two Officers' Clubs.

During the course of World War II Camp Gruber provided training to infantry, field artillery, and tank destroyer units that went on to fight in Europe. Units of the segregated 333rd and 969th Field Artillery Battalions (who fought from Utah Beach through Liberation Day and would be awarded the Presidential Unit Citation for their role in fighting side-by-side with the 101st Airborne Division Artillery) and 88th Infantry Division ("Blue Devil Division") trained at Camp Gruber. In 1943 the 42nd Infantry Division ("Rainbow Division") was reactivated at Gruber. In 1945 the 86th Infantry Division ("Blackhawk Division") was stationed there pending deactivation at the end of the war. Ultimately, more than 44,868 troops either served at or trained at the camp, which also employed four thousand civilian workers and incarcerated three thousand German prisoners of war (in a facility west of Highway 10, separate from the base). Adjacent to the main gate is a sheltered collection of ornate monuments crafted by the POWs, who also left their mark with post's network of brick-lined drainage canals, their continued hearty condition decades later being a testament to the Germans' engineering and workmanship. Camp Gruber served as infantry and support group training base for the U.S. Army until after the end of World War II.

On June 3, 1947, Camp Gruber was deactivated and soon became surplus property, with 63,920 acres (259 km^{2}) placed under the authority of the War Assets Administration. The federal government retained control. In 1952 the General Services Administration assumed authority over 31,294.62 acres (127 km^{2}) from the WAA, and between 1948 and 1952 the U.S. Army reassumed control of 32,626 acres (132 km^{2}). By 1953 virtually the entire 1942 reservation was in federal hands (the exception being a 900-acre (3.6 km^{2}) area that became part of Greenleaf State Park, under authority of the State of Oklahoma). During the 1950s and 1960s most Camp Gruber's original buildings and facilities were removed or destroyed.

In 1967 the Oklahoma Military Department, Oklahoma Army National Guard (OKARNG), acquired 23,515 acres (95.16 km^{2}) to establish Camp Gruber as a state-operated training area under a 25-year federal license from the Tulsa District of the U.S. Corps of Engineers. In 1973 and 1982 2,560 acres (10.36 km^{2}) and 6,952 acres (28.13 km^{2}), respectively, were added, for a total of 33,027 acres (133.66 km^{2}).
