= Robert M. Danford =

United States Army general

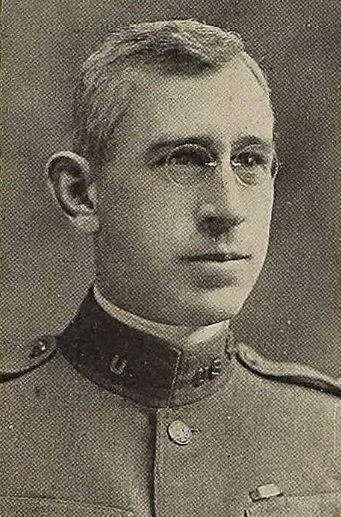
- Danford as West Point's Commandant of Cadets. From the 1920 edition of The Howitzer, the West Point yearbook.
- Born: July 7, 1879; New Boston, Illinois, United States
- Died: September 12, 1974 (aged 95); Stamford, Connecticut, United States
- Burial place: West Point Cemetery, West Point, New York, United States
- Spouse: Katherine V. Hyde (1888–1963) (m. 1909)
- Children: 1
- Military career
- Allegiance: United States
- Branch: United States Army
- Service years: 1904–1942
- Rank: Major General
- Service number: 0-1913
- Unit: Field Artillery Branch
- Commands: 10th Field Artillery Regiment, Connecticut National Guard; 129th Field Artillery Regiment; Field Artillery Replacement Depot, Camp Jackson, South Carolina; Commandant of Cadets, United States Military Academy; 13th Field Artillery Regiment; Chief of Field Artillery
- Conflicts: Mexican Border War; World War I World War II
- Awards: U.S. Army Distinguished Service Medal; Order of the Crown (Belgium); Order of the British Empire (Commander)
- Other work: Commander, City Patrol Corps, New York City Police Department; President, West Point Association of Graduates; Secretary and treasurer, executive director, West Point Alumni Foundation

Robert M. Danford (July 7, 1879 – September 12, 1974) was an American military leader. A career officer in the United States Army, he served in both World War I and World War II, and attained the rank of major general. His notable assignments included Commandants of Cadets at the United States Military Academy and Chief of Field Artillery.

Born in New Boston, Illinois as the son of a Union Army veteran of the American Civil War, Danford graduated from the United States Military Academy in 1904, and began a long career in the Army's Field Artillery branch. He worked his way through the ranks in staff positions of increasing responsibility, and commanded a battery on the Arizona-Mexico border during the Border War that took place at the time of the Mexican Revolution. During World War I, Danford commanded several units and trained National Guard and regular Army artillery soldiers for service in France, and received promotion to temporary brigadier general.

After World War I, Danford continued to serve in high profile assignments, including Commandant of Cadets at West Point. In addition, he graduated from the United States Army Command and General Staff College and the United States Army War College. He commanded the 13th Field Artillery Regiment from 1935 to 1937, and was Chief of Field Artillery as a major general during World War II, serving from 1938 until retiring in 1942.

After retiring from the Army, Danford commanded the wartime civilian auxiliary of the New York City Police Department until the end of World War II in 1945, and was active in West Point alumni affairs. He died in Stamford, Connecticut in 1974, and was buried at West Point Cemetery.

== Early life ==
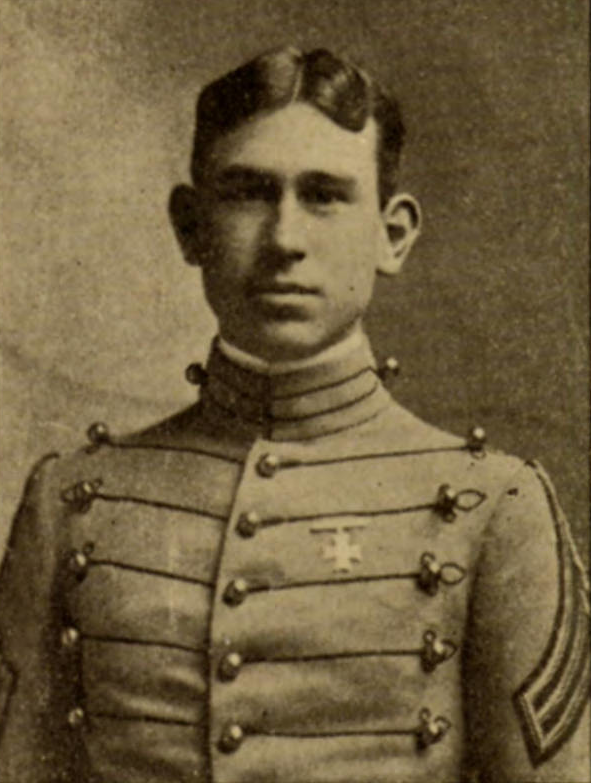
Danford at West Point c. 1904

Robert Melville Danford was born in New Boston, Illinois on July 7, 1879. His mother was Dora Noble Danford (1855-1894), and his father was Melville Cox Danford (1847-1921), a farmer and American Civil War veteran of the Union Army's 16th Illinois Volunteer Infantry Regiment.

Danford was educated in New Boston, Mannon, and Aledo and at the academy which was part of Mount Vernon, Iowa's Cornell College. In 1899, he earned a Master of Accounts degree from Gem City Business College in Quincy, Illinois. In 1900, Danford began attendance at the United States Military Academy. He graduated 33rd in a class of 124 in June 1904 and was commissioned as a second lieutenant in the Field Artillery.

== Start of career ==
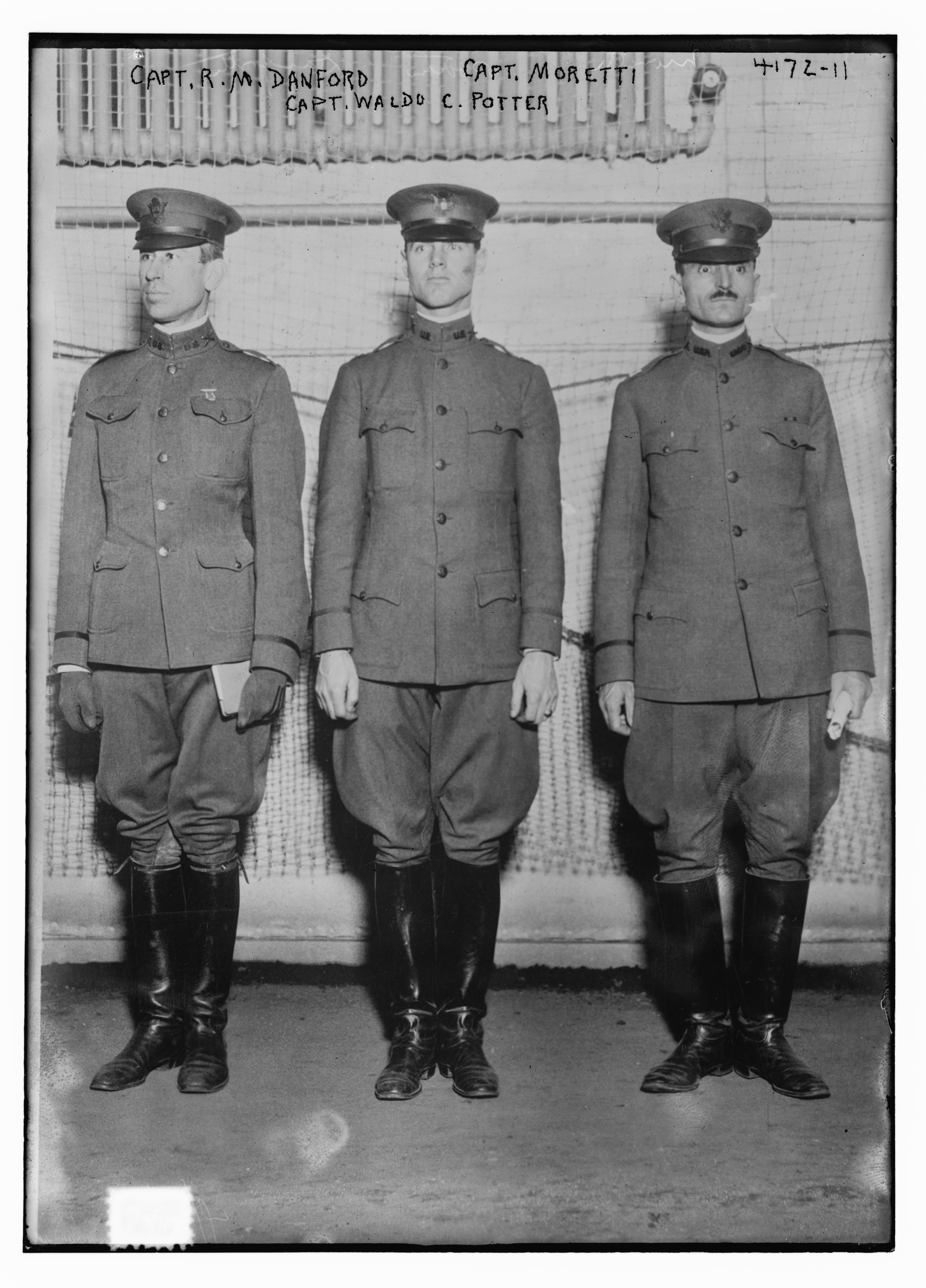
Danford left, photographed by Bain New Service with Captains Waldo C. Potter and Onorio Moretti, who served with him on the Yale University faculty

Danford's initial posting was to the 5th Field Artillery Regiment at Fort Riley, Kansas. While with the 5th Artillery, he served in the Philippines and on temporary duty with the coast artillery at the Presidio of San Francisco. He also attended the Mounted Service School at Fort Riley, and after graduation in 1907 he was assigned as the school's secretary. Danford was also promoted to first lieutenant in 1907. While serving in the Philippines in 1908, Danford assisted Edmund L. Gruber in authoring the lyrics to "The Caisson Song", which was later adapted into the "U.S. Field Artillery March" and then "The Army Goes Rolling Along". In 1910, Danford was assigned as aide-de-camp to Brigadier General Frederick K. Ward, the commander of Fort Riley and commandant of the Mounted Service School.

In 1911, Danford was assigned to the Army's remount depot near Lexington, Kentucky to undertake a study of horses and horse breeding, with the goal of determining the best methods for the Army to procure and employ the horses it needed for artillery, cavalry, transportation, and supply activities. He commanded a battery at Fort Sill, Oklahoma from 1912 to 1914, including service on the Arizona-Mexico border during the Border War that took place during the Mexican Revolution. From 1914 to 1915 Danford was an instructor at the Army's Field Artillery School. Danford was based at Yale University in New Haven, Connecticut from 1915 to 1917, and served as senior instructor and inspector of the Connecticut National Guard. During this assignment, Danford was promoted to major, lieutenant colonel, and colonel in the National Guard and assigned to command Connecticut's 10th Field Artillery Regiment. He was promoted to captain in the Army in 1916.

== World War I ==
In 1916, the 10th Field Artillery was activated for federal service in World War I, and Danford commanded the regiment during its initial training at Tobyhanna Army Depot. From February to July 1917, Danford was assigned as assistant professor of military science at Yale University, and served as the mustering officer for members of the Connecticut National Guard as they entered federal service. While at Yale, Danford co-authored Notes on Training Field Artillery Details, a practical manual for teaching field artillery tactics and techniques. It quickly became the Army's standard reference work for training field artillery soldiers, and went through numerous printings during and after World War I. In July 1917, Danford served as mustering officer for members of the Pennsylvania National Guard, after which he traveled to Fort Sill, where he served as an artillery instructor. Originally slated to join the 42nd Division, in August, he was instead assigned to the 302nd Field Artillery, a unit of the 76th Division. He trained with the regiment at Camp Devens, Massachusetts, after which he was assigned to Plattsburgh Barracks, New York as senior instructor of field artillery for the Army's second wartime Officers' Training Camp. He was promoted to major in August, and temporary lieutenant colonel on the same day.

Danford returned to Fort Sill in December 1917, this time to assume command of the 129th Field Artillery Regiment, a Missouri National Guard unit which he led through its initial organization and training after it was federalized for the war. Among the regiment's soldiers was Harry S. Truman, who later said he learned more practical, useful information from Danford in six weeks than from six months of formal Army instruction. When Truman later served as an artillery instructor, he consciously patterned his approach on Danford's.

In April, 1918, Danford was assigned to Camp Jackson, South Carolina to command the Field Artillery Replacement Depot, which provided new artillery soldiers to fill vacancies in units as they were organized, and to bring depleted front line units back up to full strength. He commanded the depot until December, and was promoted to temporary colonel in July 1918, and temporary brigadier general the following month.

From December 1918 to May 1919, Danford served on the staff of the Chief of Field Artillery. In May, he went to France where he carried out an observation and inspection tour as a member of the American Expeditionary Forces staff.

== Post-World War I ==
After the war, Danford returned to his permanent rank of captain (March 1919); in August, 1919 he was promoted to permanent major. From August 1919 to July 1923, Danford served as Commandant of Cadets at West Point. From 1923 to 1924 he was a student at the United States Army Command and General Staff College, after which he served again on the staff of the Chief of Field Artillery.

Danford attended the United States Army War College from 1928 to 1929; after graduation, he was assigned to the 13th Field Artillery Regiment at Schofield Barracks, Hawaii. From 1931 to 1935, Danford served as executive officer to the Chief of Field Artillery, and from 1935 to 1937 he commanded the 13th Field Artillery at Schofield Barracks. He was promoted to permanent lieutenant colonel in 1928, and permanent colonel in 1935. From 1937 to 1938, Danford served at Fort Sheridan, Illinois as chief of staff for the VI Corps Area.

== World War II ==
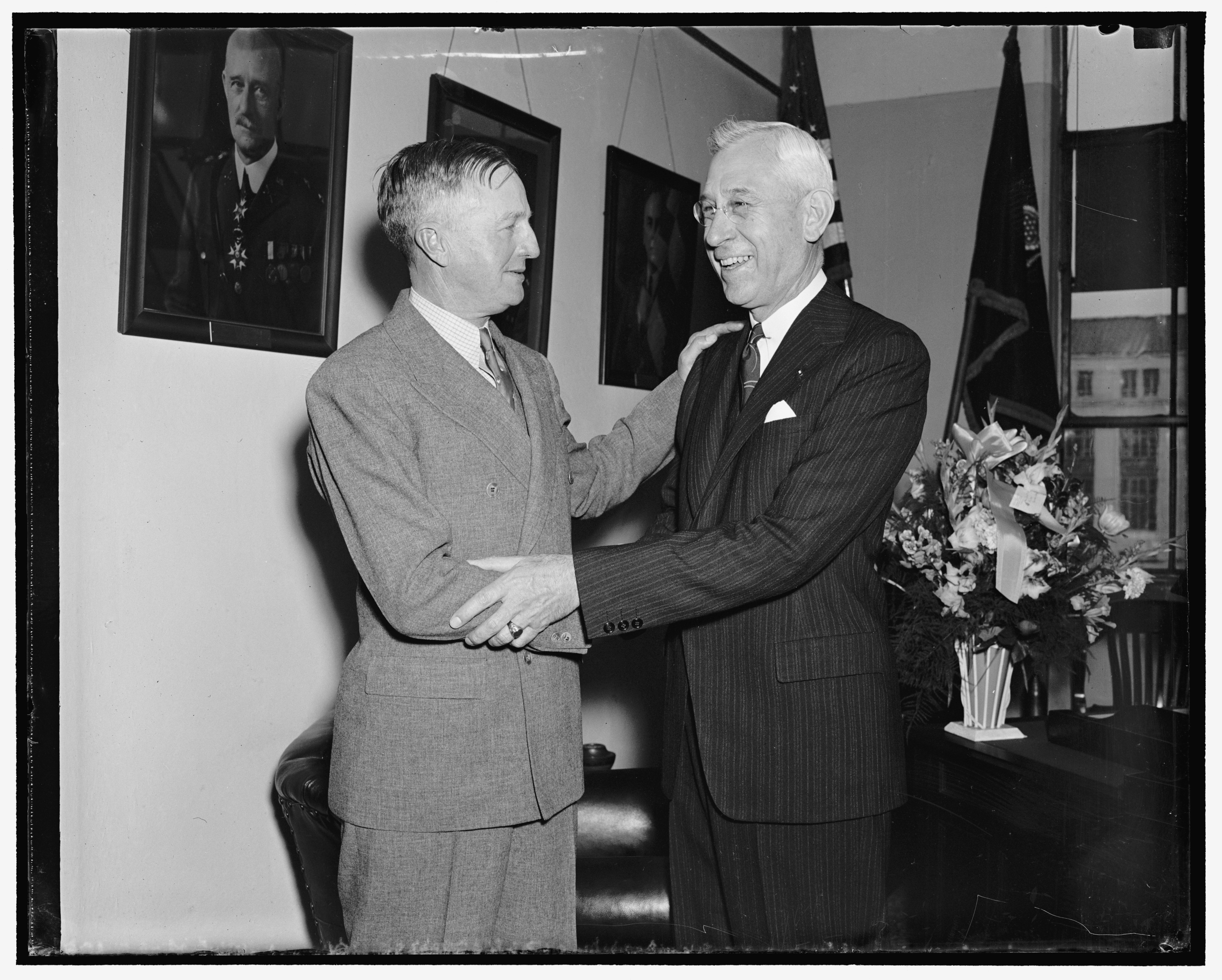
Danford (right) congratulates John Knowles Herr, who became the Chief of Cavalry on the same day Danford became Chief of Field Artillery

In 1938, Danford was selected to succeed Upton Birnie Jr. as Chief of Field Artillery and promoted to major general. As the United States increased preparation for involvement in World War II and then entered the war, Danford's tenure was largely concerned with equipping, manning, and training artillery units as they were organized and fielded for wartime service. Though Danford had been seen as an opponent of technological advances, such as advocating for the use of horse-drawn artillery instead of mechanization, after firsthand observation of how effective light aircraft were for artillery observation he became a strong proponent, and helped ensure that the Army used airplanes for identifying targets, observing the impact of indirect fire, and assessing its effectiveness.

Danford retired in 1942, when the Army eliminated the branch chief positions in favor of consolidating their functions under the commander of the Army Ground Forces.

== Awards ==
For his service in World War I, Danford received the U.S. Army Distinguished Service Medal, Belgian Order of the Crown, and honorary Order of the British Empire (Commander). The citation for his Army DSM reads:

The President of the United States of America, authorized by Act of Congress, July 9, 1918, takes pleasure in presenting the Army Distinguished Service Medal to Brigadier General Robert Melville Danford, United States Army, for exceptionally meritorious and distinguished services to the Government of the United States, in a duty of great responsibility during World War I. While on duty in the Office of the Chief of Field Artillery, General Danford displayed marked ability in planning the organization of field artillery replacement depots. He then proceeded to Camp Jackson, South Carolina, established this depot, and administered it during the remainder of the war with rare ability and judgment.

In addition, in 1917 he received the honorary degree of Master of Arts from Yale University. In 1975, the museum board at Fort Sill designated one of the post's residence buildings as Danford House, and installed a plaque commemorating Danford's career. Built in the 1870s, the limestone house has traditionally been the quarters of Fort Sill's chief of staff.

== Later career ==
After retiring from the military, Danford organized and commanded the City Patrol Corps, a civilian auxiliary of the New York City Police Department, which provided wartime security for power plants, water filtration plants, and other sensitive facilities.

In August 1951, Time reported that 90 of West Point's 2,500 cadets were facing dismissal for mass violations of the Cadet Honor Code. The Army arranged for an investigation by a panel which included famed jurist Learned Hand and retired generals Troy H. Middleton, then president of Louisiana State University, and Danford. The board found that some of the accused cadets, most of whom were on the football team, had been receiving the answers to exams ahead of time through upper class students who were assisting them as tutors. Others were accused of knowing about the cheating, but failing to report it. The panel recommended dismissal of all 90 suspected violators; they were eventually allowed to resign, and many transferred to other schools.

Danford also served as president of the West Point Association of Graduates, secretary and treasurer and executive director of the West Point Alumni Foundation, and editor of the Register of Graduates and Former Cadets of the United States Military Academy. Danford also authored a genealogical work, 1967's The Nobles and the Raders: Being a Compilation of Members and Descendants of the Noble and Rader Families Who Were Amongst the Earliest Pioneer Settlers of Mercer County, Illinois.

== Death and burial ==
Danford died in Stamford, Connecticut on September 12, 1974. He was buried at West Point Cemetery, Section II, Row A, Site 17.

== Family ==
In 1909, Danford married Katherine V. Hyde (1888-1963) in Oakland, California. Katherine Hyde was the daughter of Alice Evelyn Van de Carr Hyde (1855-1916) and Marcus Darius Hyde (1849-1930). Marcus Hyde was a graduate of the United States Naval Academy, an attorney, and a member of the California State Assembly. Robert and Katherine Danford were the parents of one child, Janet (1915-1972), the wife of Colonel James B. Wells (1909-1996).

== Sources ==
=== Internet ===
- Thayer, Bill (May 5, 2015). "Robert Melville Danford in Biographical Register of the Officers and Graduates of the United States Military Academy". penelope.uchicago.edu/Thayer/E/home.html. Chicago, IL: Bill Thayer.
- "Memorial, James B. Wells 1934". apps.westpointaog.org. West Point, NY: West Point Association of Graduates. 1996.
- "Robert M. Danford and Katherine V. Hyde in the California Marriage Records from Select Counties, 1850-1941". Ancestry.com. Provo, UT: Ancestry.com, LLC. October 7, 1909.
- 84th Division Alumni Association (May 10, 2017). ""The Army Goes Rolling Along" - The Official Song of The United States Army" (PDF). 84thdivalumni.com. 84th Division Alumni Association.

=== Books ===
- Adams, John A. (2015). General Jacob Devers: World War II's Forgotten Four Star. Bloomington, IN: Indiana University Press. ISBN 978-0-253-01517-4.
- Ambrose, Stephen E. (1999). Duty, Honor, Country: A History of West Point. Baltimore, MD: Johns Hopkins University Press. ISBN 978-0-8018-6293-9.
- Danford, Robert M.; Moretti, Onorio (1918). Notes on Training Field Artillery Details. New Haven, CT: Yale University Press.
- Danford, Robert M. (1967). The Nobles and the Raders: Being a Compilation of Members and Descendants of the Noble and Rader Families Who Were Amongst the Earliest Pioneer Settlers of Mercer County, Illinois. Darien, CT: R. M. Danford.
- Davis, Henry Blaine Jr. (1998). Generals in Khaki. Raleigh, NC: Pentland Press. ISBN 1-57197-088-6.
- Giangreco, D. M. (2009). The Soldier from Independence: A Military Biography of Harry Truman. Minneapolis, MN: Zenith Press. ISBN 978-0-7603-3209-2.
- Hadley, Arthur Twining (1917). Catalogue of the Officers and Graduates of Yale University. New Haven, CT: Yale University. p. 750 – via Google Books.
- Marquis, Albert Nelson (1944). Who's Who in America. Vol. 23. Chicago, IL: A. N. Marquis.
- McKenney, Janice E. (2007). The Organizational History of Field Artillery 1775-2003. Washington, DC: Center of Military History, United States Army. ISBN 978-0-16-077114-9.
- Offner, Arnold A. (2002). Another Such Victory: President Truman and the Cold War, 1945-1953. Stanford, CA: Stanford University Press. ISBN 978-0-8047-4254-2.
- Raines, Edgar F. (2000). Eyes of Artillery: The Origins of Modern U.S. Army Aviation in World War II. Washington, DC: Center of Military History, United States Army. ISBN 978-1-5058-5478-7.
- U.S. Army Adjutant General (1942). Official Army Register. Washington, D.C.: United States Government Printing Office.

=== Newspapers ===
- "Biography, Marcus D. Hyde". Oakland Tribune. Oakland, CA. January 27, 1890 – via Newspapers.com.
- "News of Society Across the Bay: Robert Melville Van Ford (sic) and Katherine Hyde". San Francisco Call. San Francisco, CA. October 8, 1909 – via Newspapers.com.
- "Obituary, M. C. Danford". The Dispatch. Moline, IL. December 31, 1921 – via Newspapers.com.
- "Robert M. Danford, Retired General, 95". New York Times. New York, NY. September 14, 1974.
- "Maj. Gen. Danford dies in Connecticut". The Rock Island Argus. Moline, IL. September 17, 1974. p. 19 – via Newspapers.com.
- "New Designation". Lawton Morning Press. Lawton, OK. October 25, 1975 – via Newspapers.com.
- "Largest Museum in the Army Hosts Variety of Events". Lawton Constitution. Lawton, OK. January 25, 1976 – via Newspapers.com.
- Berberea, Marie (November 1, 2013). "Fort Sill's Historic Homes Pack Tales Of Haunts". Army.mil. Washington, DC.

=== Magazines ===
- "Biographical Sketch, Robert M. Danford" (PDF). The Field Artillery Journal. Vol. 32. Fort Sill, OK: United States Field Artillery Association. April 1, 1942.
