= Andrew Garrett =

Andrew Garrett may refer to:

- Andrew Garrett (explorer) (1823–1887), American explorer, naturalist and illustrator
- Andrew Garrett (linguist), American professor of linguistics at the University of California, Berkeley
- Andrew Takuya Garrett, American politician, member of the Hawaii House of Representatives
- Andrew Garrett (statistician), pharmaceutical statistician and president (2023-2024) of the Royal Statistical Society

== See also ==
- Drew Garrett (born 1989), American actor
