= California Language Archive =

Linguistics project

The California Language Archive (CLA), housed in the Survey of California and Other Indian Languages at the University of California at Berkeley, documents, catalogs, and archives the indigenous languages of the Americas. The CLA also hosts events related to language revitalization and preservation.

== Origins ==
The CLA was started as a pilot project by Berkeley linguistics professors Murray Emeneau and Mary Haas on January 1, 1953. Haas was a particular influence on the early working culture of the CLA. One student, Brent D. Galloway, recalled how several of Haas' students had used a Natchez greeting, wanhetahnú·ʼis, and that "the tradition had apparently continued for over twenty years." (Haas' first publication had been on Natchez.)

The first project was a study of the Karuk language by William Bright, then a graduate student. Since its founding 80 doctoral dissertations have been written under the auspices of the CLA.

== International networks ==
The California Language Archive is a member of the Digital Endangered Languages and Musics Archives Network (DELAMAN).

== Publications ==
The CLA published a series of "Reports" beginning in 1981, covering a variety of topics related to languages of California as well as Native American languages elsewhere. Some volumes were standalone works such as dictionaries, others were collections of varied articles. Beginning in 1976 the CLA began publishing the proceedings of Hokan–Penutian Workshop, which addressed the proposed Hokan and Penutian language families. Both resources are available online.

In 2011, a grant from the National Endowment for the Humanities made it possible to merge online resources from CLA and the Berkeley Language Center (BLC) into a single website.

== Directors ==
In addition to Haas, the CLA has been directed by Wallace Chafe and Leanne Hinton. The current director is Andrew Garrett.

== See also ==
- Classification of indigenous languages of the Americas
- Indigenous languages of California
- Classification of Native Americans in California
- Native American history of California
- Traditional narratives (Native California)
- Population of Native California
