= Onowa McIvor =

- Born: Northern Saskatchewan
- Citizenship: Canadian
- Occupation: President of the Foundation for Endangered Languages in Canada
- Spouse: Paul Whitinui

Onowa McIvor is an Associate Professor and the former Director of Indigenous Education at the University of Victoria. She is also the President of the Foundation for Endangered Languages in Canada.

She contributes to research areas such as Indigenous language revitalization, Indigenous education, early childhood bilingualism, cultural identity development, and early childhood care and education. Onowa has also done research on MAP's (Mentor-Apprentice Programs) with a fellow scholar, Peter Jacobs. She has also completed various research projects supporting the correlation between language revitalization and well-being in Indigenous communities.

== Early life and education ==
Born and raised in Northern Saskatchewan, Onowa is of Swampy Cree and Scottish-Canadian descent. McIvor attended the University of Victoria and received her Masters in Child and Youth Care in 2005 before attending the University of British Columbia where she completed her PhD in Languages and Literacy Education in 2012. Her 2012 dissertation, "îkakwiy nîhiyawiyân: I am learning [to be] Cree", explored learning an ancestral language as an adult.

== Academic career ==
McIvor began her academic career as a Curriculum Developer for an Indigenous language issues course at the Camosun College in Victoria, BC. She then became a Researcher/Writer for the Office of the Provincial Advisor for Aboriginal Infant Development Programs, Aboriginal Head Start Association of BC, Public Health Agency of Canada, BC Aboriginal Child Care Society, First Peoples' Heritage, Language, and Culture Council, Ministry for Children and Family Development, and the Victoria Native Friendship Centre. In her final years before obtaining her position at the University of Victoria, Onowa returned to her alma mater, where she worked as a research assistant for the Faculty of Human and Social Development. She also held a position as a Workshop Coordinator for Little Drum Consulting.

In 2008, she acquired the position of Director of Indigenous Education at the University of Victoria and simultaneously became a Senior Lecturer.

In 2012, McIvor was promoted to Assistant Professor.

In 2017, McIvor was promoted to Associate Professor and concluded a 9-year term as Director of Indigenous Education.

== Awards and achievements ==
In 2016, McIvor was awarded the Bobby Wright Award, which acknowledges and honours early career contributions to research in Indigenous education.

== Publications ==
=== Thesis/Dissertation ===
- "Building the nests: Indigenous language revitalization in Canada through early childhood immersion programs." (2005). University of Victoria.
- "îkakwiy nîhiyawiyân: I am learning [to be] Cree." (2012). University of British Columbia.

=== Papers/Articles ===
- "The contribution of Indigenous heritage language immersion programs to healthy early childhood development." (2005). Research Connections Canada.
- "Learning About Teaching As If Communities Mattered: Strengthening Capacity Through Partnerships." (2005). University of Victoria.
- "Language and Culture as Protective Factors for At-Risk Communities." (2009). Journal of Aboriginal Health.
- "Strategies for Indigenous language revitalization and maintenance." (2009). Canadian Language and Literary Research Network.
- "I Am My Subject: Blending Indigenous Research Methodology and Autoethnography Through Integrity-based, Spirit-based Research." (2010). Canadian Journal of Native Education.
- "The protective effects of language learning, use and culture on the health and well-being of Aboriginal people in Canada." (2013). The Foundation for Endangered Languages.
- "The World Indigenous Research Alliance (WIRA): Mediating and Mobilizing Indigenous Peoples' Educational Knowledge and Aspirations." (2015). Education Policy Analysis Archives.

=== Books ===
==== Chapters ====
- "Canada's big chill: Indigenous languages in education." (2013). Sense Publishers: Rotterdam, The Netherlands.
- "Adult Indigenous language learning in Western Canada: What is holding us back?" (2015). Linus Books: New York.
