= Master-Apprentice Language Learning Program =

Language revival strategy

The Master-Apprentice Language Learning Program is a strategy used in language revitalization, in which committed language learners (apprentices) work with fluent speakers (mentors) to "create their own oral language-immersive context through daily activities, cultural practices, and community involvement". Originally introduced in the 1992, the method is increasingly popular across North America and around the world.

The program was developed by Leanne Hinton and Nancy Richardson Steele, working with the Native California Network and its subsidiary committee, the Advocates for Indigenous California Language Survival. The program was developed in collaboration with the speakers of six Indigenous California languages: Karuk, Hupa, Yurok, Wintu, Yowlumne, and Mojave. The MALLP ran for the first time in the summer of 1993, and has grown each year since its inception. By 1996, only three years after it began, the program funded 26 teams, covering the original six languages, as well as Patwin, Paiute, and Kiliwa.

Onowa McIvor and Peter Jacobs from the University of Victoria, in particular, conducted a study of Mentor-Apprentice learners in BC and determined that this program is particularly effective for teaching adults.

== Design ==
The program was designed to be easily utilized by groups without extensive linguistic training, allowing communities to use the program on their own. It was also designed to align with the traditional learning style of California indigenous groups, which favours a one-on-one, voluntary learning environment, as opposed to the Western model of education that emphasizes competition among students and negative consequences for poor performance (i.e. poor grades). The need for a program like the MALLP was evident due to the resource- and people-heavy nature of school-based language revitalization programs, like those used among the Māori, Irish, Hawaiians, and Welsh. In addition, most of the parental generation of indigenous California communities no longer spoke their ancestral language, eliminating the possibility of revitalization through use of the language in the home. Because of these issues, the MALLP was developed with the aim of assisting young professionals in these communities, and current and future parents, to become proficient speakers of their language.

== Program ==
The main goal of the MALLP is that the apprentice attains proficiency in their language over a few years, through the creation of mini-immersion settings within each team. To create the mini-immersion settings, the teams are encouraged to go about their daily lives as normal, for a minimum number of hours per week, but to always communicate in the language that is being learned. The program incorporates techniques from several language-learning programs, including Total Physical Response.

The MALLP is based on ten main points:

1. Teams should strive to communicate only in their language, and avoid English as much as possible.
2. Teams should use nonverbal communication to embed the language in actions, gestures, and expressions.
3. Masters should aim to teach their apprentices through the use of full sentences, and normal conversation.
4. Teams should strive to have all their real communication occur in their language, not just specific instructional periods.
5. It is important to recognize that language is part of culture, rather than being a separate entity from it.
6. Teams should focus on developing the apprentice's ability to speak and listen in their language, and think less about writing and grammatical analysis.
7. Teams should develop activities to complete together, to allow for more opportunities for diverse language use.
8. Whenever needed, audio and video recordings are encouraged to aid the apprentice.
9. The concept of active learning is critical to the apprentice's success.
10. It is important to be attentive to the needs of both members of the team.

== Adoption ==
Since its creation, Mentor-Apprentice programs have been adopted by several other Indigenous language groups, including:

- Aboriginal groups in Australia
- the First Peoples' Cultural Council in British Columbia,
- Michif revitalization program in Manitoba
- in Alaska
- in Northwest Territories
- in Nunavut and Yukon
- Mi'gmaw Language Mentor Apprentice Program
- Complementary Aanaar Saami language education program in Finland
