= Cadet Honor Code =

Code of conduct in American military academies

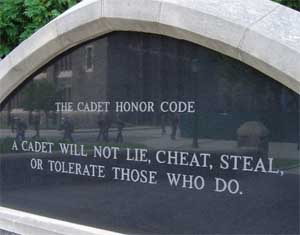
Honor Code Monument at West Point Military Academy

In the United States, a Cadet Honor Code is a system of ethics or code of conduct applying to cadets studying at military academies. These codes exist at the federal service academies, such as the United States Military Academy and the United States Air Force Academy and at the senior military colleges, as well as other military schools and colleges. The United States Naval Academy and United States Coast Guard Academy have a related standard, known as the Honor Concept.

Since it applies to all facets of a cadet's life, a cadet honor code is distinct from an academic honor code, which is used at many universities and colleges around the world but applies to academic conduct only. The codes apply to all cadets enrolled in the military programs at the institutions which use them.

== The U.S. Military Academy at West Point ==
West Point's Cadet Honor Code reads simply that

A cadet will not lie, cheat, steal, or tolerate those who do.

Cadets accused of violating the Honor Code face a standardized investigative and hearing process. First they are tried by a jury of their peers. If they are found guilty, the case will go up to the commandant of the academy who will give his recommendation, then to the superintendent of the academy, who has the discretion to either impose sanctions or recommend that the Secretary of the Army expel the cadet from the academy.

=== Three rules of thumb ===
1. Does this action attempt to deceive anyone or allow anyone to be deceived?
2. Does this action gain or allow the gain of privilege or advantage to which I or someone else would not otherwise be entitled?
3. Would I be satisfied by the outcome if I were on the receiving end of this action?

=== History and relevance ===
The premise behind the Honor Code is as old as the academy itself. When the academy was founded in 1802, the officer corps operated on a simple code of honor—an officer's word was his bond. Sylvanus Thayer, superintendent of the academy from 1817 to 1833, explicitly banned cheating as part of his efforts to increase the academy's scholarship standards. Allegations of theft were dealt with under normal Army regulations until the 1920s. The first major step toward formalizing the unwritten Honor Code came in 1922 when Superintendent Douglas MacArthur formed the first Cadet Honor Committee, which reviewed all allegations of honor infractions. In 1947, Superintendent Maxwell Taylor drafted the first official Honor Code publication, which is considered the first codification of the Cadet Honor Code. Although failure to report violations had long been reckoned as grounds for expulsion, the code wasn't formally amended to expressly forbid "toleration" until 1970.

In August 1951, Time reported that 90 of the academy's 2,500 cadets were facing dismissal for mass violations of the honor code related to "cribbing", receiving the answers to exams ahead of time, allegedly through upperclass tutors who were assisting other cadets, mostly dedicated football players, to study for those exams.

The Army arranged for an investigation by a panel which included famed jurist Learned Hand and retired generals Troy H. Middleton, then president of Louisiana State University, and Robert M. Danford, a former commandant of cadets at West Point. The board recommended dismissal of all 90 suspected violators of the Honor Code, and while the Army and Congress debated the issue and its causes, the cadets were left with a cloud hanging over their heads and their futures.

There have been other instances of mass cheating scandals at the academy, including two very famous ones. In August 1976, where it was found that possibly over half of the junior class at the academy had violated the honor code by cheating on a case assignment. In 1951, 37 members of the football team were dismissed after they were found to have cheated. The team was so decimated that it fell to 2–7, the only losing record suffered by legendary coach Red Blaik.

In 2015, West Point adopted the Willful Admission Program, which offered leniency to cadets for first-time violations of the Honor Code. In December 2020, 73 cadets were accused of cheating on a calculus exam in May 2020, when West Point had shifted to virtual classes due to the COVID-19 pandemic. A total of 59 cadets admitted to cheating on the exam. Of the 73 accused cadets, six resigned while being investigated; four cadets were acquitted, and cases were dropped against two. Among the 61 cadets found guilty of cheating, eight were expelled, including several who were eligible to apply for readmission to West Point after serving for eight months to a year as enlisted soldiers. Fifty-one cadets admitted responsibility and entered the Willful Admission Process, under which they were placed on probation and required to complete after-hours classes and discussions on ethics. As part of the program, 51 cadets were turned back a year and two were turned back six months. In 2021, the academy ended the Willful Admission Process after concluding that it was ineffective at encouraging compliance with the Honor Code.

== U.S. Air Force Academy ==
The Cadet Honor Code at the Air Force Academy, like that at West Point, is the cornerstone of a cadet's professional training and development – the minimum standard of ethical conduct that cadets expect of themselves and their fellow cadets. Air Force's honor code was developed and adopted by the Class of 1959, the first class to graduate from the academy, and has been handed down to every subsequent class. The code adopted was based largely on West Point's Honor Code, but was modified slightly to its current wording:

We will not lie, steal, or cheat, nor tolerate among us anyone who does.

In 1984, the Cadet Wing voted to add an "Honor Oath", which was to be taken by all cadets. The oath is administered to fourth class cadets (freshmen) when they are formally accepted into the wing at the conclusion of Basic Cadet Training. The oath consists of a statement of the code, followed by a resolution to live honorably:

We will not lie, steal or cheat, nor tolerate among us anyone who does.
Furthermore, I resolve to do my duty and to live honorably (so help me God).

Cadets are considered the "guardians and stewards" of the code. Cadet honor representatives throughout the wing oversee the honor system by conducting education classes and investigating possible honor incidents. Cadets throughout the wing are expected to sit on honor boards as juries that determine whether their fellow cadets violated the code. Cadets also recommend sanctions for violations. Although the presumed sanction for a violation is disenrollment, mitigating factors may result in the violator being placed in a probationary status for some period of time.

== Senior military colleges ==
The Cadet Honor Codes, described within the Cadet Honor Manuals, belong to the Corps of Cadets at these institutions and is administered by cadets. It is each cadet's duty upon enrollment to be familiar with the honor system as set forth in the Honor Manual and to abide by the Honor Code. Simply stated, the code demands that a cadet does not lie, cheat, or steal, nor tolerate those who do. These codes apply to all cadets at The Citadel, North Georgia, Norwich, Mass Maritime, Texas A&M, Virginia Military Institute, and Virginia Tech, although the systems of administration, enforcement, and sanctions vary between institutions.

== In popular culture ==
The 2005 ESPN made-for-TV movie Code Breakers was about the 1951 scandal in which 83 West Point cadets were implicated in violations of the Cadet Honor Code in order to help the West Point football team.

The 1975 TV movie The Silence is a recounting of the case of Cadet James Pelosi, who though accused of an honor code violation maintained his innocence and refused to resign from the Military Academy; and as a result was "silenced" by his fellow cadets as permitted under such circumstances by the Honor Code at that time. He was isolated from the other cadets, was not permitted to have roommates, and had to eat all his meals at a separate table. He was not spoken to by other cadets or officers except on duty, and then only on matters of duty; and when addressed was addressed as "Mister", not by name. Pelosi endured 19 months of this treatment, but went on to graduate with his class in 1973.

The Long Gray Line, a 1955 biopic of Master Sergeant Martin Maher, who served in the West Point Athletic Department as both an Army enlisted man and a civilian employee, featured a sequence concerning a cadet who married a girl on impulse while on leave. Even though the marriage was immediately annulled, Sergeant Maher pointed out to the cadet that there was the Honor Code to consider. (Cadets at West Point cannot be married, an inflexible rule even today.) The cadet in question submitted his resignation rather than face the Honor Committee.

Jimmy Cagney starred in the 1950 movie The West Point Story. Part of the plot involved his character, Elwin "Bix" Bixby, a World War II combat veteran and Broadway director, living at West Point as a plebe cadet and occasionally running afoul of the Honor Code.
