= Breath of Life (language restoration workshops) =

In Breath of Life workshops, linguists help members of Native American communities access and use archival material documenting their ancestral languages in the interest of language restoration and revitalization. This is particularly important for the many communities that no longer have fluent speakers of their languages. They are held biannually in June at U.C. Berkeley and at the University of Oklahoma in Norman in even-numbered years, and at the Smithsonian Institution in Washington, DC in odd-numbered years. The project was initiated in the early 1990s at the University of California Berkeley, in part by linguist Leanne Hinton.

== Norman, Oklahoma ==
The Oklahoma Breath of Life, Silent No More Workshop is held at the Sam Noble Oklahoma Museum of Natural History on the campus of the University of Oklahoma in Norman, Oklahoma. It has been funded by grants from the "Documenting Endangered Languages" (DEL) program, a joint project of the National Science Foundation and the National Endowment for the Humanities.

The purpose of the workshop is to teach participants how to:

- Find archived language materials
- Read phonetic writing
- Understand how their language works
- Start a database to manage and access their language information
- Begin the process of language and cultural revitalization
- Create fun and interactive teaching materials from old sources

== Washington, D.C. ==
The Breath of Life Institute has been supported by "Documenting Endangered Languages" (DEL), a joint program of the National Science Foundation and the National Endowment for the Humanities. Partners include the National Museum of Natural History, The National Museum of the American Indian, the Library of Congress, The Endangered Language Fund, and Yale University.
