= Mary Haas =

American linguist (1910–1996)

- Born: January 23, 1910; Richmond, Indiana
- Died: May 17, 1996 (aged 86); Berkeley, California
- Known for: Training linguists; work in North American Indian languages; work in Thai, and historical linguistics.
- Spouses: Morris Swadesh (m. 1931; div. 1937) Heng R. Subhanka (div. 1949)
- Awards: Honorary doctorates from: Northwestern University, 1975; University of Chicago 1976; Earlham College, 1980; Ohio State University, 1980

Academic background
- Education: PhD in linguistics, Yale University, 1935
- Alma mater: Earlham College; University of Chicago; Yale University
- Thesis: A Grammar of the Tunica Language (1935)
- Doctoral advisor: Edward Sapir

Academic work
- Discipline: Linguist
- Sub-discipline: Historical linguistics, Language documentation
- Institutions: University of California, Berkeley
- Doctoral students: William Bright, William Shipley, Karl Teeter, Catherine Callaghan, Margaret Langdon, Terrence Kaufman, Victor Golla, Marc Okrand, Sydney Lamb
- Main interests: Native American languages, Thai

Mary Rosamond Haas (/hɑːs/ HAHSS; January 23, 1910 – May 17, 1996) was an American linguist who specialized in North American indigenous languages, Thai, and historical linguistics. She served as president of the Linguistic Society of America. She was elected a fellow of the American Academy of Arts and Sciences and a member of the National Academy of Sciences.

== Early life and education ==
Haas was born in Richmond, Indiana. She attended high school and Earlham College in Richmond.

She completed her PhD in linguistics at Yale University in 1935 at the age of 25, with a dissertation titled A Grammar of the Tunica Language. In the 1930s, Haas worked with the last native speaker of Tunica, Sesostrie Youchigant, producing extensive texts and vocabularies.

== Career and research ==
=== Early work in linguistics ===
Haas undertook graduate work on comparative philology at the University of Chicago. She studied under Edward Sapir, whom she later followed to Yale. She began a long career in linguistic fieldwork by studying various languages during the summer months.

Over the ten-year period from 1931 to 1941, Haas studied the Wakashan language Nitinat (Ditidaht), as well as a number of languages that were mainly originally spoken in the American Southeast: Tunica, Natchez, Muskogee (Creek), Koasati, Choctaw, Alabama, Cherokee and Hichiti. Her first published paper, A Visit to the Other World, a Nitinat Text, written in collaboration with Morris Swadesh, was published in 1933.

Shortly after, Haas conducted fieldwork with Watt Sam and Nancy Raven, the last two native speakers of the Natchez language in Oklahoma. Her extensive unpublished field notes have constituted the most reliable source of information on the now dead language. She conducted extensive fieldwork on the Muskogee language, and was the first modern linguist to collect extensive texts in the language. Her Muskogee texts were published after her death in a volume that was edited and translated by Jack B. Martin, Margaret McKane Mauldin, and Juanita McGirt.

=== Career at the University of California, Berkeley ===
During World War II, the United States government viewed the study and teaching of Southeast Asian languages as important to the war effort, and under the auspices of the Army Specialized Training Program at the University of California at Berkeley, Haas developed a program to teach the Thai language. Her authoritative Thai-English Students' Dictionary, published in 1964, is still in use.

In 1948, she was appointed assistant professor of Thai and Linguistics at the University of California, Berkeley Department of Oriental Languages, an appointment she attributed to Peter A. Boodberg, whom she described as "ahead of his time in the way he treated women scholars—a scholar was a scholar in his book". She became one of the founding members of the UC-Berkeley Department of Linguistics when it was established in 1953. She was a long-term chair of the department, and she was Director of the Survey of California Indian Languages at Berkeley from 1953 to 1977. She retired from Berkeley in 1977 and in 1984 was elected a Berkeley Fellow.

Mary Haas died at her home in Berkeley, California, on May 17, 1996, at the age of 86.

=== Role in teaching ===
Haas was noted for her dedication to teaching linguistics, and to the role of the linguist in language instruction. Her student Karl V. Teeter pointed out in his obituary of Haas that she trained more Americanist linguists than her former instructors Edward Sapir and Franz Boas combined: she supervised fieldwork in Americanist linguistics by more than 100 doctoral students. As a founder and director of the Survey of California Indian Languages, she advised nearly fifty dissertations, including those of many linguists who were later influential in the field, including William Bright (Karok), William Shipley (Maidu), Robert Oswalt (Kashaya), Karl Teeter (Wiyot), Catherine Callaghan (Penutian), Margaret Langdon (Diegueño), Sally McLendon (Eastern Pomo), Victor Golla (Hupa), Wick Miller (Acoma), Marc Okrand (Mutsun), Kenneth Whistler (Proto-Wintun), Douglas Parks (Pawnee and Arikara), and William Jacobsen (Washo).

== Awards and honors ==
In 1963, Haas served as president of the Linguistic Society of America. She was awarded a Guggenheim Fellowship in 1964. She was elected a fellow of the American Academy of Arts and Sciences in 1974, and she was elected to the National Academy of Sciences in 1978. She received honorary doctorates from Northwestern University in 1975, the University of Chicago in 1976, Earlham College, 1980, and the Ohio State University in 1980.

== Selected publications ==
- The Thai system of writing, 1943. American Council of Learned Societies.
- Spoken Thai, 1945 [co-authored with Heng R. Subhanka]. Linguistic Society of America.
- Thai reader, 1945, Berkeley.
- Tunica texts, 1950. University of California publications in linguistics, 6.1. Berkeley: University of California Press. 173pp.
- Thai vocabulary, 1955. American Council of Learned Societies. ISBN 978-0879502652
- The prehistory of languages, 1960. Mouton. [Reprint 2018] ISBN 9789027906816
- Thai-English student's dictionary, 1964. Stanford University Press. ISBN 978-0804705677
- Language, culture, and history : essays, 1978. Stanford University Press. ISBN 9780804709835
- Creek (Muskogee) texts, 2015. [co-authored with James H. Hill]. University of California Press. ISBN 9780520286429
