= Apalachee language =

Extinct Muskogean language of Florida, US

Apalachee
- Native to: United States
- Region: Florida
- Ethnicity: Apalachee
- Extinct: early 18th century
- Language family: Muskogean: Eastern; Apalachee

Language codes
- ISO 639-3: xap
- Glottolog: apal1237

Apalachee was a Muskogean language of Florida. It was closely related to Koasati and Alabama. Apalachee was found to belong to the same branch of the Muskogean family as Koasati, Alabama, and Hitchiti. Apalachee was originally spoken in western Florida, but is believed to have last been spoken in the nineteenth century by Apalachee people that had been removed to Louisiana.

== History ==
The language is known primarily from one document, a letter written in 1688 to Charles II of Spain. The original version of that letter is lost, but a copy published in 1860 survives. Additional Apalachee texts are said to have existed in archives in Havana but they have never been located.

The letter is accompanied by a loose Spanish translation, from which some aspects of Apalachee have been inferred. Related Muskogean languages have also been used to help understand the structure of Apalachee. Geoffrey Kimball produced a grammatical sketch and a vocabulary of the language based on these resources.

Apalachee is one of only three indigenous languages from its region to have any surviving documentation, alongside Timucua and Calusa.

== Phonology ==
=== Consonants ===
		Labial	Alveolar	Palatal	Velar	Glottal
Nasal		m	n			
Plosive	plain	p	t	tʃ	k ⟨c, g, q⟩	
Plosive	voiced	b				
Fricative	plain	f	s			h
Fricative	lateral		ɬ ⟨lz⟩			
Approximant		w ⟨gu, w⟩	l	j ⟨y⟩		

Orthography is only shown where it differs from the IPA.

=== Vowels ===
	Front	Central	Back
Close	i		
Close-mid			o
Open		a	

Vowels may also be elongated.

== Grammar ==
Apalachee relies on fixed word order (subject–object–verb) rather than case marking to specify the subject and object of a sentence. Apalachee does have some case markings, but does not rely on them to the same degree that other Muskogean languages do.

There is significant affixation in Apalachee morphology. Possession and pluralization are both marked by affixes on the noun. Objects can be marked on the verbs by prefixes. Derivational affixes are attested for both nouns and verbs, including distributive and causative markers.
