= Nancy Raven =

Last speaker of the Natchez language (1872–1957)

- Born: Nancy Chunestudy c. December 25, 1868; Indian Territory
- Died: March 25, 1957 (aged 88); Oklahoma
- Other name: Nancy Chunestudy Taylor Waters Raven
- Occupations: homemaker, storyteller, language consultant
- Known for: last fluent speaker of Natchez language

Nancy Raven (c. December 25, 1868–March 25, 1957), also known as Nancy Taylor, was a Natchez storyteller from Braggs, Oklahoma and one of the last two fluent speakers of the Natchez language.

Her father was Cherokee and her mother Natchez, and she learned Natchez at home. A full-blood Native American, she never learned English, but was trilingual in Natchez, Cherokee and Muscogee.

In 1907 she worked with anthropologist John R. Swanton who collected information about Natchez religion, and in the 1930s she worked extensively with linguist Mary R. Haas who collected grammatical information and texts using an interpreter. Among the stories she told Mary Haas was one called "The Woman Who Was a Fox". Sometimes she used the surname Taylor, which she had taken from her second husband.

== Family ==
She married four times. She had one son Adam Levi from her first marriage, with her second husband Will Taylor (Cherokee, d. 1905). She was soon widowed, then married a man named Waters, and by 1920 was again widowed and married Albert Raven, a man about whom little is known. In the 1930s she appears to have been once again widowed.

She was the biological cousin of the other last speaker of Natchez, Watt Sam (Natchez, 1876–1944), who in Natchez kinship terminology was her classificatory nephew. Among the Natchez, the language was generally passed down matrilineally, but at her death Nancy Raven had no surviving children, her only son Adam Levi having died from tuberculosis at age 20 in 1915.

== Allotment ==
In 1907, she received land allotments from the Cherokee Nation, divided into individual allotments by the Dawes Commission. In 1930 she sold her land allotment.
