= Pamela Munro =

American linguist (born 1947)

- Born: May 23, 1947 (age 79)

Academic background
- Education: University of California, San Diego
- Academic advisor: Margaret Langdon

Academic work
- Discipline: Linguist
- Sub-discipline: Native American languages
- Institutions: University of California, Los Angeles

Pamela Munro (born May 23, 1947) is an American linguist who specializes in Native American languages. She is a distinguished research professor emeritus of linguistics at the University of California, Los Angeles, where she has held a position since 1974.

She earned her PhD in 1974 from the University of California, San Diego, where her graduate adviser was Margaret Langdon. Her dissertation, titled Topics in Mojave Syntax, was published by Garland in 1976.

Her research has concentrated on all aspects of the grammars of indigenous languages of the Americas, most recently focusing on the Chickasaw (Muskogean; Oklahoma), Garifuna (Arawakan; Central America), Imbabura Quichua (Quechuan; Ecuador), Tongva (Uto-Aztecan; Los Angeles Basin), and Tlacolula Valley Zapotec (Zapotecan; Central Oaxaca, Mexico) languages. She has published numerous articles and books, and was instrumental in the creation of dictionaries for San Lucas Quiaviní Zapotec, Chickasaw and Wolof. She is also the compiler of a series of books on college slang, Slang U.

Munro was named to be the Ken Hale Professor at the 2019 LSA Linguistic Institute held at UC-Davis.

== Selected publications ==
- Chickasaw Language Committee, Joshua D. Hinson, John P. Dyson, and Pamela Munro, 2012. Anompilbashsha' Asilhha' Holisso: Chickasaw Prayer Book. Ada, OK: Chickasaw Press.
- Langacker, Ronald W. and Pamela Munro. 1975. "Passives and their meaning", Language 51: 789-830.
- Lopez, Felipe H., and Pamela Munro. 1998. The United Nations' Universal Declaration of Human Rights translated into San Lucas Quiaviní Zapotec.
- Lopez, Felipe H., and Pamela Munro. 1999. "Zapotec Immigration: The San Lucas Quiaviní Experience". Aztlan. 24, 1: 129-149.
- Munro, Pamela. 1976. Mojave Syntax. New York: Garland Publishing, Inc.
- Munro, Pamela and Lynn Gordon. 1982. "Syntactic relations in Western Muskogean: A typological perspective", Language 58: 81-115.
- Munro, Pamela. 1990. "Stress and vowel length in Cupan absolute nominals", IJAL 56: 217-50.
- Munro, Pamela. 1991. Slang U. Penguin Random House. ISBN 9780517582435
- Munro, Pamela. 1993. "The Muskogean II prefixes and their significance for classification", IJAL 59: 374-404.
- Munro, Pamela. 1996. "Making a Zapotec Dictionary". Dictionaries 17: 131-55.
- Munro, Pamela and Dieynaba Gaye. 1997. Ay Baati Wolof: A Wolof Dictionary.] UCLA Occasional Papers in Linguistics.
- Munro, Pamela. 1999. 'Chickasaw Subjecthood' in External Possession, Doris L. Payne and Immanuel Barshi (eds), Amsterdam: John Benjamins. 251-289.
- Munro, Pamela. 2002. "Hierarchical Pronouns in Discourse: Third Person Pronouns in San Lucas Quiaviní Zapotec Narratives". Southwest Journal of Linguistics 21: 37-66.
- Munro, Pamela. 2003. "Preserving the Language of the Valley Zapotecs: The Orthography Question." Presented at Language and Immigration in France and the United States: Sociolinguistic Perspectives. University of Texas.
- Munro, Pamela, et al. 2008. "Yaara' Shiraaw'ax 'Eyooshiraaw'a. Now You're Speaking Our Language: Gabrielino/Tongva/Fernandeño." Lulu.com.
- Munro, Pamela (editor); Susan E. Becker, Gina Laura Bozajian, Deborah S. Creighton, Lori E. Dennis, Lisa Renée Ellzey, Michelle L. Futterman, Ari B. Goldstein, Sharon M. Kaye, Elaine Kealer, Irene Susanne Veli Lehman, Lauren Mendelsohn, Joseph M. Mendoza, Lorna Profant, and Katherine A. Sarafian. 1991. Slang U. New York: Harmony Books. Excerpted as Pamela Munro, with Susan E. Becker, et al. "Party hats and pirates' dreams", Rolling Stone 600 (March 21, 1991): 67-69.
- Munro, Pamela and Dieynaba Gaye. 1997. Ay Baati Wolof: A Wolof Dictionary (Revised Edition), UCLA Occasional Papers in Linguistics 19.
- Munro, Pamela, Brook Danielle Lillehaugen and Felipe H. Lopez. 2007 Cali Chiu? A Course in Valley Zapotec.
- Munro, Pamela and Felipe H. Lopez, with Olivia V. Méndez, Rodrigo Garcia, and Michael R. Galant. 1999. Di'csyonaary X:tèe'n Dìi'zh Sah Sann Lu'uc (San Lucas Quiaviní Zapotec Dictionary/ Diccionario Zapoteco de San Lucas Quiaviní). Chicano Studies Research Center Publications, UCLA.
- Munro, Pamela and Catherine Willmond. 1994. Chickasaw: An Analytical Dictionary. Norman - London: University of Oklahoma Press.
- Saubel, Katherine Siva and Pamela Munro. 1981. Chem'ivillu' (Let's Speak Cahuilla). Los Angeles and Banning, CA: UCLA American Indian Studies Center and Malki Museum Press.
- Zigmond, Maurice L., Curtis G. Booth, and Pamela Munro. 1990. Kawaiisu: Grammar and Dictionary, with Texts. University of California Publications in Linguistics 119.
