= William R. Gruber =

- Born: December 17, 1890
- Died: January 27, 1979 (aged 88)
- Relatives: Edmund L. Gruber, (1879-1941), Brigadier general who wrote "The Caisson Song",
- Military career
- Allegiance: United States of America
- Branch: United States Army
- Service years: 1911–1946
- Rank: Brigadier general
- Nickname: "Bill"
- Unit: Field Artillery Branch
- Conflicts: World War I; Meuse-Argonne Offensive; Battle of Blanc Mont Ridge; World War II; China-Burma-India Theater
- Awards: Silver Star with Third Oak Leaf Cluster French Croix de guerre 1914–1918

William Rudolph Gruber, (December 17, 1890 – January 27, 1979) Brigadier general, was an instructor at the Army Command and General Staff School at Fort Leavenworth when Dwight D. Eisenhower was a student there. Following Eisenhower's graduation, Gruber and his wife Helen Drennan Gruber were joined by Dwight D. and Mamie Eisenhower on a 17-day, 1800 mile motor trip through Belgium, Germany, Switzerland and France in 1929.

They left Paris on August 28, 1929, and drove to Brussels, Belgium. Their route then took them to Bonn, Germany, south along the Rhine River to Coblenz, Heidelberg and through the Black Forest. They then went to Switzerland, spending seven days and visiting Zürich, Lucerne, Interlaken, Montreux, and Geneva, and surviving a harrowing crossing of the Furka Pass high in the Alps. From Switzerland the travelers went to Besançon, then to Romagne in France where they visited the American War Cemetery. While the ladies stayed to visit with a mutual friend, Gruber and Eisenhower toured the World War I battlefields in the area. Eisenhower was an expert guide having just completed work on a guidebook for the Battle Monuments Commission. The Grubers and Eisenhowers returned to Paris on September 13.
