= Archie Sam =

- Archie Sam in 1983 at the Grand Village of the Natchez in Natchez, Mississippi

Natchez-Cherokee-Muscogee Creek, enrolled United Keetoowah Band leader

Personal details
- Born: June 30, 1914 Greenleaf Mountain community
- Died: May 23, 1986 (aged 71)
- Spouse: Maudie Louise Quinton Sam
- Children: 2
- Education: Connors State College, Bacone College
- Known for: Traditionalist and cultural historian

Archie Sam (June 30, 1914 – May 23, 1986) was a Natchez-Cherokee-Muscogee Creek traditionalist, stomp dance leader, scholar, enrolled member of the United Keetoowah Band of Cherokee Indians, and the Sun Chief of the Natchez Nation.

== Early life and military service ==
Archie Sam was born in the Greenleaf Mountain community near Braggs, Oklahoma, on June 30, 1914. Archie was the youngest son of White Tobacco Sam, son of Creek Sam, and his mother was Aggie Cumsey, a fullblood Longhair clan Cherokee. Archie Sam was the grandnephew of Watt Sam, the last native speaker of the Natchez language.

Sam married Maudie Louise Quinton Sam, and the couple had two children.

Sam attended Bacone College in Muskogee and graduated from Connors State College in Warner. He then enlisted in the 45th Infantry Division and in 1940 he served overseas in World War II, participating in special missions at Thule Air Base in northern Greenland where he met and hunted with the Inughuit. After the war he transferred to the United States Air Force where he remained in the Air Force for 21 years before working for the United States Postal Service.

== Cultural work ==
In 1977 Sam worked with professor Charles Van Tuyl to recover sound recordings of Watt Sam that had been archived at the University of Chicago. These are the only known recordings of the Natchez language being spoken.

Upon retiring in 1971, he dedicated himself to the preservation of his indigenous heritage. He was a practitioner of native Natchez religion (Four Mothers Society), and in 1969 he revived the Medicine Springs ceremonial ground, located near Gore, Oklahoma.

== Death ==
Archie Sam died on May 23, 1986.
