= Watt Sam =

American Natchez storyteller (1876–1944)

- Watt Sam in 1908 holding a bow. From a series of photos taken by John R. Swanton, near Braggs, Oklahoma.
- Born: October 6, 1876
- Died: July 1, 1944 (aged 67)
- Resting place: Greenleaf Cemetery, Tahlequah, Oklahoma, U.S.
- Occupation: Cultural historian
- Known for: Being one of the last two native speakers of the Natchez language
- Relatives: Nancy Raven (cousin); Archie Sam (great-nephew)

Watt Sam (October 6, 1876 – July 1, 1944) was a Natchez storyteller and cultural historian of Braggs, Oklahoma and one of the two last native speakers of the Natchez language.

Around 1907 he worked with anthropologist John R. Swanton who collected information about Natchez religion. Swanton commented that Sam, having lived among the Cherokee and Creek his whole life and being fluent in both languages, had absorbed so much of their oral tradition that it was difficult to know the extent to which his stories reflected original Natchez tradition. For some of passages in the narratives that had sexual content, Swanton only provided a translation into Latin. In the 1930s he worked with linguist Mary Haas who collected grammatical information and texts. In 1931, anthropologist Victor Riste made several wax cylinder recordings of Watt Sam speaking the Natchez language, which were rediscovered at the University of Chicago in the 1970s by Archie Sam and linguist Charles Van Tuyl. One of the cylinders is now at the Voice Library at the University of Michigan.

He was the biological cousin of the other last speaker of Natchez, Nancy Raven, who in Natchez kinship terminology was his classificatory aunt, and through his father Creek Sam (b. 1825) he was the great-uncle of Natchez scholar Archie Sam. In some of his stories he used a register of Natchez that he referred to as "Cannibal language" in which he substituted some words with others. As among the Natchez the language was generally passed down matrilineally, Watt Sam did not teach the language to any of his children.

He is buried at the Greenleaf Cemetery at Tahlequah, Oklahoma.
