= Leanne Hinton =

American linguist (born 1941)

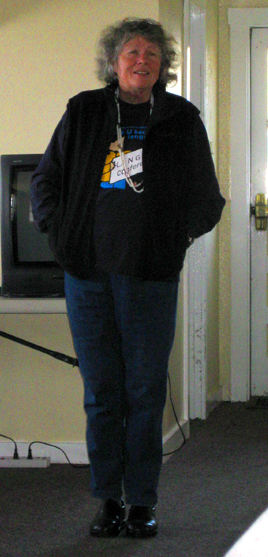
- Leanne Hinton speaking at an Advocates for Indigenous California Language Survival conference, 2008
- Born: 28 September 1941 (age 84); United States
- Education: PhD, University of California, San Diego (1977)
- Occupations: Linguist, Professor Emerita
- Years active: 1978–present
- Employer: University of California, Berkeley (Emerita)
- Known for: Language revitalization, American Indian languages, sociolinguistics
- Notable work: Bringing Our Languages Home, How to Keep Your Language Alive
- Awards: Cultural Freedom Award (2006), Language, Linguistics, and the Public award (2012)
- Website: Hinton's home page

Leanne Hinton (born 28 September 1941) is an American linguist and emerita professor of linguistics at the University of California, Berkeley.

== Education and career ==
Hinton received her PhD in 1977 from UC San Diego, with a dissertation entitled "Havasupai songs: a linguistic perspective," written under the supervision of Margaret Langdon. After joining the Berkeley faculty in 1978, Hinton began working with California languages.

Hinton specializes in American Indian languages, sociolinguistics, and language revitalization. She has been described as "an authority on how and why languages are being lost, the significance of language diversity, and the ways in which indigenous tongues can be revitalized before it's too late." "She first worked with Native American groups on bilingual education, orthographic design and literature development.

Hinton was a director of the Survey of California and Other Indian Languages (SCOIL), and participates in language revitalization efforts and organizations, including the Advocates for Indigenous California Language Survival and its biennial Breath of Life conferences, for which she is a consulting board member. In collaboration with Andrew Garrett, Hinton has also directed a project to digitize many of the SCOIL records, which are now available through the California Language Archive. Hinton was involved in the creation of the Master-Apprentice Language Learning Program while working with indigenous language speakers in California.

== Awards and achievements ==
In 2006, Leanne Hinton was awarded a Cultural Freedom Award, which honours individuals who support communities in upholding diversity, cultural freedom and creativity, from the Lannan Foundation.

In 2012, she was awarded the Language, Linguistics, and the Public award from the Linguistic Society of America.

== Published works ==
- Hinton, Leanne; Huss, Leena; Roche, Gerald. The Routledge Handbook of Language Revitalization. New York: Routledge. ISBN 978-1-138-67449-3.
- Hinton, Leanne (2013). Bringing Our Languages Home: Language Revitalization for Families. Berkeley: Heyday Books. ISBN 978-1597142007.
- Hinton, Leanne (2006). Sound Symbolism. Cambridge: Cambridge University Press. ISBN 978-0-521-02677-2.
- Hinton, Leanne (2002). How to Keep Your Language Alive. Berkeley: Heyday Books. ISBN 978-1-890771-42-3.
- Hinton, Leanne; Hale, Kenneth (2001). The Green Book of Language Revitalization in Practice. Brill. ISBN 978-90-04-25449-7.
- Hinton, Leanne (2000). Ishi's Tale of Lizard (1st ed.). Heyday Books. ISBN 1-890771-32-5.
- Hinton, Leanne (1998). Studies in American Indian Languages. Berkeley: University of California Press. ISBN 978-0-520-09789-6.
- Hinton, Leanne (1993). Flutes of Fire. Berkeley: Heyday Books. ISBN 978-0-930588-62-5.
- Hinton, Leanne (1984). Havasupai Songs: a Linguistic Perspective. City: John Benjamins Pub Co. ISBN 978-3-87808-356-6.
- Hinton, Leanne (1984). A Dictionary of the Havasupai Language. Havasupai Tribe. ASIN B0006YSJ6W
- Hinton, Leanne (1984). Spirit Mountain. Tucson: Sun Tracks and the University of Arizona Press. ISBN 978-0-8165-0817-4.
