= Paul Whitinui =

New Zealand sociology and education academic

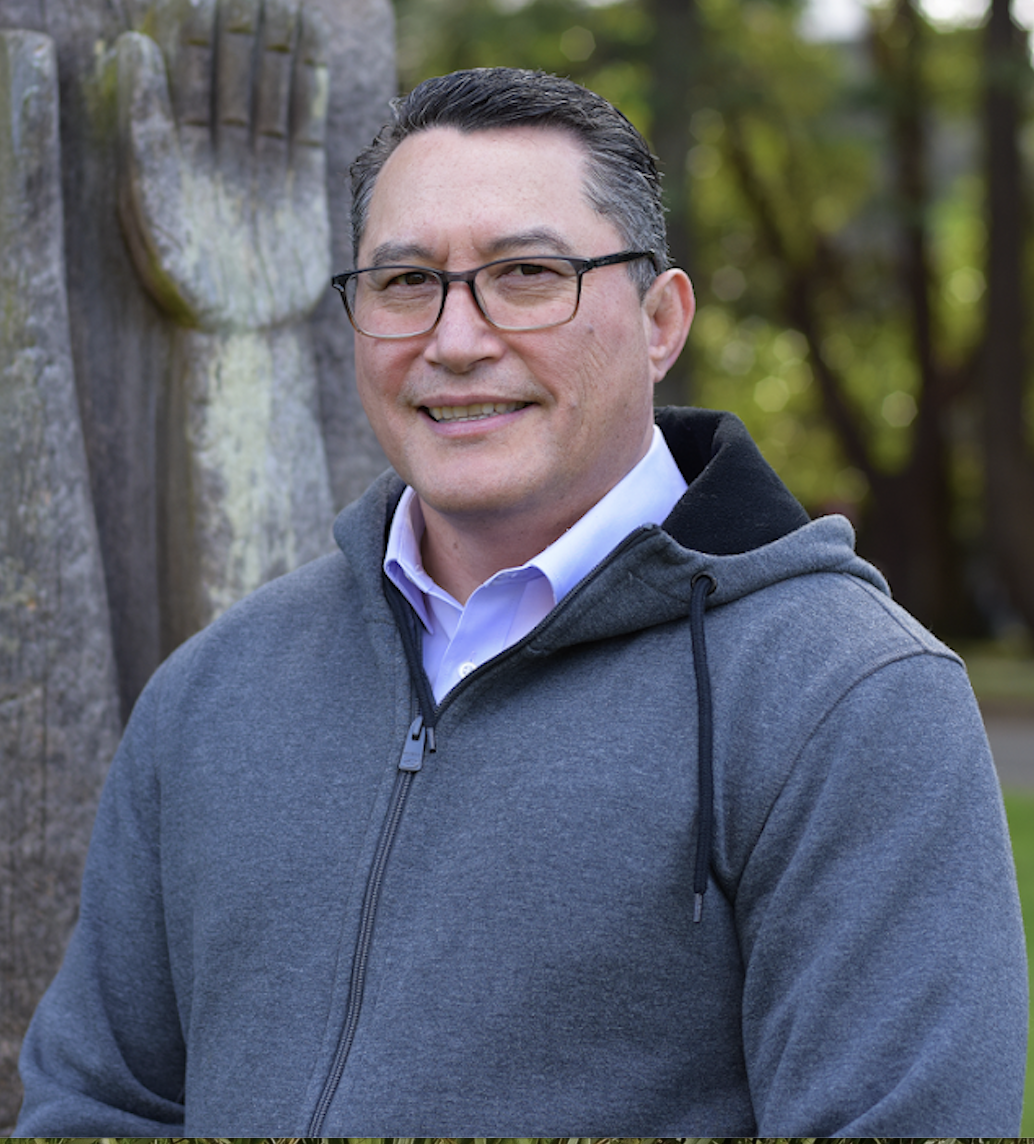
- Standing in front of a Lək̓ʷəŋən Peoples' totem at the University of Victoria, 2024
- Occupation: Professor
- Spouse: Onowa McIvor
- Awards: The Order of Service to Indigenous Education

Academic background
- Education: University of Waikato
- Thesis: The Indigenous Factor: Exploring Kapa Haka as a Culturally Responsive Learning Environment in Mainstream Secondary Schools in New Zealand (2007)

Paul Whitinui is a Canadian-New Zealand academic of Māori of Ngā Puhi, Te Aupōuri, Ngāti Kurī and European descent. In 2021, he was awarded The Order of Service to Indigenous Education from the World Indigenous Nations Higher Education Consortium (WINHEC) for his work advancing "First People’s engagement in education, research and authoring publications to raise awareness of issues within the wider community and in areas pertinent to human rights, wellbeing and social justice as it pertains to Indigenous Nations." He is a professor in the School of Exercise Science, Physical Health and Education at the University of Victoria in Victoria, British Columbia, Canada.

== Kapa Haka in education and national sport ==
Whitinui's early work is influential in developing national educational programs in New Zealand and elsewhere that are specifically relevant and meaningful to Indigenous students through performing Kapa Haka or other cultural rituals to build "interest, attendance, engagement, association and success" in student's lives. His work is quoted by New Zealand members of parliament as providing new research in the role of Indigenous language revitalization and its importance in cultural heritage.

Whitinui's research has been instrumental in showing how incorporating Māori ritual into education programs have a positive effect on learning experiences by having "validated their culture, boosted their confidence, nurtured their identity, and instilled pride in being Māori."

His writing also explores how Kapa Haka has been adopted and performed by the New Zealand National Union Rugby Team, the All Blacks, as a form of national unity that brings Maori ritual to contemporary sports: "The haka breathes life into what it means to be New Zealander. It also inspires us all to stand tall, unite and move forward together as a one nation, with one dream."

== Influence on Indigenous Education & Autoethnography ==
Whitinui is recognized as innovating new approaches to autoethnography through the use of bilingual Māori/English publishing and by introducing Māori concepts of whānau (family) to understand how individuals interact and live within community.

Whitinui is specifically mentioned in the Oxford Research Encyclopedia of Education for his work in developing "a model for a 'culturally explicit and informed' autoethnography with the capacity to nourish and replenish individuals and communities."

In Victoria, British Columbia, Whitinui is part of a group of educators who support the introduction of Indigenous languages into the general curriculum as a "step forward in the Truth and Reconciliation process."

== Indigenous Names in Sports Controversy ==
His is a commentator on the use of Indigenous names in sports teams and how to build respect and reconciliation in sports around Indigenous peoples and First Nations reclaiming "their rights, logos and brands and to not have them misappropriated or misrepresented.”

== Awards and recognition ==
2021: The Order of Service to Indigenous Education from the World Indigenous Nations Higher Education Consortium.

2017: As part of the 150 year anniversary of the founding of the Royal Society of New Zealand / Royal Society Te Apārangi, Whitinui's edited collection Kia Tangi te Tītī: Permission to Speak was recognized as part of Te Takarangi: Celebrating Māori publications with Ngā Pae o te Māramatanga
