= Margaret Langdon =

Belgian-American linguist (1926–2005)

- Langdon in 1971
- Born: Margaret Storms; April 24, 1926; Louvain, Belgium
- Died: October 25, 2005 (aged 79)
- Occupation: Linguist

Academic background
- Education: University of California, Berkeley (Ph.D., 1966)
- Doctoral advisor: Mary Haas

Academic work
- Notable students: Pamela Munro, Leanne Hinton
- Main interests: Languages of the American Southwest and California

Margaret Langdon (née Storms; April 24, 1926 – October 25, 2005) was a Belgian-American linguist who studied and documented many languages of the American Southwest and California, including Kumeyaay, Northern Diegueño (Ipai), and Luiseño.

== Academic career ==
Langdon (née Storms) was born in Belgium and immigrated to the United States following World War II. She grew up speaking French and Flemish. She earned her PhD in 1966 at the University of California, Berkeley under Mary Haas. Her doctoral thesis was a dictionary of the Mesa Grande dialect of Diegueño.

She taught at the Linguistics Department of the University of California, San Diego from 1965 to 1991, where she served as chair of the department from 1985 to 1988.

Langdon worked with various tribal elders throughout her career on southwestern languages. She compiled the first dictionary of the Mesa Grande language. She was a leading figure in the field of Yuman language studies.

== Teaching ==
She was an advisor to 17 graduate dissertations in linguistics, addressing such languages as Navajo, Palauan, Mojave, Havasupai, Seri, and others. Among her students at UCSD were linguists Pamela Munro, Leanne Hinton, Cheryl Hinton, Steve Elster, and Loni Langdon.

== Selected publications ==
- Langdon, Margaret. 1970. A Grammar of Diegueño: The Mesa Grande Dialect. University of California Publications in Linguistics 66. Berkeley.
- Langdon, Margaret. 1974. Comparative Hokan-Coahuiltecan Studies, a Survey and Appraisal. Janua Linguarum, Series Critica, 4. The Hague-Paris-New York: Mouton and Co.
- Langdon, Margaret. 1979. Some Thoughts on Hokan with Particular Reference to Pomoan and Yuman. In The Languages of Native America, Lyle Campbell and Marianne Mithun, eds., pp. 562–649. Austin and London: University of Texas Press, ISBN 9780292768529
- Langdon, Margaret. 1986. Hokan-Siouan Revisited. In New Perspectives in Language, Culture and Personality (Proceedings of the Edward Sapir Centenary Conference, Ottawa, 1-3 Oct. 1984), W Cowan, M.K. Foster, and K. Koemer, eds., pp. 111–146. Amsterdam/Philadelphia: John Benjamins Publishing Co.
- Langdon, Margaret. 1990. Morphosyntax and Problems of Reconstruction in Yuman and Hokan. In Linguistic Change and Reconstruction Methodology, Philip Baldi, ed., pp. 57–72. Trends in Linguistics, Studies and Monographs 45. Berlin-New York-Amsterdam: Mouton de Gruyter.
