= Honor Concept =

Part of the United States Naval Academy Honor Program

The Honor Concept and Honor Treatise are parts of the United States Naval Academy's Honor Program. Similar to the Cadet Honor Codes of the United States Military Academy and United States Air Force Academy, the Concept formalizes the requirement for midshipmen to demonstrate integrity while refusing to lie, cheat or steal.

The treatise adopts the use of first-person point of view, becoming a personal call to obey the letter and spirit of the concept amongst midshipmen of the brigade. The United States Coast Guard Academy and United States Merchant Marine Academy utilize a similar Honor Concept to impart the same call to integrity for its corps of cadets.

Unlike the other service academies' honor codes, the Honor Concept allows a midshipman to confront someone committing an honor violation without formally reporting it. At the other academies, failure to formally report an honor violation is construed as tolerating it, which is itself a violation of the code.

Penalties for violating the Honor Concept can be severe, up to and including expulsion from the Academy.

Midshipmen are persons of integrity: They stand for that which is right.

They tell the truth and ensure the truth is known. They do not lie.

They embrace fairness in all actions. They ensure that work submitted as our own is our own, and that assistance received from any source is authorized and properly documented. They do not cheat.

They respect the property of others and ensure that others are able to benefit from the use of their own property. They do not steal.

— Honor Concept, USNA Brigade Honor Program

== History ==
The principles of the Honor Concept are as old as the academy itself, revolving around the principle that an officer's word is his bond. However, examination of the past academy honor practices by 1953 USNA class president Ross Perot discovered "no uniform policy for dealing with midshipmen who had violated their class's conception of honor." While admitting to irreverence as an "inescapable trait of midshipmen," brigade leaders like Perot, William P. Lawrence and James Sagerholm worked with Brigade Captain Charles Dobony and academy superintendent Harry W. Hill to create the Honor Concept.
