= Edmund L. Gruber =

United States general (1879–1941)

Edmund Louis Gruber
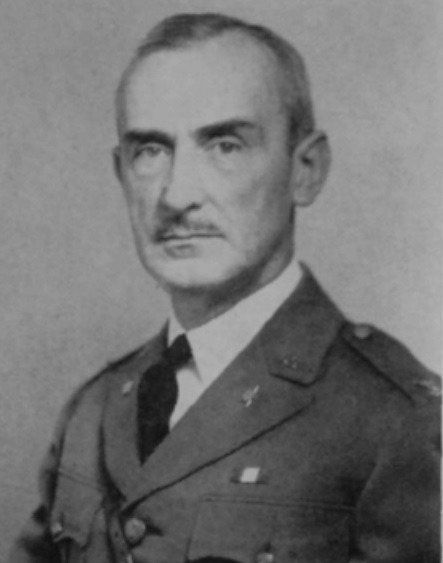
- From the April 1942 edition of Assembly magazine
- Born: November 11, 1879; Cincinnati, Ohio, U.S.
- Died: May 30, 1941 (aged 61); Fort Leavenworth, Kansas, U.S.
- Burial place: Arlington National Cemetery
- Relatives: William R. Gruber, brother, Brigadier general
- Military career
- Allegiance: United States
- Branch: United States Army
- Service years: 1904–1941
- Rank: Brigadier general
- Nickname: "Snitz"
- Commands: Commandant of the Command and General Staff College
- Conflicts: World War I
- Awards: Distinguished Service Medal

Field Artillery branch insignia, featuring two crossed field guns

Edmund Louis "Snitz" Gruber (November 11, 1879 – May 30, 1941) was an artillery officer and general in the United States Army who also gained popularity as composer of military music. He served as Commandant of the Command and General Staff College from October 1940 to May 1941.

== Life and career ==
Edmund Louis Gruber was born in Cincinnati, Ohio. His family had a musical background. His ancestor, Franz Gruber, composed the music to the classic Christmas song "Silent Night."

=== Promotions ===
Edmund Gruber attended the United States Military Academy, West Point, New York, from June 19, 1900, to June 15, 1904. He was commissioned a second lieutenant in the Artillery Corps. He was promoted to first lieutenant on January 25, 1907; to captain on July 1, 1916; to lieutenant colonel (temporary) on August 5, 1917; and to colonel (temporary) on July 30, 1918. He resigned from the Regular Army on October 28, 1919, and was reappointed as a major of Field Artillery on July 1, 1920. He was promoted to lieutenant colonel on January 7, 1929, to colonel on August 1, 1935, and to brigadier general (temporary) on October 1, 1940.

=== Service ===
He first served with Field Artillery units at Fort Riley at Junction City, Kansas; Fort Douglas, Utah; and the first Fort D.A. Russell (later called Fort Francis E. Warren) at Cheyenne, Wyoming, from 1904 to 1906. In February 1906 he sailed for the Philippine Islands where he served until April 1908. Returning to the United States, he was stationed at Fort Leavenworth at Leavenworth, Kansas, until the summer of 1908, when he was ordered to Fort Riley, Kansas, as a student officer at the mounted Service School. He was graduated in the summer of 1909, when he again was ordered to the Philippine Islands where he served at Fort William McKinley until April 1910.

Upon his return from the Philippine Islands, he was stationed for several months at the Presidio of San Francisco, California. He was then ordered to Germany as a student officer at the Imperial Military Riding School at Hanover. He served on that assignment until August 1912, when he was graduated. Returning to the United States, he was detailed to duty as an instructor in equitation at the Mounted Service School at Fort Riley, Kansas, until December 1912, when he joined the 5th Field Artillery at Fort Sill at Lawton, Oklahoma, with which regiment he served until July 1914. He again was assigned as an instructor at the Mounted Service School at Fort Riley, Kansas, until January 1915, when he rejoined the 5th Field Artillery at Fort Sill, where he was stationed until June 1915.

His next assignment was to the United States Military Academy, West Point, New York, as an instructor in the Department of Tactics, in which capacity he served until August 1917. He subsequent assignments during World War I included the command of the 332d Field Artillery at Camp Grant, Illinois, from August to December 1917; command of the 116th Field Artillery at Camp Wheeler at Macon, Georgia, from January to March 1918; duty as Assistant to the Chief of Field Artillery in Washington, D.C., from March to May 1918; command of the Field Artillery Brigade Firing Center at Fort Sill, Oklahoma, from May to October 1918; duty in the Office of the Chief of Field Artillery, Washington, D.C., in November 1918; and an assignment with the War Plans Division of the War Department General Staff, Washington, D.C., from December 1918 to October 1919.

Resigning on October 28, 1919, he became president and superintendent of the Kentucky Military Institute at Lyndon, Kentucky. He was re-commissioned in the Regular Army on July 1, 1920.

From December 1920 to July 1922 he was Assistant Commandant of the Field Artillery School at Fort Bragg at Fayetteville, North Carolina. The newly established school was expected to attract officers from all over the country to Camp Bragg, considered by artillerymen as the Army's best practice range. MAJ Gruber was Camp Bragg Commander from 1 February 1921 to 15 February 1921.

From August 1922 to July 1923, he was a student officer at the General Staff College at Fort Leavenworth, Kansas. Completing that course as a distinguished graduate, he was assigned to duty as an instructor at the Cavalry School at Fort Riley, Kansas, in which capacity he served until June 1926. He then was ordered to Washington, D.C., as a student officer at the Army War College. He was graduated in June 1927 and was ordered to Fort Leavenworth, Kansas, where he served for five years as instructor at the Command and General Staff School.

From September 1932 to June 1935, he served in the Panama Canal Zone at Forts Davis and Clayton. Returning to the United States in the summer of 1935 he was detailed to duty with the War Department General Staff, serving until September 1939. He was then ordered to Fort Ethan Allen at Essex Junction, Vermont, where in October 1939, he was assigned as Chief of the Artillery Section of the 1st Division. In October 1940 he became Commandant of the Command and General Staff School and Commanding General of the Seventh Corps Area, Fort Leavenworth, Kansas.

In the late evening hours of May 30, 1941, Gruber died unexpectedly during a game of bridge. He was cremated and his ashes were interred in the Arlington National Cemetery.

== Music ==
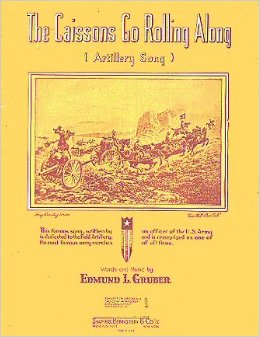
Song sheet crediting Gruber for "The Caissons Go Rolling Along."

Gruber was one of the most popular artillerymen of his time and was a noted Army polo team champion, but he made his enduring mark with music. In 1908, he wrote the 5th Artillery Regimental song, titled "The Caissons Go Rolling Along", also known as "The Caisson Song." "Caisson" is a reference to limbers and caissons—carts for transporting artillery pieces and artillery ammunition, respectively. Gruber's song was transformed into a march by John Philip Sousa in 1917 and entitled the "U.S. Field Artillery March." With revised lyrics by Harold W. Arberg, the song was adopted in 1956 as the official song of the United States Army and entitled "The Army Goes Rolling Along," which is typically called "The Army Song."

== Awards and honors ==
Edmund L. Gruber was awarded the Distinguished Service Medal, with the following citation: "He displayed exceptional ability in planning the organization of Field Artillery brigade firing centers; in April, 1918, established such a center at Fort Sill and during the remainder of the war displayed rare judgment and high professional attainments in the administration of this center."

In February 1942, as part of the War Department's build-up for World War II, an infantry training camp was constructed, near Braggs, Oklahoma. The camp was named "Camp Gruber," after General Edmund L. Gruber, who had served as an artillery officer at Fort Sill, Oklahoma for many years. Today Camp Gruber is a training center for the Oklahoma Army National Guard.

Fort Bragg also named one of its major roads after General Gruber.

== Sources ==
- XVIII Airborne Corps: Edmund L. Gruber Images and text used in this article were taken from the United States Army Center of Military History. They are presumed to be in the public domain.

Military offices
| Preceded by Horace H. Fuller | Commandant of the Command and General Staff College; October 1940 – May 1941 | Succeeded by Lesley J. McNair |
