= Andrew Garrett (linguist) =

American linguist (born 1961)

- Born: 1961 (age 64–65)

Academic background
- Education: Harvard University
- Thesis: The Syntax of Anatolian Pronominal Clitics (1990)

Academic work
- Discipline: Linguist
- Institutions: University of California, Berkeley

Andrew James Garrett (born 1961) is a professor of linguistics at the University of California, Berkeley.

He specializes in Indo-European languages and the languages of California, especially Yurok.

Garrett received his Ph.D. in linguistics from Harvard University in 1990, with a dissertation titled The Syntax of Anatolian Pronominal Clitics. He is a fellow of the Linguistic Society of America.

In collaboration with Leanne Hinton, Garrett has worked on a project to digitize many of the Survey of California and Other Indian Languages records, which are now available through the California Language Archive.

A 2015 paper co-authored by Garrett was recognized as the Best Linguistics Paper of the Year. Titled "Ancestry-constrained phylogenetic analysis support the Indo-European steppe hypothesis," (co-authored by Will Chang, David Hall, Chundra Cathcart), it elegantly showed that when methodological errors are corrected, phylogenetic analysis, which had earlier been used to suggest that the hypothesis was untenable, actually supports the time frame necessary for the hypothesis.

In 2023, Garrett published "The Unnaming of Kroeber Hall: Language, Memory, and Indigenous California," a critical examination of the complex legacies of early Californian anthropology and linguistics for twenty-first-century communities.

Garrett is married to another professor at Berkeley, Leslie Kurke.

== Awards ==
- 2007 Distinguished Teaching Award, bestowed by the Berkeley Division of the Academic Senate's Committee on Teaching

== Bibliography ==
- Andrew Garrett, Melissa Stoner, Susan Edwards, Jeffrey MacKie-Mason, Nicole Myers-Lim, Benjamin W. Porter, Elaine C. Tennant, and Verna Bowie, Native American collections in archives, libraries, and museums at the University of California, Berkeley (Office of the Vice Chancellor for Research, UC Berkeley, 2019)
- Will Chang, David Hall, Chundra Cathcart, Andrew Garrett, "Ancestry-constrained phylogenetic analysis supports the Indo-European steppe hypothesis,"Language, Vol. 91, No. 1 (MARCH 2015), pp. 194–244
- Basic Yurok (Berkeley: Survey of California and Other Indian Languages, 2014)
- Dianne Jonas, John Whitman, and Andrew Garrett, eds., Grammatical change: Origins, nature, outcomes (Oxford: Oxford University Press, 2012)
- Lisa Conathan, Andrew Garrett, and Juliette Blevins, compilers, Preliminary Yurok dictionary (Berkeley: Yurok Language Project, Department of Linguistics, UC Berkeley, 2005)
- Andrew Garrett, "The Unnaming of Kroeber Hall: Language, Memory, and Indigenous California" (MIT Press, 2023)
