= Natchez language =

Extinct indigenous language of Mississippi and Louisiana

Natchez
- Na·šceh
- Native to: United States
- Region: Louisiana, Mississippi, Oklahoma
- Ethnicity: Natchez
- Extinct: 1957, with the death of Nancy Raven
- Revival: 6 (2011)
- Language family: Language isolate or distantly related to Muskogean
- Dialects: Taensa; ?Avoyel

Language codes
- ISO 639-3: ncz
- Glottolog: natc1249
- ELP: Natchez
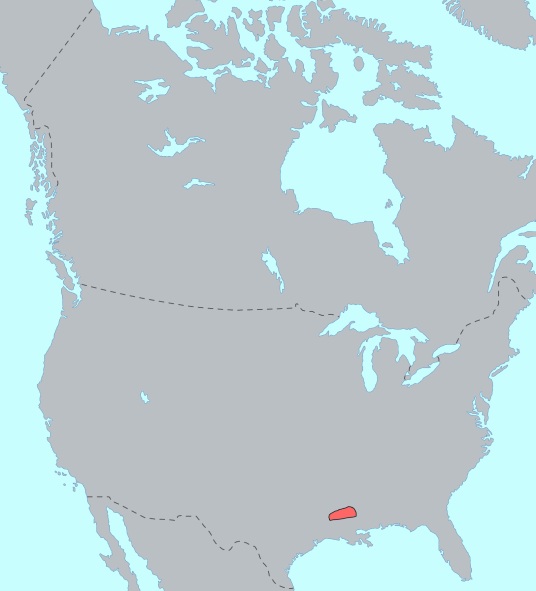
- Precontact distribution of the Natchez language

The Natchez language is the ancestral language of the Natchez people who historically inhabited Mississippi and Louisiana, and who now mostly live among the Muscogee and Cherokee peoples in Oklahoma. The language is considered to be either unrelated to other indigenous languages of the Americas or distantly related to the Muskogean languages.

The phonology of Natchez is atypical in having voicing distinction in its sonorants but not in its obstruents; it also has a wide range of morphophonemic processes. Morphologically, it has complex verbal inflection and a relatively simple nominal inflection (the ergative case marks nouns in transitive clauses), and its syntax is characterized by active-stative alignment and subject-object-verb word order (or more accurately Agent-Object-Verb and Subject-Verb). Natchez storytellers used a specific register, "cannibal speech", to impersonate cannibals, a recurring character in Natchez oral literature.

The Natchez chiefdom was destroyed in the 1730s by the French; Natchez speakers took refuge among their neighbors and accompanied them when the U.S. federal government forcibly removed them to Indian Territory (now Oklahoma) on the Trail of Tears. That meant that Natchez speakers were frequently multilingual in Muscogee, Cherokee, Natchez, and English. The language gradually became endangered, and it is now generally considered extinct in spite of recent revitalization efforts. Much of what is known of the language comes mostly from its last fluent speakers, Watt Sam and Nancy Raven, who worked with linguist Mary R. Haas in the 1930s.

The Natchez nation is now working to revive it as a spoken language. As of 2011, field linguists from the community were being trained in documentation techniques, and six members of the Natchez tribe in Oklahoma now speak the language, out of about 10,000.

== Classification ==
Table 1. Natchez-Muskogean cognate set from Kimball (2005)
Creek	fayhn-	"to flow"
Koasati	ho-fahna	"to flow"
Proto-Muskogean	*xʷaxna	
Natchez	waːn̥-haːʔiʃ	"to overflow"
Pre-Natchez	*wanxa	
Natchez-Muskogean	*xʷanaxa	"to flow"

The Natchez language is generally considered a language isolate. Mary Haas studied the language with Sam and Raven in the 1930s, and posited that Natchez was distantly related to the Muskogean languages, a hypothesis also accepted by Geoffrey Kimball, and initially proposed by John R. Swanton in 1924.

In 1941 Haas also proposed grouping Natchez with the Atakapa, Chitimacha, and Tunica languages in a language family to be called Gulf. This proposal is not widely accepted today by linguists.

Kimball (2005:402) presents the proposed cognate set in Table 1. as an example of the relation between Natchez and Muskogean languages with reconstructed intermediate forms.

== History ==
The Natchez people historically lived in the Lower Mississippi Valley. The ancestors of the Natchez are considered to be the Plaquemine culture, making the Natchez the last surviving group of the historical Mississippian chiefdoms of that area. The first mentions in historical sources come from the French who colonized the Mississippi Valley beginning around 1700, when the Natchez were centered around the Grand Village close to present day Natchez, Mississippi. The French and Natchez were first allied, but hostilities gradually broke out as colonists encroached on Natchez lands. The earliest sources for the Natchez languages are the chronicles of Antoine-Simon Le Page du Pratz, a French colonist who lived among the Natchez and learned their language. His chronicles contain examples of Natchez as it was spoken in the early 1700s. In 1729 the Natchez revolted, and massacred the French colony of Fort Rosalie, and the French retaliated by destroying all the Natchez villages. The remaining Natchez fled in scattered bands to live among the Chickasaw, Creek and Cherokee, whom they followed on the Trail of Tears when Indian removal policies forced them to relocate to Oklahoma between 1830 and 1850. In Oklahoma the language was mostly spoken in Abihka and Notchietown. Most Natchez speakers were multilingual, also speaking the Cherokee and Creek languages, and as traditionally the Natchez language was generally passed down matrilineally, this led to a decrease in Natchez speakers as Natchez, Muscogee and Cherokee speakers intermarried.

In 1907, when anthropologist John R. Swanton visited the Natchez, there were seven fluent speakers left, but in the 1930s, when linguist Mary R. Haas did her fieldwork, there were only two: Watt Sam (1876–1944) and Nancy Raven (1872–1957). In 1931, anthropologist Victor Riste made several wax cylinder recordings of Watt Sam speaking the Natchez language, which were later rediscovered at the University of Chicago in the 1970s by Watt Sam's nephew Archie Sam and linguist Charles Van Tuyl. These are the only known recordings of spoken Natchez. One of the cylinders is now at the Voice Library at Michigan State University.

Natchez is very little studied, apart from the work by Swanton and Haas and the early mentions by the French Chroniclers, Natchez has been discussed by Daniel Garrison Brinton who published an article "On the Language of the Natchez" in 1873, and is briefly mentioned by Albert Gallatin and Albert Pike. A vocabulary compiled based on the French sources was published by Charles van Tuyl in 1979. In the early 21st century linguistic work has been carried out by the linguist Geoffrey Kimball, who has worked based on Haas' notes and unpublished manuscripts.

== Phonology ==
Natchez has a relatively simple consonant inventory, but it stands out by having a voicing distinction in its sonorants but not in its obstruents, the opposite of most languages in the world.

		Bilabial	Alveolar	Palatal	Velar		Glottal
		Bilabial	Alveolar	Palatal	plain	labialized	Glottal
Stop		p	t		k	kʷ	ʔ
Affricate			t͡s				
Fricative				ʃ			h
Nasal	voiceless	m̥	n̥				
Nasal	voiced	m	n				
Approximant	voiceless		l̥	j̊		w̥	
Approximant	voiced		l	j		w	

There were six vowels, /i e a ə o u/, and a length distinction. Kimball (2005:394) treats vowel length as a separate phoneme because it can represent a morpheme, and because it may occur stem initially and segment away from the vowel that it lengthens. The sixth vowel, schwa, is a harmonizing vowel which is pronounced the same as the vowel in the preceding syllable. Natchez pronunciation has nasal vowels, but they are not phonemic, and originate from a previous word final /-n/.

	Front	Central	Back
Close	i		u
Mid	e	ə	o
Open		a	

Accent in Natchez is based on pitch rather than stress. Accent falls predictably on the penultimate syllable if it contains a long vowel, otherwise on the ante-penultimate. Accented short vowels are pronounced with high pitch, accented long vowels are pronounced with rising pitch, unaccented vowels have mid pitch, and certain forms such as imperatives and interrogatives have falling pitch.

== Grammar ==
toM na·šceh taʔa·.
/tom̥ naːʃt͡ʃeh ta-ʔaː/
person Natchez 1S.PAT-be
"I am Natchez"

- Watt Sam

Natchez has two basic word classes: nouns and verbs, and a number of minor categories such as deictics, particles and interjections. Adverbial and adjectival modifiers belong to the nominal word class. It has two classes of verbs, dependent and independent. Independent verbs have an invariant root and are inflected by means of prefixes and suffixes, whereas dependent verbs are not morphologically inflected but require auxiliary verbs for inflection. Most dependent verbs have four different root shapes depending on number of subject and object and number of times the action is repeated. Natchez has active-stative alignment. In active verbs the actor is indicated by an agreement prefix, whereas in stative verbs the actor is indicated by the same set of prefixes that indicate direct or indirect objects in active verbs.

=== Verbal inflection ===
The Natchez verb is highly complex and has the following morphological structure:

preverbs-subject-diminutive subject-aspect-dual subject-patient-patient type-plural subject-ROOT-dative object-dative-new topic-modal suffixes-postverbs

==== Preverbs ====
The morphological class of preverbs express temporal distinctions (future, past, pluperfect), as well as abilitative, directional and locative information, and also incorporates nouns. For example, the following verb form has two preverbs before the verb root, nok "can", and kin "something":

nokkinhanta:wã:
nok-kin-han-ta-w-a:-~
can-something-make-i-incompletive-phrasal.termination
"I can work"

==== Subject prefixes ====
One set of prefixes simultaneously encode person of intransitive subject and temporal, modal and epistemic information. The prefixes occur in two forms with either the vowel a or the vowel e, and some verbs take a-forms and others e-forms. Table 3. gives the subject prefixes for the indefinite forms and for the present tense. Other sets are the past, optative, participial and hearsay forms. This gives the following kind of inflection of intransitive verbs.

Table 3. "Subject prefixes"
tense/mode/person	A-set	E-set
Indefinite	ha-	he-
Present first	ta-	te-
Present second	pan-	pen
Present third	na-	ne-

ha-hkuʃi-ʔiʃ "to drink"
ta-hkuʃãː "I drink"
pana-hkuʃãː "you drink"
na-hkuʃãː "he/she/it drinks"

The past and optative forms are formed by using their respective sets of subject prefixes (past first person ya-/ye-, second person pu-/pi-, third person ʔi-; optative: first ʔa-/ʔe-, second paː-/peː-, third ʔaː-/ʔeː-).

ya-hkuʃãː "I drank"
pu-hkuʃãː "you drank"
ʔi-hkuʃãː "he/she/it drank"

The dual is formed by adding the prefix tani-/teni- and the plural with the prefix pi-:

ta-pani-hkuʃãː "we two drink"
ta-pi-hkuʃãː "we drink"

Participial forms take the prefixes ʔi-:

ʔi-hkuʃi "drinking, drunk"

==== Aspect affixes ====
There are three aspect prefixes, -n- imperfect (only recorded with the hearsay prefix), and -ʃə- pluperfect, and -ʃen- "ought" (deontative). The pluperfect prefix requires the preverb -ka-. The "deontative" affix requires the use of the preverb yaː- and the present tense form of the verb.

An example of the use of aspect affixes is:

ʔok-ʃe-n-ʃku-k
stick.on-hearsay-imperfect-auxiliary-connective
"and he was sticking them on himself (they say)"

==== Objects ====
Direct and indirect objects are marked on the verb with a series of affixes that immediately precede the root. The object affixes are first person -n-/-ni-; second person -p-/-pi- and for the third person either Ø or ī. The affixes only mark for person, not for number of the object. In independent verbs plural object is marked with the affix -ːpi-, in dependent verbs a plural object is marked by a change in the root shape. An affix -li- indicates a diminutive object.

This is an example of the use of the object prefix (object affix in bold):

taː-ʔa-ni-l-k
kill-third.person.optative-first.person.object-auxiliary-connective
"let her kill me and..."

Dative objects are marked with a suffix that immediately follows the verb root, and which is itself always followed by a dative suffix -ʃi. As the other object affixes they mark only person not number. The dative object suffixes are: first person: -(i)t-; second person -p(i)-; third person -Ø-. Combined with the dative suffix they take the following form: first: -t͡si-/-it͡si=, second: -pʃi-/-piʃi-, third -ʃi-. A text example with the dative suffixes in bold is:

maː-leːheːpaːlit͡sṵ
maː-leːheː-paː-l-it-ʃi-u-~
future-leave.plural/plural-second.person.optative-auxiliary-first.person.dative-dative-modal-phrasal.termination
"You will leave it here for us"

Here the plural dative object is implied by the plural form of the verb root.

==== Modal suffixes ====
There are about 20 different suffixes with verbal modificational meanings (including information about tense and aspect) such as interrogative, diminutive, focus, negative, completive, habitual, "but", "when", "and" (connective), future, "still", "keep on", "might". etc.

=== Dependent verbs ===
Dependent verbs are formed by prefixing the dependent verb root to one of about 40 different auxiliary elements. Each auxiliary element has a vague meaning but some have meanings such as "transitive" -halʔiʃ, "reciprocal" -hetahnuːiʔʃ, "intransitive" -hakiʔiʃ, "involuntary action" -hektiʔiʃ.

taː -halʔiʃ
get.drunk -AUX
"he gets drunk"

Dependent verbs inflect only for pluralization, but do so in complex ways. The stem may reduplicate to mark a singular subject and plural object or repeated action by singular subject, it may add the suffix -ə- to mark a plural subject and a singular object or action by plural subject, and -əːhəː- to mark a plural subject with a plural object.

taː -taː -halʔiʃ
get.drunk -REDUP -AUX
"he gets drunk repeatedly"

taː -əːhəː -halʔiʃ
get.drunk -PL.SUBJ -AUX
"they get drunk"

=== Nominal morphology ===
Noun morphology is entirely suffixing, and the nominal complex has the following structure:

ROOT-diminutive-augmentive-possessive-verbal diminutive-modifier-ergative-article-case

==== Diminutives ====
The diminutive is formed by adding the suffix -ːnuh-/-iːnuh-.

naːʃt͡seh "Natchez person"
naːʃt͡senuh "Natchez child"

==== Possession ====
Possession is marked with a suffix that agrees with the possessor. The singular possessive suffixes are: First person -niʃ "my"; Second person -piʃ "your"; and third person (ʔ)iʃ "his/her/its".

kitah "friend"
kitahniʃ "my friend"
kitahpiʃ "your friend"
kitahiʃ "his/her friend"

Plural and dual possessors are formed by using a restrictive relative clause with the verb haːʃiʔiʃ "to exist for someone (to have)".

kitah nataniːt͡siya (Lit. "the friend who exists for the two of us") "Our (dual) friend"
kitah napiːʃiya (Lit. "the friend who exists for them") "their (pl.) friend".

==== Ergative/Absolutive ====
The ergative/instrumental case, used to mark the agents of transitive verbs (as well as instruments and some locatives), is marked by a suffix with the form -t͡s/-it͡s.

ʔakʷenuht͡sa hokʃaɬ
ʔakʷenuh-t͡sa hok-ʃa-ɬ
opossum-ergative-article skin-hearsay-auxiliary-connective
"opossum skinned him and..."

==== Modifiers ====
There are a number of noun modifying suffixes such as the decessive (used to refer to deceased persons, or persons who have changed into something else), the comparative and the "exclusive". The following example shows the use of the decessive modifier with the morpheme in bold face.

tamaːɬ-iː-ya-n
woman-decessive-article-absolutive
"the former woman" (about a woman who has been magically transformed into a man)

=== Syntax ===
The most common constituent orders are "Subject-Verb" (for intransitive verbs) and "Agent-Verb" (for transitive verbs), "Direct.Object-Verb" and "Agent-Direct.Object-Verb. But the order "Direct.Object-Agent-Verb" does also occur in constructions with object focus. Agent-Verb-Direct.Object, a construction with focus on the verb, also occurs, albeit very infrequently.

==== Stative verbs ====
Stative verbs are verbs that do not imply willful control of the action by its subject. They tend to be intransitive and the subject tends to be marked by the absolutive case. One group of stative verbs, called "direct impersonal verbs" by Haas, use the object prefixes to mark the subject, and another group, "indirect impersonal verbs", use the prefixes that are otherwise used to refer to indirect objects or benefactives. There are a few transitive stative verbs such as the dependent verb ʔim̥- "to be tired of something".

=== Discourse styles ===
==== Cannibal speech ====
Natchez oral literature has been documented by John R. Swanton and Mary Haas, both of whom worked with Watt Sam in 1907 and the mid 1930s, respectively. Traditionally the Natchez had certain stories that could only be told during the winter time, and many of these stories revolved around the theme of cannibalism. Protagonists in such stories would encounter cannibals, trick cannibals, marry the daughters of cannibals, kill cannibals, and be eaten by cannibals. In these stories Natchez storytellers would employ a special speech register when impersonating the cannibal characters. This register was distinct from ordinary Natchez by substituting several morphemes and words for others.

Table 4. "Cannibal Speech Vocabulary"
Cannibal word	Standard Natchez word	meaning
ʔaʃa-hakiʔiš	pakaʃ-hewʔiʃ	"to howl (of a wolf)"
yaːʃ	ʔakʷenuh	"opossum"
waːle-halʔiʃ	ʔen̥pat͡s-haɬsiʔiʃ	"to fish"

In this example the standard optative prefix -ʔa- is exchanged for the cannibal register optative prefix -ka-

kapiʃkʷãː
ka-pi-ʃkʷ-aː-n
first.person.optative.(cannibal)-pl-eat-incompletive-phrasal.termination
"Let us [cannibals] eat him!"

Table 4. shows some of the lexical substitutions charactering Natchez cannibal speech.
