= The Army Goes Rolling Along =

Official march of the United States Army

- Organizational anthem of the U.S. Army
- Also known as: "The Army Song"
- Lyrics: Harold W. Arberg, November 1956
- Music: Edmund L. Gruber, 1908
- Adopted: November 11, 1956; 70 years ago

Audio sample
- Performed by the U.S. Army Band: file; help

"The Army Goes Rolling Along" is the official song of the United States Army and is typically called "The Army Song". It is adapted from an earlier work from 1908 entitled "The Caissons Go Rolling Along", which was in turn incorporated into John Philip Sousa's "U.S. Field Artillery March" in 1917.

== History ==
The original version of this song, written in March 1908 by Edmund L. Gruber, was titled "The Caissons Go Rolling Along." Those lyrics differ from the current official version. Gruber's version was transformed into a march by John Philip Sousa in 1917 and renamed the "U.S. Field Artillery March."

In 1944 the U.S. Circuit Court of Appeals upheld a previous Federal Court ruling that Gruber, though he had permitted the song to be included in a 1921 compilation of West Point songs, had never formally copyrighted the work.

The United States Navy, Marine Corps, Air Force, and Coast Guard had adopted official songs, and the Army was eager to find one of its own. They conducted a contest in 1948 to find an official song, but no entry received much popular support. In 1952, Secretary of the Army Frank Pace asked the music industry to submit songs; he received more than 800 entries. "The Army's Always There" by Sam H. Stept won, and an Army band performed it at President Dwight D. Eisenhower's inaugural parade on January 20, 1953.

Many thought that the melody was too similar to "I've Got a Lovely Bunch of Coconuts". The Army decided to use much of the melody from Sousa's "U.S. Field Artillery March" with new lyrics. Harold W. Arberg, a music advisor to the Adjutant General, submitted lyrics that the Army adopted. Secretary of the Army Wilber Marion Brucker dedicated the music on Veterans Day, November 11, 1956. The song is played after most U.S. Army ceremonies, and all soldiers are expected to stand at attention and sing. When more than one service song is played, they are played in the order specified by Department of Defense directive: Army, Marine Corps, Navy, Air Force, Space Force, and Coast Guard.

In 2013, U.S. Army chief of staff Ray Odierno issued an order restoring the original version of "The Army Goes Rolling Along," consisting of a "short introduction, then the verse, followed by the chorus and then the refrain."

== Lyrics (common version) ==
The following lyrics are to "The Army Goes Rolling Along." Typically, only the verse, first chorus and refrain are sung at official ceremonies. Effective May 8, 2013, All Army Activities enforced an order declaring that "(The Army Song) will begin with a short introduction, then the verse, followed by the chorus and then the refrain."

Verse:

March along, sing our song, with the Army of the free
Count the brave, count the true, who have fought to victory
We're the Army and proud of our name
We're the Army and proudly proclaim

First Chorus:

First to fight for the right,
And to build the Nation's might,
And the Army goes rolling along
Proud of all we have done,
Fighting 'til the battle's won,
And the Army goes rolling along.

Refrain:

Then it's Hi! Hi! Hey!
The Army's on its way.
Count off the cadence loud and strong
For where e'er we go,
You will always know
That the Army goes rolling along.

== Lyrics (Full version) ==
The following lyrics are to the full version "The Army Goes Rolling Along." The original song was rewritten in 1956 to include more lyrics. However, the main lyrics of the song would later be officially shortened to the original version in 2013. The full version's extended lyrics with the second and third choruses are not commonly sung at ceremonies, with any use of the song beyond "a short introduction, then the verse, followed by the chorus and then the refrain" discouraged.

Verse:

March along, sing our song, with the Army of the free
Count the brave, count the true, who have fought to victory
We're the Army and proud of our name
We're the Army and proudly proclaim

First Chorus:

First to fight for the right,
And to build the Nation's might,
And the Army goes rolling along
Proud of all we have done,
Fighting 'til the battle's won,
And the Army goes rolling along.

Refrain:

Then it's Hi! Hi! Hey!
The Army's on its way.
Count off the cadence loud and strong
For where e'er we go,
You will always know
That the Army goes rolling along.

Second Chorus:

Valley Forge, Custer's ranks,
San Juan Hill and Patton's tanks,
And the Army went rolling along
Minutemen, from the start,
Always fighting from the heart,
And the Army keeps rolling along.

(Refrain)

Third Chorus:

Men in rags, men who froze,
Still that Army met its foes,
And the Army went rolling along.
Faith in God, then we're right,
And we'll fight with all our might,
As the Army keeps rolling along.

(Refrain)

== In popular culture ==
- The tune was used in 44 movies or television series from 1934 to 2011.
- Robert A. Heinlein used the 1908 Caisson Song as the basis for "The Road Song of the Transport Cadets", the official song of the fictional United States Academy of Transport in his 1940 short story "The Roads Must Roll". Characters in the story refer to the origin as both the "Song of the Caissons" and the "field artillery song."
- Hasbro used the tune for its G.I. Joe toyline during the 1960s with the words "G.I. Joe...G.I. Joe...fighting man from head to toe...on the land...on the sea...in the air."
- In the 1960s, the Hoover Company used this tune for the promotion of their "Hoover Junior" vacuum cleaner with the lyrics "All the fluff, dust and grit. Hoover gets at every bit. For it beats as it sweeps as it cleans".
- In 1962, the song was parodied in The Jetsons Season 1, Episode 6, "The Good Little Scouts." It was the marching song of Elroy Jetson's space troop.
- In 1962, Mad Magazine did a version about the card game Contract bridge.
- In The Muppet Show episode Juliet Prowse, when Kermit asks the Muppet Glee Club to sing something, the Glee Club all sing a bunch of different songs in unison, and one frog sings The Army Goes Rolling Along.
- In 1979, the song was sung by Margaret Houlihan in M*A*S*H Season 7, Episode 16 (titled "The Price") while she was in the shower. It is also partially sung in Season 3 Episode 19 (titled "Aid Station") by Margaret, Hawkeye Pierce, and Max Klinger as they arrive back at their unit, M*A*S*H 4077th. In Season 6 Episode 16, Margaret loses her wedding ring, which is inscribed with "Over hill, over dale, our love will never fail," inspired by the original lyrics to "The Caisson Song." Hawkeye and BJ get a tinker to inscribe an identical ring, but the inscription is humorously misspelled as "Over hill, over dale, our love will ever fail."
- The fight song of North Carolina State University is a sped-up version of the tune. (See NC State Wolfpack.)
- The Australian A-League Club Adelaide United FC uses the tune for their club song "United Is Rolling Along."
- A version of the song is in the Girls und Panzer Original Soundtrack, under the title "America Yahoutai March."
- The Barney & Friends version used "The Rocket Song," which can be found in Barney in Outer Space and other Barney episodes and videos.
- Tom Lehrer references the late 1940s-mid 1950s contest that eventually resulted in the adoption of the song in a spoken-word section on his 1959 album An Evening Wasted With Tom Lehrer. Lehrer discusses the contest to introduce his song "It Makes a Fellow Proud to Be a Soldier", which satirizes the Army of the 1950s from the perspective of a young conscript by humorously suggesting he had submitted it for consideration as the Army song.
- This song is sung by Goofy, Chip 'n' Dale, Christian Buenaventura, Michelle Montoya, Toby Ganger, and Brandon Hammond in Mickey's Fun Songs: Campout at Walt Disney World.
- The Kidsongs Kids sing this song in "A Day At Camp". In that same series, the song "The Circus is Coming to Town" is set to the song's tune.
- In Army Wives season 4, episode 9, Frank Sherwood and General Michael J. Holden sing to Sara Elizabeth Burton.

== See also ==
- "Marines' Hymn"
- "The U.S. Air Force"
- "Anchors Aweigh"
- "Semper Paratus"
- "Semper Supra"
