= Academic honor code =

Ethical principles governing U.S. academia

An academic honor code or honor system in the United States is a set of rules or ethical principles governing an academic community based on ideals that define what constitutes honorable behaviour within that community. The use of an honor code depends on the notion that people (at least within the community) can be trusted to act honorably. Those who are in violation of the honor code can be subject to various sanctions, including expulsion from the institution. or in other words, honor code is like a pledge taken by students to the effect that they will uphold academic integrity and ethical behavior and will not engage in any kind of cheating, stealing, and misrepresentation. One of the first such codes was created at the College of William & Mary in the early 18th Century.

== US military service academies ==
Presently, some of the most notable and most stringent honor codes exist at the Federal Service Academies and Senior Military Colleges.

The military academy honor codes not only govern the cadets and midshipmen's lives at the academies but also are deemed essential to the development of military officers who are worthy of the public trust. As such, the codes are not limited merely to academic situations or to conduct on campus; cadets and midshipmen are expected to live by the codes' ethical standards at all times. The codes are as old as the academies themselves and simply state that cadets and midshipmen do not lie, cheat or steal, nor tolerate those who do. A single-sanction Honor Code, in which any offense results in expulsion regardless of severity, exists at Virginia Military Institute, which features a "drum out" ceremony which is still carried out upon a cadet's dismissal. Outside of the military, Washington and Lee University has a single sanction code.

At three of the service academies and at Virginia Military Institute, anyone who learns of an honor code violation is required to report it. Failure to do so is considered "toleration," which itself violates the code. That also holds true at schools with combined cadet and traditional student programs, such as Norwich University, Texas A&M, and The Citadel, whose honor codes specifically provide that all students, both cadets and civilians, do not "tolerate those who do." It is notable that the three Senior Military Colleges have two honor codes, one for cadets and one for civilians, whether on-campus or through distance online programs, etc. The Honor Concept of the Brigade of Midshipmen at the United States Naval Academy allows the observer of an honor violation to confront the accused without formally reporting. It was found that it was more constructive at developing the honor of midshipmen. A non-toleration clause, on the other hand, is believed to make enemies of classmates. Additionally, it is thought that one's true honor, if other than utmost, was not able to be formally remediated when hidden from public view. Under the academies' honor codes, violators can face severe punishment, up to being forwarded for expulsion by the Secretary of the Army, Navy, or Air Force.

Stringent honor codes, however, are not limited to military institutions. The all-male Hampden–Sydney College is reputed for an honor code system on a par with military systems, which extends to all student activities both on and off campus (off-campus violations can be prosecuted), and also like the military system, it considers tolerance of a violation itself a violation. Like the Naval Academy, however, those who witness a violation are encouraged to confront the violator and convince them to turn themselves in before resorting to reporting the violation. Another school with a very strict honor code is Brigham Young University. The university not only mandates honest behavior but also incorporates various aspects of Mormon religious law: drinking, smoking, drug use, premarital sex and same-sex relationships are all banned. Also, the code includes standards for dress and grooming. Men must be clean-shaven, and men and women cannot wear short shorts or other revealing clothing.

== See also ==
- Ethical code
- Warrior code
