= U.S. Field Artillery March =

Musical composition by John Philip Sousa, based on an earlier work by Edmund L. Gruber

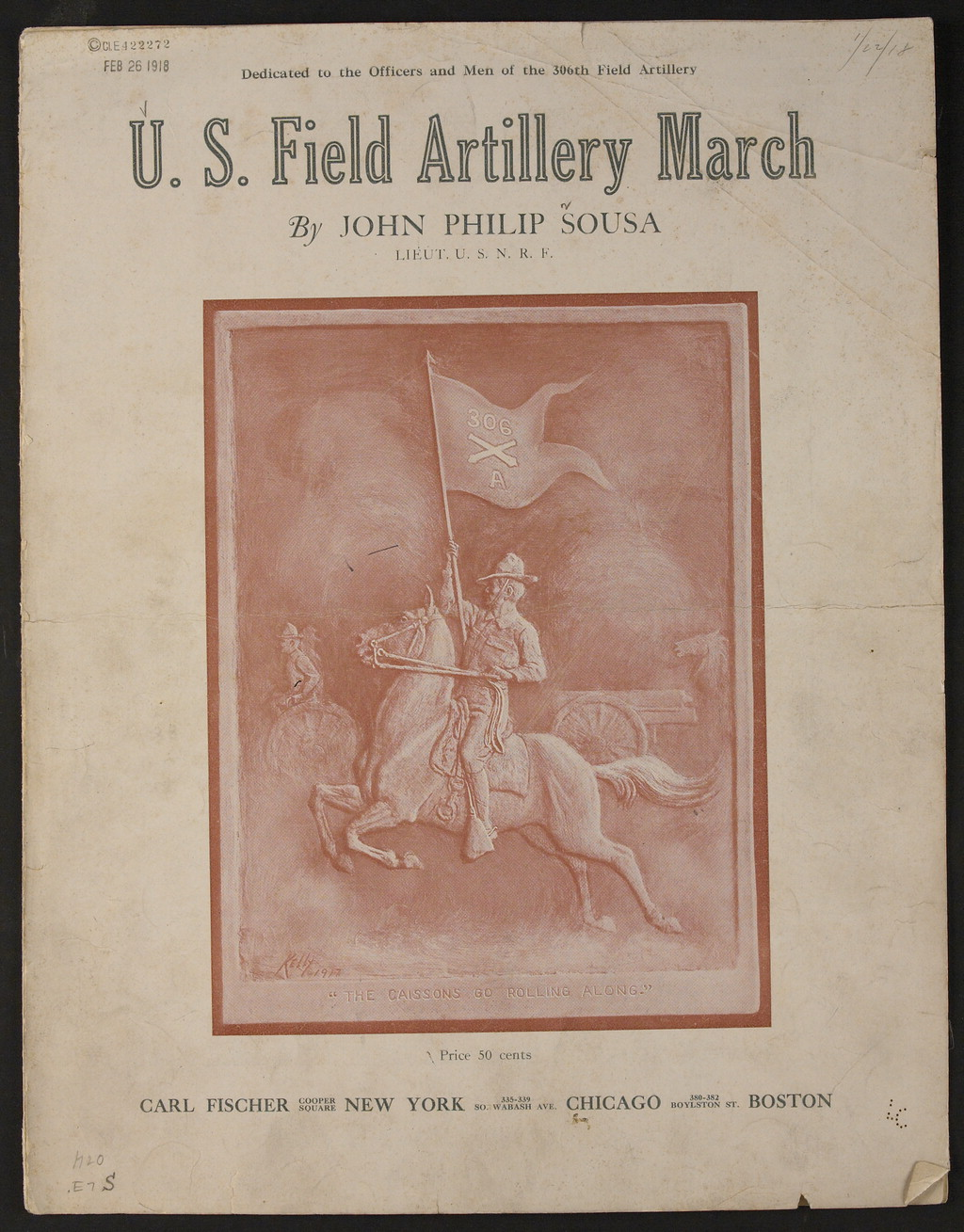
Sheet music cover for the song "U.S. Field Artillery March" by Sousa

The United States Field Artillery
The "U.S. Field Artillery March" played in 1944 by the Boston Pops

The United States Field Artillery
Music (without lyrics) performed in 2004 by the United States Marine Band (2:13)

The "U.S. Field Artillery March" is a patriotic military march of the United States Army written in 1917 by John Philip Sousa after an earlier work by Edmund L. Gruber. The refrain includes the phrase "caissons go rolling along", a reference to limbers and caissons—carts for transporting artillery pieces and artillery ammunition, respectively. This song inspired the official song of the U.S. Army, "The Army Goes Rolling Along".

== Background ==
Sousa served in the United States Marine Corps, and was a member of the U.S. Navy during World War I. He was asked by Army Lieutenant George Friedlander, of the 306th Field Artillery, to compose a march for his regiment. Friedlander suggested it be built around a song already known as "The Caisson Song" (alternatively "The Field Artillery Song" or "The Caissons Go Rolling Along"). The song was thought to perhaps be of Civil War origin, and was unpublished, and its composer believed to be dead. Sousa agreed, changed the harmonic structure, set it in a different key, refined the melody, made the rhythm more snappy, and added further new material.

Sousa and Lieutenant Friedlander were surprised to later learn that the composer of "The Caisson Song" was still living and that the song had been written in 1908 by artillery First Lieutenant (later Brigadier General) Edmund L. Gruber, with some help on the lyrics from Lieutenant William Bryden, and Lieutenant (later Major General) Robert M. Danford, while stationed at Fort Stotsenburg in the Philippines. Reportedly, Gruber may have been influenced by music composed by Alfred C. Montin at Fort Sheridan in Illinois, shortly before his unit was transferred to Fort Sill in Oklahoma.

It appears that Gruber did not object to Sousa's use of the song, at least not initially, and that Sousa passed on his royalties to Gruber. However, other sources state that Gruber became involved in a prolonged legal battle to recover the rights to the music he had written and that had been lifted (unknowingly or not) by Sousa and widely sold by sheet music publishers who reaped profits while Gruber received nothing. The music became so popular that it was also used in radio ads by firms such as the Hoover Vacuum Company. Gruber's position was rejected by the courts in 1942, which ruled that he had waited too long to complain and that his music was by that time in the public domain.

== Lyrics ==
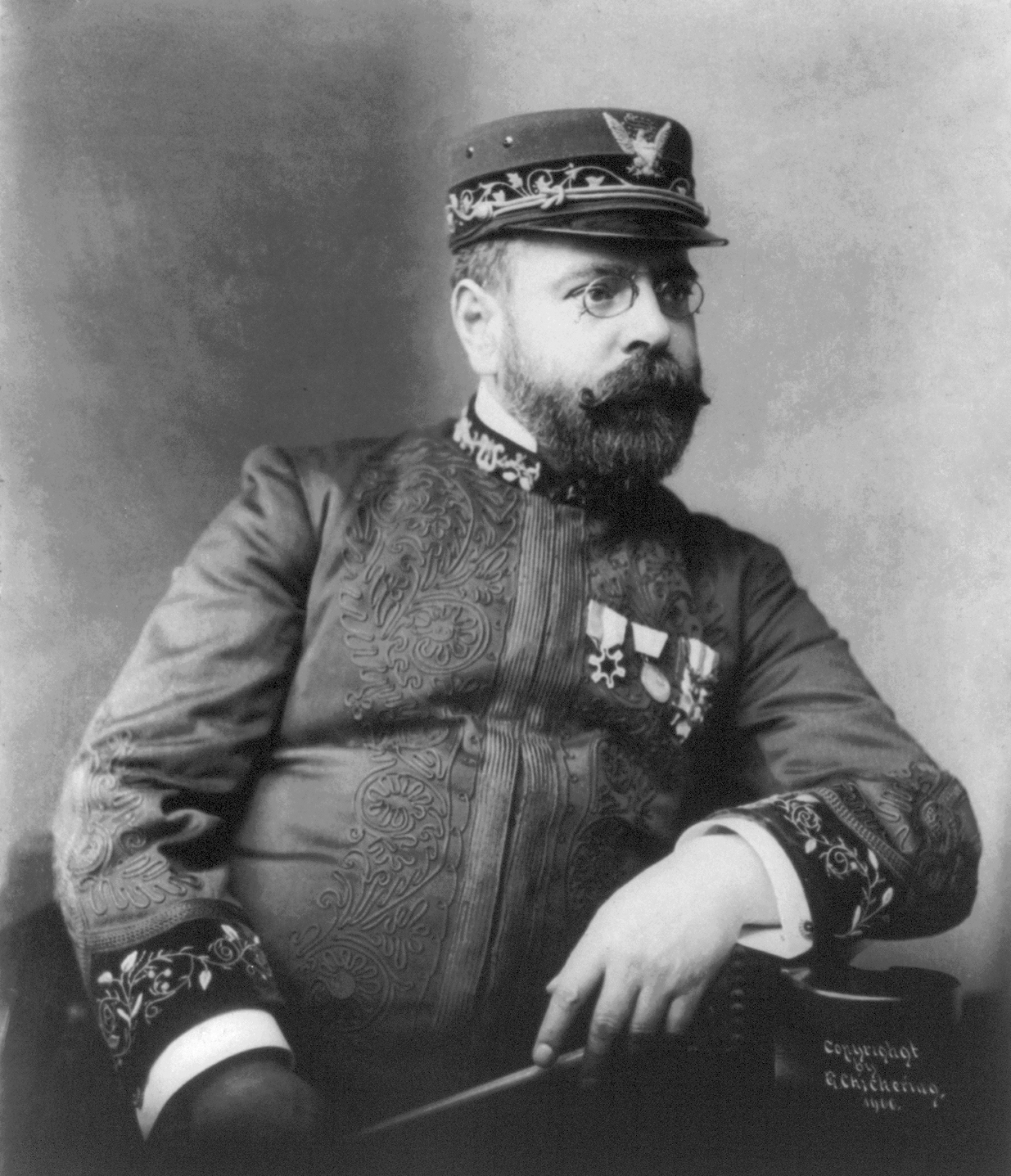
John Philip Sousa

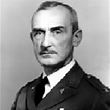
Edmund Gruber

The lyrics as of 1918 are as follows:

Over hill, over dale,
We will hit the dusty trail,
And those Caissons go rolling along.

In and out, hear them shout!
Counter marching all about,
And those Caissons go rolling along,

For it's high high he,
In the Field Artillery,
Shout out your "No" [numbers] loud and strong,

For wher-e’er we go,
You will always know,
That those Caissons go rolling along.

Alternatively:

Over hill, over dale,
As we hit the dusty trail
And the Caissons go rolling along.
In and out, hear them shout!
Counter march and right about,
And the Caissons go rolling along.

Then it's Heigh! Heigh! Hee!
In the field artillery,
Shout out your numbers loud and strong,
For where'er you go,
You will always know
That the Caissons go rolling along.

In the storm, in the night,
Action left or action right
See those Caissons go rolling along
Limber front, limber rear,
Prepare to mount your cannoneer
And those Caissons go rolling along.

Then it's Heigh! Heigh! Hee!
In the field artillery,
Shout out your numbers loud and strong,
For where'er you go,
You will always know
That the Caissons go rolling along.

Was it high, was it low,
Where the heck did that one go?
As those Caissons go rolling along.
Was it left, was it right,
Now we won't get home tonight
And those Caissons go rolling along.

Then it's Heigh! Heigh! Hee!
In the field artillery,
Shout out your numbers loud and strong,
For where'er you go,
You will always know
That the Caissons go rolling along.

The phrase in the first line is Shakespearean, from A Midsummer Night's Dream, Act II, Scene 1: "Over hill, over dale / Thorough bush, thorough briar / Over park, over pale / Thorough flood, thorough fire".

== In popular culture ==
Hasbro used a version of the tune with slightly different lyrics in 1987 for its Army Ants toyline.

Hell Let Loose, a World War II simulator video game, uses the tune along with other selections as part of its main menu music.

Girls und Panzer, where it is a leitmotif for the Saunders University High School, put alongside "Battle Hymn of the Republic."

Animaniacs has done a parody of this song named "On The Homefront Were Marching Along" in Episode 57 titled "Of Course, You Know This Means Warners."

== See also ==
- List of marches by John Philip Sousa
