= Irving J. Phillipson =

US Army major general (1882–1955)

- National Archives photo of Phillipson as a colonel in 1937
- Born: 3 April 1882; Dowagiac, Michigan, US
- Died: 4 April 1955 (aged 73); Barcelona, Spain
- Burial place: Arlington National Cemetery
- Education: United States Military Academy; United States Army Command and General Staff College; United States Army War College
- Spouse(s): Florence Morrison (m. 1909–1952) Elsie Agnes Salvadori (m. 1954–1955)
- Military career
- Service: United States Army
- Service years: 1904–1944
- Rank: Major General
- Service number: 01923
- Units: US Army Infantry Branch; US Army Adjutant General's Corps
- Commands: Company F, 1st Infantry Regiment; 2nd Battalion, 142nd Infantry Regiment; 144th Infantry Regiment; 143rd Infantry Regiment; 72nd Infantry Brigade; Enlisted Division, Office of the US Army Adjutant General; Budget and Legislative Planning Division, War Department General Staff; Presidio of San Francisco; 30th Infantry Regiment; 2nd Infantry Brigade; 98th Division; Second Corps Area; Army Emergency Relief
- Conflicts: Moro Rebellion; World War I Occupation of the Rhineland; World War II
- Awards: Army Distinguished Service Medal; Croix de Guerre (France)
- Other work: Director of Industrial Relations, Botany Worsted Mills

Irving Joseph Phillipson (3 April 1882 – 4 April 1955) was a career officer in the United States Army. A 1904 graduate of the United States Military Academy, he served until 1944 and was a veteran of the Moro Rebellion, World War I, Occupation of the Rhineland, and World War II. He attained the rank of major general and was a recipient of the Army Distinguished Service Medal and French Croix de Guerre.

A native of Dowagiac, Michigan, Phillipson graduated from the United States Military Academy at West Point in 1904 and began his military career in the Infantry. He commanded a company of the 1st Infantry Regiment in the Philippines during the Moro Rebellion. During World War I, he advanced to temporary colonel and commanded several regiments in succession, followed by command of the 72nd Infantry Brigade.

After the First World War, Phillipson served in the Office of the US Army Adjutant General as chief of the Enlisted Division and on the War Department General Staff as Budget and Legislative Planning Division. Later assignments included command of the Presidio of San Francisco and 30th Infantry Regiment. As a general officer in the years before World War II, he commanded the 2nd Infantry Brigade. During the war, he commanded the Second Corps Area and served as executive director of Army Emergency Relief. After retiring from the army in 1944, Phillipson served as director of industrial relations for Botany Worsted Mills of Passaic, New Jersey.

== Early life ==
Phillipson as a West Point Cadet in 1904

Irving J. Phillipson was born in Dowagiac, Michigan on 3 April 1882, a son of Emanuel Phillipson and Bertha (Guggenheim) Phillipson. He was raised in a Jewish household and educated in Dowagiac, and he was the valedictorian of the class of 1899 at Dowagiac High School. In May 1899, Phillipson finished first of 22 applicants on the competitive exam for appointment to the United States Military Academy at West Point that was offered by US Representative Edward L. Hamilton. He attended the academy from 1900 to 1904 and graduated ranked 47th of 124. At graduation, Phillipson received his commission as a second lieutenant of Infantry.

Several of Phillipson's classmates also attained general officer rank, including: Thomas M. Robins; Lesley J. McNair; George R. Allin; Pelham D. Glassford; William Bryden; Robert C. Richardson Jr.; Francis W. Honeycutt; Jay L. Benedict; George Veazey Strong; Charles School Blakely; Joseph W. Stilwell; Robert M. Danford; Edmund L. Gruber; Harry S. Berry; Edmund B. Gregory; Henry C. Pratt; Donald C. Cubbison; Thomas M. Robins; Innis P. Swift, and Charles F. Thompson. Among his classmates who did not attain general's rank was Arthur H. Wilson, a recipient of the Medal of Honor.

== Start of career ==
Phillipson's first assignment was with the 1st Infantry Regiment at Fort Wayne, Michigan. January 1906 to May 1908, he was assigned to the Philippines, where he served with the US garrison at Baybay as commander of the regiment's Company F during the Moro Rebellion. After his return to the United States, he served with his regiment at Vancouver Barracks, Washington, where he remained until July 1912. Phillipson was promoted to first lieutenant in March 1911. From April to September 1911, he served as assistant quartermaster at the army depot in Seattle, Washington during planning for the Land Defense Project that was intended to protect Puget Sound in the event of an attack.

From July 1912 to November 1915, Phillipson served with the 1st Infantry at Schofield Barracks, Hawaii. He then transferred to the 28th Infantry Regiment and was assigned to duty at the Fort McDowell, California recruiting depot. He served at Fort McDowell until February 1918 and was promoted to captain in July 1916. With the army expanding after American entry into World War I in April 1917, Phillipson received temporary promotion to major in August 1917. He served with the 28th Infantry at Camp Bowie near Fort Worth, Texas and at the 13th Training Area in France.

From February to August 1918, Phillipson was assigned as inspector of the 36th Division. His next posting was with the division's 142nd Infantry Regiment as commander of its 2nd Battalion, and he was promoted to temporary lieutenant colonel in September. He commanded the 36th Division's 144th Infantry Regiment in combat for several days in October, then was promoted to temporary colonel as commander of the 36th Division's 143rd Infantry Regiment. He commanded the 143rd in combat until the Armistice of November 11, 1918 ended the war, after which he remained in France as commander of the regiment and the 72nd Infantry Brigade (143rd and 144th Infantry Regiments and 133rd Machine Gun Battalion) during the post-war Occupation of the Rhineland. He returned to the United States in June 1919.

== Continued career ==
Phillipson as a major in 1926

After returning to the United States, Phillipson performed temporary recruiting duty at Camp Bowie from June to July 1919, then was assigned to the Recruiting Division in the Office of the US Army Adjutant General. He returned to his regular rank of captain in March 1920. In July 1920, he received promotion to major. He served in the Adjutant General's office from August 1920 to September 1921. He was then posted to Fort Leavenworth, Kansas, where he was a student at the School of the Line, which he completed as an honor graduate in 1922. In May 1922, he was transferred from the Infantry to the Adjutant General's Corps.

From 1922 to 1923, Phillipson was a student at the United States Army Command and General Staff College. From August 1923 to June 1924, he attended the United States Army War College. After graduation, he returned to duty in the Adjutant General's office; from July 1926 to June 1928, he was chief of the Enlisted Division. In May 1928, he transferred back to the Infantry branch and received promotion to lieutenant colonel. From July 1928 to June 1930, he was executive officer of the 16th Infantry Regiment at Fort Jay, New York. In July 1930, Phillipson was posted to duty with the War Department General Staff. He remained there until August 1935, including assignment as chief of the Budget and Legislative Planning Division beginning in July 1931. He was promoted to colonel in August 1935 and assigned to the Presidio of San Francisco as commander of the 30th Infantry Regiment and the post. During Phillipson's command, the 30th Infantry participated in the June 1937 opening ceremonies for the Golden Gate Bridge.

== Later career ==
From Assembly magazine, October 1955

Phillipson was promoted to brigadier general in July 1938 and assigned to command the 2nd Infantry Brigade at Fort Ontario, New York. During this command posting, he also served as commander of the Reserve 98th Division. From November 1938 to November 1939, he performed additional duty as deputy director of maneuvers conducted by First Army in Upstate New York. In March 1940, he was appointed chief of staff of the Second Corps Area at Governors Island, New York, and he was assigned as commander in December. In April 1941, Phillipson was promoted to temporary major general. As corps area commander, Phillipson supervised wartime organization and training for units as they prepared for overseas combat. In addition, he was responsible for overseeing coastal air defense readiness across New York, New Jersey, and Delaware.

From May 1942 to January 1944, Phillipson was executive director of Army Emergency Relief. Responsible for morale boosting efforts in addition to providing financial assistance to soldiers and their families, Phillipson played a key role in obtaining army approval for production of the Broadway musical This Is the Army and the subsequent film of the same name; profits from both were donated to AER and Phillipson received mock checks in news photos to boost public awareness of the effort. From January to December 1944, he was a member of the War Department Dependency Board, the casualty assistance branch of the Adjutant General's Office, which handled dependency determinations and probate and benefit determinations for service members' families. He retired for disability on 31 December 1944.

After retiring from the army, Phillipson resided in Passaic, New Jersey, where he was employed until 1952 as director of industrial relations for Botany Worsted Mills. While in this position, he authored The Botany Plan, a cooperative educational program in labor-management relations conducted by Botany Mills and the Textile Workers Union of America. In addition, he served as Passaic's director of civil defense and chairman of the Second Service Command's civilian advisory committee. He was also a director of the Passaic chapter of the American Red Cross and vice chairman of the Disabled American Veterans' Trustees Service Foundation. In addition, he was an honorary vice president of the American Social Hygiene Association. He belonged to Scabbard and Blade, the Newcomen Society of England, the New York Society of Military and Naval Officers of World Wars, the Army and Navy Club of Washington, the Lotos Club of New York and the Pennington Club of Passaic. Phillipson later lived in Manhattan and traveled extensively. In April 1955, he experienced a heart attack while aboard a ship traveling from Rio de Janeiro, Brazil to Barcelona, Spain. He completed the trip, but died at his hotel on Barcelona on 4 April 1955. Phillipson was buried at Arlington National Cemetery.

== Works by ==
- "The Infantry's Recruiting Problem". Infantry Journal. Washington, DC: United States Infantry Association. May 1920. pp. 967–971 – via Google Books.
- "General McClellan's Intentions on 25 June, 1862". The Coast Artillery Journal. Fort Monroe, Virginia: US Army Coast Artillery School. October 1926. pp. 311–323 – via Google Books.

== Awards ==
For his World War II service, Phillipson received the Army Distinguished Service Medal. For his First World War service, he received the French Croix de Guerre with gilt star. In 1950, Phillipson received the American Social Hygiene Association's William Freeman Snow Award for distinguished service to humanity.

=== Distinguished Service Medal citation ===
For exceptionally meritorious and distinguished services to the Government of the United States in a duty of great responsibility during the initial period of war emergency covering the intensive preparation of combat and service units and the rapid expansion of the military establishment. As commanding general, Second Corps Area, in the Eastern Theater of Operations, General Phillipson planned and directed solutions to many important and difficult problems inherent in this densely populated territorial command. His foresight, exceptional skill, and astute management of many complex situations contributed substantially to the development of the Army of the United States and constituted a service of great value to his country.

Service: United States Army Organization: Headquarters, Second Corps Area Conflict: World War II Rank: Major General Orders: War Department, General Orders No. 72 (1944)

== Dates of rank ==
- Second Lieutenant, 15 June 1904
- First Lieutenant, 10 March 1911
- Captain, 1 July 1916
- Major (National Army), 5 August 1917
- Lieutenant Colonel (National Army), 3 September 1918
- Colonel (National Army), 29 October 1918
- Captain, 15 March 1920
- Major, 1 July 1920
- Lieutenant Colonel, 22 May 1928
- Colonel, 1 August 1935
- Brigadier General, 1 July 1938
- Major General (Army of the United States), 3 April 1941
- Major General (Retired), 31 December 1944
