= Francis Honeycutt =

American fencer and soldier (1883–1940)

Francis Webster Honeycutt
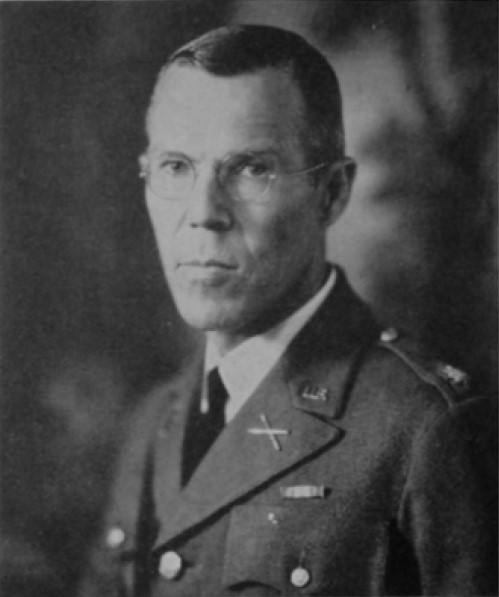
- Born: May 26, 1883; San Francisco, California, US
- Died: September 20, 1940 (aged 57); Woodbine, Georgia, US
- Burial place: United States Military Academy Cemetery
- Military career
- Allegiance: United States of America
- Branch: United States Army
- Service years: 1904–1940
- Rank: Brigadier General
- Unit: Field Artillery Branch
- Commands: 9th Infantry Division; 15th Field Artillery Regiment
- Conflicts: World War I
- Awards: World War I Victory Medal; American Defense Service Medal

Francis Honeycutt
Sport
- Sport: Fencing
Medal record
Men's fencing
Representing United States
Olympic Games
Bronze medal – third place	1920 Antwerp	Foil, team

Francis Webster Honeycutt (May 26, 1883 – September 20, 1940) was an American fencer and military officer. He won a bronze medal in the team foil event at the 1920 Summer Olympics. He rose to the rank of brigadier general in 1940 and assumed command of 9th Infantry Division, before he was killed during an aircraft accident two weeks later.

== Biography ==
Francis W. Honeycutt was born on May 26, 1883, in San Francisco, California, as the son of John Thomas Honeycutt and Jennie Webster. His father was a West Point graduate and Captain in the United States Army, who died of typhoid fever as Commander of Fort Clinch, Florida, in October 1898. Following the high school, Francis received an appointment to the United States Military Academy at West Point, New York, and was active in fencing team.

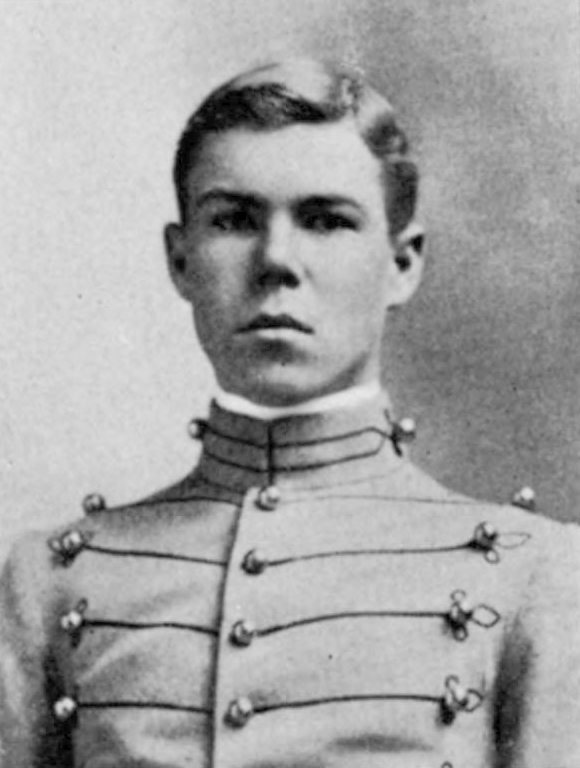
At West Point in 1904

He was a classmate and friend of Joseph Stilwell, the future American commanding general in the China-Burma-India theater of World War II. Also many of his classmates became general officer later in their careers including Lesley J. McNair, Robert C. Richardson, Jr., Jay Leland Benedict, Innis P. Swift, Henry Conger Pratt, Charles F. Thompson, Fulton Q. Gardner, George R. Allin, William Bryden, Walter R. Fulton, George V. Strong, Pelham D. Glassford, Irving J. Phillipson, Donald C. Cubbison and Thomas M. Robins.

Honeycutt graduated with Bachelor of Science degree in June 1904 and was commissioned second lieutenant in the Field Artillery branch. He returned to the Military Academy as a mathematics instructor from 1907 to 1911. Honeycutt served in the various field artillery assignments and commanded 338th Field Artillery Regiment as the part of 88th Division during the World War I, where he trained the replacements at Camp Dodge, Iowa, until June 1918.

Following the war, Honeycutt graduated from the Command and General Staff School in 1923. He rose through the ranks and commanded 1st Battalion, 18th Field Artillery Regiment in Oklahoma City from July 1927 to August 1928 and later served on the faculty of the Army War College after graduating in 1929.

In August 1935, Honeycutt was ordered to Fort Sam Houston, Texas, and commanded 15th Field Artillery Regiment until March 1937, when he was ordered to the Philippines for service as Commanding officer, 12th Field Artillery Brigade at Fort Stotsenburg.

Honeycutt returned to the United States in early September 1940, was promoted to the rank of brigadier general and assumed command of 13th Field Artillery Brigade at Fort Bragg, North Carolina. Following the reactivation of 9th Infantry Division at Fort Bragg, he succeeded Charles Bernadou Elliott as acting commander of the division and commander of the post at Fort Bragg.

On September 20, 1940, General Honeycutt was killed in Army plane crash accident near Woodbine, Georgia, while returning from Jacksonville, Florida, where he was for a conference on military matters. Two other men killed in the crash were: Capt. George F. Kehoe, pilot of the craft, and Corporal Robert J. Schmitz, radioman and mechanic. Honeycutt was buried with full military honors at United States Military Academy Cemetery.

He was married to Margaret Harmon (1882–1979), a daughter of Colonel Millard F. Harmon and sister of lieutenant generals Millard F. Harmon Jr. and Hubert R. Harmon. From his marriage with Margaret, Honeycutt had one son, future Major General John T. Honeycutt and two daughters, Jane (1919–2011), a wife of Colonel William W. West, III and Margaret (1913–1972), a wife of Major general Donald P. Graul.
