= Donald C. Cubbison =

US Army major general (1882–1968)

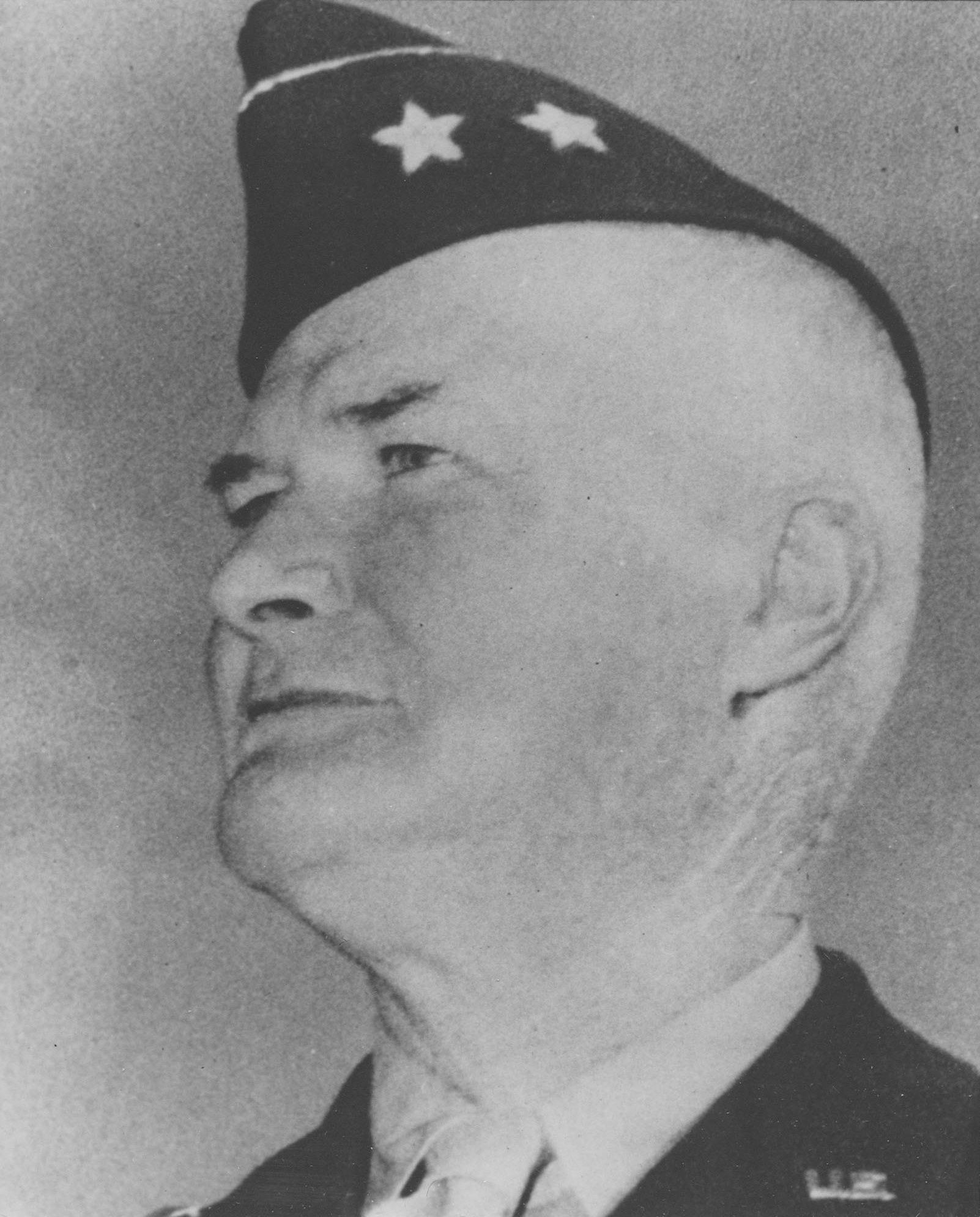
- Cameron as a major general during World War II
- Born: 8 May 1882; Harrisville, Pennsylvania, US
- Died: 25 December 1968 (aged 86); Carmel-by-the-Sea, California, US
- Burial place: El Carmelo Cemetery, Pacific Grove, California, US
- Education: United States Military Academy; United States Army Command and General Staff College; United States Army War College
- Spouse: Lucile Abrams (m. 1908–1968)
- Children: 3
- Military career
- Service: United States Army
- Service years: 1904–1946
- Rank: Major General
- Service number: O-1931
- Unit: US Army Field Artillery Branch
- Commands: II Corps Artillery School; 1st Field Artillery Regiment; 6th Infantry Brigade; 11th Field Artillery Brigade; Field Artillery School; 1st Infantry Division; Field Artillery Replacement Center, Fort Bragg
- Conflicts: Pancho Villa Expedition; World War I Occupation of the Rhineland; World War II
- Awards: Army Distinguished Service Medal; Legion of Merit; Legion of Honor (Chevalier) (France); Croix de Guerre with palm (France)

Donald C. Cubbison (8 May 1882 – 25 December 1968) was a career officer in the United States Army. A veteran of World War I and World War II, he attained the rank of major general. Cubbison's commands included the 1st Infantry Division, and his awards included the Army Distinguished Service Medal and Legion of Merit.

A native of Harrisville, Pennsylvania, Cubbison was raised and educated in Harrisville, then in Kansas City, Kansas, where he lived with an older brother following the death of their father. He graduated from the United States Military Academy at West Point in 1904, and was commissioned in the Field Artillery. Assignments early in his career included postings to the Philippines, then in Texas during the Pancho Villa Expedition. During World War I, he was director of the II Corps Artillery School, chief of staff for I Corps Artillery, and head of the Field Artillery section in the Office of the Chief of Artillery for the American Expeditionary Forces.

After his wartime service, Cubbison served as West Point's treasurer and as professor of military science at Stanford University. In the 1930s, he commanded the 1st Field Artillery Regiment and 6th and 11th Infantry Brigades, and was commandant of the Field Artillery School. During World War II, Cubbison commanded the 1st Infantry Division, then the Field Artillery Replacement Center at Fort Bragg, North Carolina.

Cubbison retired in 1946 and resided in Carmel-by-the-Sea, California. He died in Carmel on 25 December 1968. Cubbison was buried at El Carmelo Cemetery in Pacific Grove, California.

== Early life ==
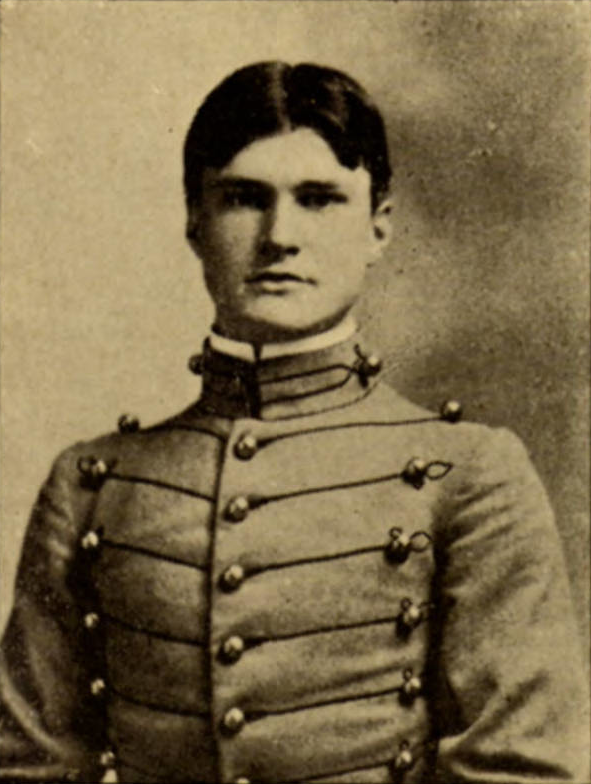
Cubbison at West Point c. 1904

Donald Cameron Cubbison was born in Harrisville, Pennsylvania on 8 May 1882, a son of James N. Cubbison and Mary (Kerr) Cubbison. He was raised and educated in Harrisville, then in Kansas City, Kansas, where he lived with an older brother following the death of their father. He graduated from Wyandotte High School, then received an appointment to the United States Military Academy at West Point from US Representative Justin De Witt Bowersock.

Cubbison attended West Point from 1900 to 1904, and graduated ranked 58th of 124. Several of his classmates also became general officers during the First and Second World Wars, including George R. Allin, Jay Leland Benedict, William Bryden, Robert M. Danford, Pelham D. Glassford, Edmund L. Gruber, Francis Honeycutt, Lesley J. McNair, Henry Conger Pratt, Robert C. Richardson Jr., Thomas M. Robins, Joseph Stilwell, George Veazey Strong, Innis P. Swift, and Charles F. Thompson. Among his classmates who did not attain general's rank was Arthur H. Wilson, a recipient of the Medal of Honor.

=== Family ===
In 1908, Cubbison married Lucile Abrams. They were married until his death and were the parents of three children, Donald Jr., Rose, and Gordon.

== Start of career ==
After graduating from West Point, Cubbison was commissioned as a second lieutenant of Field Artillery and assigned to duty at Fort Myer, Virginia. In October 1904, he was severely injured in an accident when he was moving off a live fire artillery range at Mount Gretna, Pennsylvania after recording hits on a target, and a round exploded early; he required several months of hospitalization before he could return to duty. From June 1905 to June 1907, he served at Fort Snelling, Minnesota with the 4th Battery of Field Artillery, which was later designated Battery A, 1st Field Artillery Regiment. In January 1907, Cubbison received promotion to first lieutenant. From September 1909 to September 1910, he attended the Mounted Service School at Fort Riley, Kansas. From September 1910 to April 1914, he was assigned to Coast Artillery duty at Fort Slocum, New York.

In May 1914, Cubbison was transferred to the 2nd Field Artillery Regiment. He served at Fort William McKinley, Philippines until September 1914, when he was posted to Camp Stotsenburg. He was promoted to captain in July 1916 and returned to the United States in August. After transfer to the 4th Field Artillery Regiment, he took part in the Pancho Villa Expedition until February 1917. He was assigned to duty in El Paso, Texas until May, when he was transferred to the 7th Field Artillery Regiment and assigned to Fort Keogh, Montana. With the army preparing to send troops overseas following American entry into World War I in April, he remained in Montana only briefly, before receiving order to join the 7th Field Artillery Brigade at Fort Sam Houston, Texas.

== Continued career ==
In July 1917, Cubbison sailed for wartime duty France, and upon arrival he attended the French army's Field Artillery School at Fontainebleau from August until November. He was promoted to temporary lieutenant colonel in August 1917. Cubbison was assistant director of the I Corps Artillery School from December 1917 to January 1918. From February to April 1918, he was director of the II Corps Artillery School from February to April 1918. He served as chief of staff for I Corps Artillery from May to September 1918. Beginning in September 1918, he was a temporary colonel assigned as head of the Field Artillery section in the Office of the Chief of Artillery for the American Expeditionary Forces. Cubbison took part in all the major campaigns of 1918, including Champagne-Marne, Aisne-Marne, Château-Thierry, and Belleau Wood.

Cubbison remained on the AEF staff after the Armistice of November 11, 1918 ended the war, and he remained in Europe during the post-war Occupation of the Rhineland. He returned to the United States in March 1919 and was assigned to the staff of the United States Department of War. In September 1919, he was assigned to the Field Artillery Board at Fort Sill, which reviewed lessons learned during the war and made recommendations on future doctrine, tactics, and equipment. He was reduced to the rank of major in March 1920. From September 1920 to June 1921, he was an instructor and faculty member at the Fort Leavenworth, Kansas School of the Line. From July 1921 to June 1922, he attended the United States Army Command and General Staff College.

== Later career ==
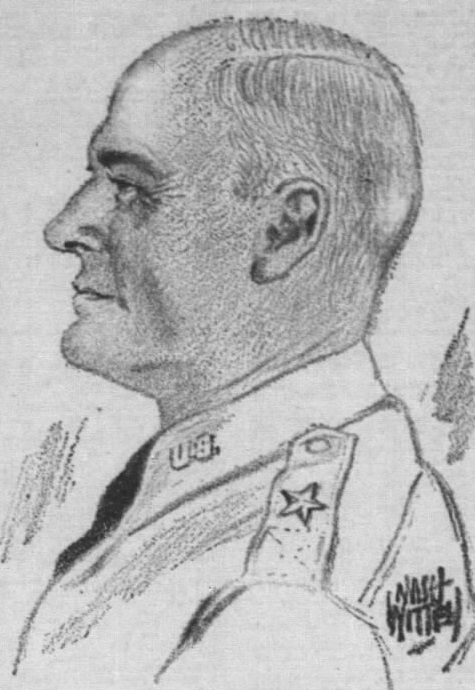
Cubbison as a brigadier general in 1939

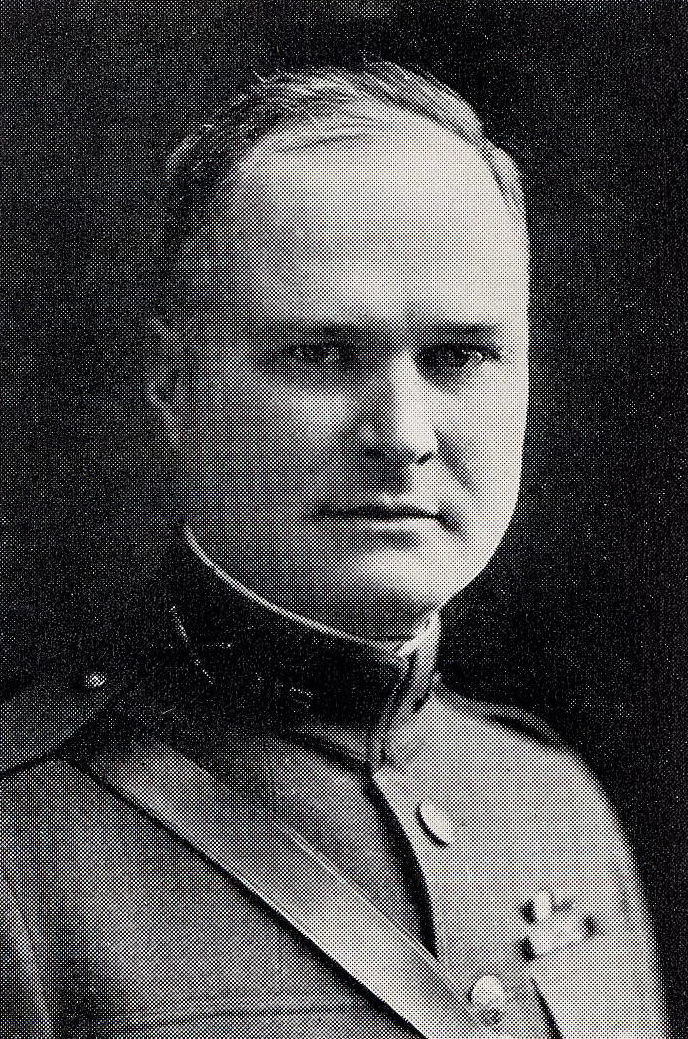
Cubbison as Treasurer of the Military Academy c. 1923

After his staff college graduation, Cubbison was assigned as treasurer of the United States Military Academy, where he served from August 1922 to August 1926. He was then assigned as a student at the United States Army War College, from which he graduated in June 1927. From July 1927 to August 1930, Cubbison served on the staff of the army's Chief of Field Artillery. In September 1930, he was appointed professor of military science and tactics at Stanford University, where he remained until September 1935. In August 1935, Cubbison was promoted to colonel, and in September he was assigned to command the 1st Field Artillery Regiment at Fort Sill.

From June 1937 to June 1938, Cubbison was assigned as assistant commandant of the Field Artillery School at Fort Sill. From July 1938 to June 1939, he commanded the 6th Infantry Brigade at Fort Douglas, Utah. In August 1938, he received promotion to brigadier general. In June 1939, he was assigned to command the 11th Field Artillery Brigade at Schofield Barracks, Hawaii. In July 1940, he was assigned as commandant of the Field Artillery School. During World War II he commanded the 1st Infantry Division from January 1941 to May 1942, and he was promoted to major general. From May 1942 to October 1945, Cubbison commanded the Field Artillery Replacement Center at Fort Bragg, North Carolina. He retired for disability in February 1946, three months before he would have reached the mandatory retirement age of 64.

In retirement, Cubbison resided in Carmel-by-the-Sea, California. He died in Carmel on 25 December 1968. He was buried at El Carmelo Cemetery in Pacific Grove, California.

== Awards ==
Among Cubbison's awards were the Mexican Service Medal, World War I Victory Medal with five battle clasps, Legion of Merit, French Legion of Honor (Chevalier), and French Croix de Guerre with palm.

In 1922, Cubbison was awarded the Army Distinguished Service Medal for his World War I service. The citation read:

The President of the United States of America, authorized by Act of Congress, July 9, 1918, takes pleasure in presenting the Army Distinguished Service Medal to Colonel (Field Artillery) Donald Cameron Cubbison, United States Army, for exceptionally meritorious and distinguished services to the Government of the United States, in a duty of great responsibility during World War I. Serving in turn as Director, 2d Corps Artillery School, from January to April 1918, Chief of Staff of the Artillery of the 1st and 4th Army Corps from May to September 1918, Chief of Field Artillery Section, Office of Chief of Artillery, American Expeditionary Forces, from September 1918 to March 1919, Colonel Cubbison performed his duties in a conspicuously meritorious manner at all times. By his great energy, sound judgment, marked ability, and high professional attainments he contributed materially to the successes achieved against the enemy, rendering invaluable services to the American Expeditionary Forces.

Service: United States Army Rank: Colonel (Field Artillery) Regiment: Office of Chief of Artillery Division: American Expeditionary Forces Action Date: World War I Orders: War Department, General Orders No. 56 (1922)

== Dates of rank ==
Cubbison's dates of rank were:

- Second Lieutenant, 15 June 1904
- First Lieutenant, 25 January 1907
- Captain, 1 July 1916
- Lieutenant Colonel (National Army), 5 August 1917
- Colonel (National Army), 18 September 1918
- Major, 4 September 1919
- Major, 27 March 1920
- Lieutenant Colonel, 26 June 1928
- Colonel, 1 August 1935
- Brigadier General, 1 August 1938
- Major General (Army of the United States), 30 January 1941
- Major General (Retired), 28 February 1946
