= George Veazey Strong =

United States Army general

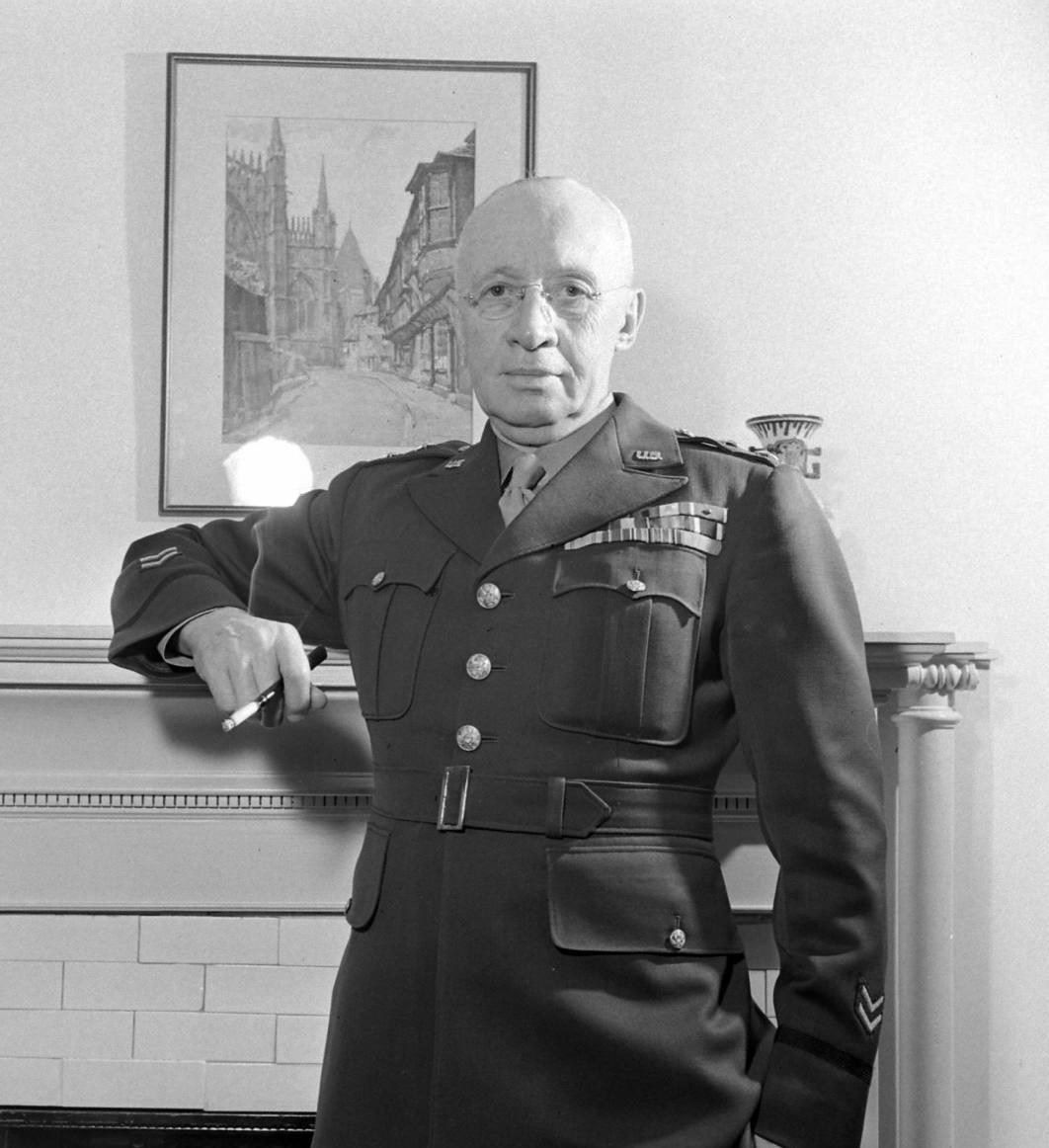
- Born: March 14, 1880; Evanston, Illinois
- Died: January 10, 1946 (aged 65); Washington, D.C.
- Military career
- Allegiance: United States of America
- Branch: United States Army
- Service years: 1904–1945
- Rank: Major General
- Service number: 0-1908
- Commands: VIII Corps; Chief of Army Intelligence
- Conflicts: World War I World War II
- Awards: Distinguished Service Medal (2); Legion of Merit; Purple Heart (2)

George Veazey Strong (March 14, 1880 – January 10, 1946) was a U.S. Army general with the rank of major general, who is most famous for his service as commander of the Military Intelligence Corps during World War II.

== Early life ==
Strong was born on March 14, 1880, in the Chicago suburb of Evanston, Illinois, United States. His family later moved to Helena, Montana, where he attended Helena High School. Strong then attended the Michigan Military Academy for two years, graduating in 1900. Subsequently, he attended the United States Military Academy at West Point, New York, and was a graduate of Class of 1904, in which many of his classmates also later became famous generals, for example: Joseph Stilwell, Lesley J. McNair, Robert C. Richardson, Jr., Jay Leland Benedict, Innis P. Swift, Henry Conger Pratt, Francis Honeycutt, Charles F. Thompson, Fulton Q. Gardner, George R. Allin, William Bryden, Walter R. Fulton, Pelham D. Glassford, Irving J. Phillipson, Donald C. Cubbison or Thomas M. Robins. While at West Point, he was an award-winning fencer. Strong was also a graduate of Northwestern University Law School, earning a Bachelor of Laws degree in 1916.

During World War I, Strong served overseas in France with American Expeditionary Forces. Strong served as lieutenant colonel on the staff of IV Corps of the Second United States Army during the Battle of Saint-Mihiel and for his staff service in this assignments, he was awarded with Army Distinguished Service Medal and later with two Purple Hearts.

=== Distinguished Service Medal Citation ===
The official U.S. Army citation for Strong's Distinguished Service Medal reads:

General Orders: War Department, General Orders No. 38 (1922)
Action Date: World War I
Name: George Veazey Strong
Service: Army
Rank: Lieutenant Colonel
Company: Headquarters
Division: 2d Army, American Expeditionary Forces
Citation: The President of the United States of America, authorized by Act of Congress, July 9, 1918, takes pleasure in presenting the Army Distinguished Service Medal to Lieutenant Colonel (Judge Advocate General's Department) George Veazey Strong, United States Army, for exceptionally meritorious and distinguished services to the Government of the United States, in a duty of great responsibility during World War I. While on staff duty with Headquarters, 4th Army Corps and Headquarters, 2d Army, American Expeditionary Forces, Lieutenant Colonel Strong was in charge of all troop movements preparatory to the St. Mihiel attack and immediately following this attack, and was also in charge of all troop movements from the 4th Army Corps in the Toul sector to the Argonne front. By his tireless energy, keen foresight, and sound judgment he perfected the multifarious duties whereby all of these movements were carried to successful completion. During this period his services were conspicuously efficient and contributed materially to the success of these operations.

== Between wars ==
Strong served as a law professor at West Point from 1920 to 1922. He graduated from the United States Army War College in 1924, the advanced course at the United States Army Infantry School in 1929 and the Command and General Staff School in 1931. Strong was promoted to brigadier general on June 1, 1938.

== World War II ==
In 1940, Strong was appointed commander of the Seventh Corps Area and promoted to major general on April 3, 1941, serving in this capacity until May 1941, when he was reassigned to the VIII Corps as its commander. He succeeded Walter Krueger, who was promoted and transferred. Strong stayed in this capacity until 1942, where he was succeeded by Major General Daniel Isom Sultan.

Strong was chosen to become U.S. Army Deputy Chief of Staff for Intelligence (G-2). Major General Strong served in this capacity until January 1944, when he was succeeded by Major General Clayton Bissell. Subsequently, he was retired, but remained employed by the army and attached to the War Department. Strong finally retired in June 1945 and died the following year at Doctors Hospital in Washington, D.C. at the age of 65. He was buried at the West Point Cemetery on January 15, 1946.

For his service during World War II, he was awarded with Oak Leaf Cluster to his Army Distinguished Service Medal and Legion of Merit.

== Decorations ==
Here is Major General Strong's ribbon bar:

1st Row	Army Distinguished Service Medal with Oak Leaf Cluster		Legion of Merit	Purple Heart with Oak Leaf Cluster
2nd Row	Mexican Border Service Medal	World War I Victory Medal with three Battle Clasps	Army of Occupation of Germany Medal	American Defense Service Medal
3rd Row	American Campaign Medal	European-African-Middle Eastern Campaign Medal	World War II Victory Medal	Knight of the Legion of Honor (France)
