= Louisiana Maneuvers =

1941 US military exercise

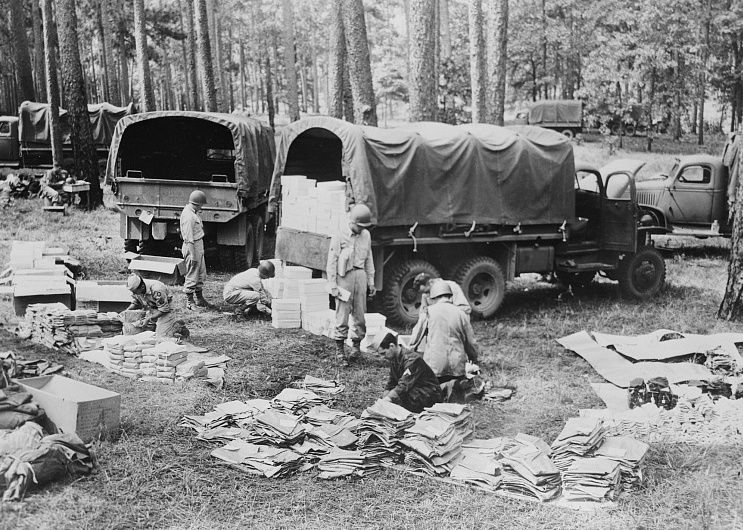
Quartermaster Supply Unit during Louisiana Maneuvers.

The Louisiana Maneuvers were a series of major U.S. Army exercises held from August to September 1941 in northern and west-central Louisiana, an area bounded by the Sabine River to the west, the Calcasieu River to the east, and by the city of Shreveport to the north. The area included Fort Polk (formerly Fort Johnson), Camp Claiborne and Camp Livingston. The exercises, which involved some 400,000 troops, were designed to evaluate U.S. training, logistics, doctrine, and commanders. Similar U.S. Army field exercises carried out in the fall of 1941 included the 2nd Cavalry Division Arkansas Maneuvers in August and the Carolina Maneuvers in November.

Many Army officers present at the maneuvers later rose to very senior roles in World War II, including Omar Bradley, Mark Clark, Dwight D. Eisenhower, Walter Krueger, Lesley J. McNair, Joseph Stilwell, and George Patton.

== Background ==
When Nazi Germany invaded Poland in 1939, starting World War II, the U.S. Army was largely an infantry force with supporting artillery, engineers, and cavalry, as well as combat support and combat service supporting arms. It was far smaller than most European armies, and few units were motorized or mechanized. As war approached, there was a need to both modernize and conduct large-scale maneuvers to test all aspects of a fast-growing, inexperienced force. General George C. Marshall, Army Chief of Staff, appointed General Lesley McNair as director of Army training. He and Colonel Mark Wayne Clark picked thousands of acres of unused land in Louisiana as a good place for large-scale training. The war games were conducted while the British awaited an expected German invasion of the United Kingdom, and some speculated that the National Guard units used in the maneuvers would not be demobilized afterwards.

== Exercises ==
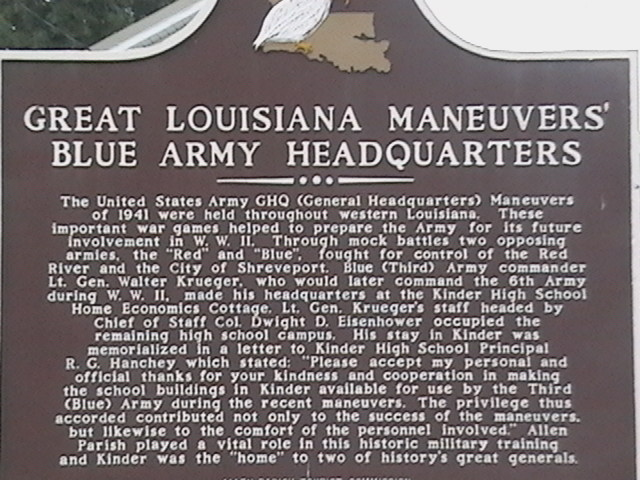
The Blue Army set up headquarters in the high school of the town of Kinder, Louisiana.

Around 400,000 troops were divided into equal armies of two fictitious countries: Kotmk (Kansas, Oklahoma, Texas, Missouri, Kentucky), also called the Red Army; and Almat (Arkansas, Louisiana, Mississippi, Alabama, Tennessee), or the Blue Army. The troops were organized into a total of 19 divisions.

From August to September 1941, the war game was conducted over 3,400 square miles (8,800 km^{2}) of Louisiana. The area was bounded on the west by the Sabine River, on the east by the Calcasieu River, and on the north by the Red River at Shreveport. The two fictitious factions were "at war" over Mississippi River rights. There were two phases to the Louisiana Maneuvers. In Phase 1 of the exercise, both sides were given offensive missions. The Red 2nd Army would cross the Red River on September 15 and invade the Blue homeland. The Blue 3rd Army would move north to intercept the invaders and drive the Red force back across the river. In Phase 2, the Blue Army was both twice as large as the Red and equipped with its own armored division, the 2nd, which had switched sides since Phase 1. Blue's mission was to advance upon and seize Shreveport, Louisiana. The Red force was much smaller and tasked largely with positional defense for a 100-mile zone south of the city. The Blue Army emerged victorious, due chiefly to General George S. Patton, who commanded the Blue 2nd Armored Division.

Omar Bradley, who participated in the exercises, later said that Louisianans welcomed the soldiers with open arms. Some soldiers even slept in some of the residents' houses. Bradley said it was so crowded in those houses sometimes when the soldiers were sleeping, there would hardly be any walking room. Bradley also said a few of the troops were disrespectful towards the residents' land and crops, and would tear down crops for extra food. However, for the most part, residents and soldiers established good relations.

During the exercises, 26 men died, most from drowning in the Sabine River or in vehicle accidents. One died when struck by lightning, and one had a heart attack at age 24.

This exercise also led to the creation of Fort Polk, named for the Confederate General (and Episcopal Bishop) Leonidas Polk, which was renamed to Fort Johnson on June 13, 2023. It was renamed back to Fort Polk in 2025, after WWII Army General James Polk.

== Order of battle ==
=== Louisiana Phase I ===
==== Red Force ====
- Second Army (Lieutenant General Ben Lear)
  - 5th Division (Brigadier General Cortlandt Parker)
  - 35th Division (Major General Ralph E. Truman)
  - VII Corps (Major General Robert C. Richardson)
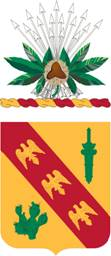
    - 107th Cavalry Regiment (horse-mechanized)
    - 6th Division (Major General Clarence S. Ridley)
    - 27th Division (Major General William N. Haskell)
    - 33rd Division (Major General Samuel T. Lawton)
  - I Armored Corps (Major General Charles L. Scott)
    - 4th Cavalry Regiment (mounted)
    - 2nd Cavalry Division (Major General John Millikin)
    - 1st Armored Division (Major General Bruce Magruder)
    - 2nd Armored Division (Major General George S. Patton)
  - 2nd Air Task Force (Major General Millard F. Harmon)
    - 17th Bombardment Wing
    - 6th Pursuit Wing

==== Blue Force ====
- Third Army (Lieutenant General Walter Krueger)
  - 1st Cavalry Division (Major General Innis P. Swift)
  - 56th Cavalry Brigade (mounted)
  - 1st Antitank Group
  - 2nd Antitank Group
  - 3rd Antitank Group
  - 1st Tank Group
  - Company A, 502nd Parachute Battalion
  - IV Corps (Major General Jay L. Benedict)
    - 6th Cavalry Regiment (horse-mechanized)
    - 31st Division (Major General John C. Persons)
    - 38th Division (Major General Daniel I. Sultan)
    - 43rd Division (Major General Morris B. Payne)
  - V Corps (Major General Edmund L. Daley)
    - 106th Cavalry Regiment (horse-mechanized)
    - 32nd Division (Major General Irving A. Fish)
    - 34th Division (Brigadier General Russell P. Hartle)
    - 37th Division (Major General Robert S. Beightler)
  - VIII Corps (Major General George V. Strong)
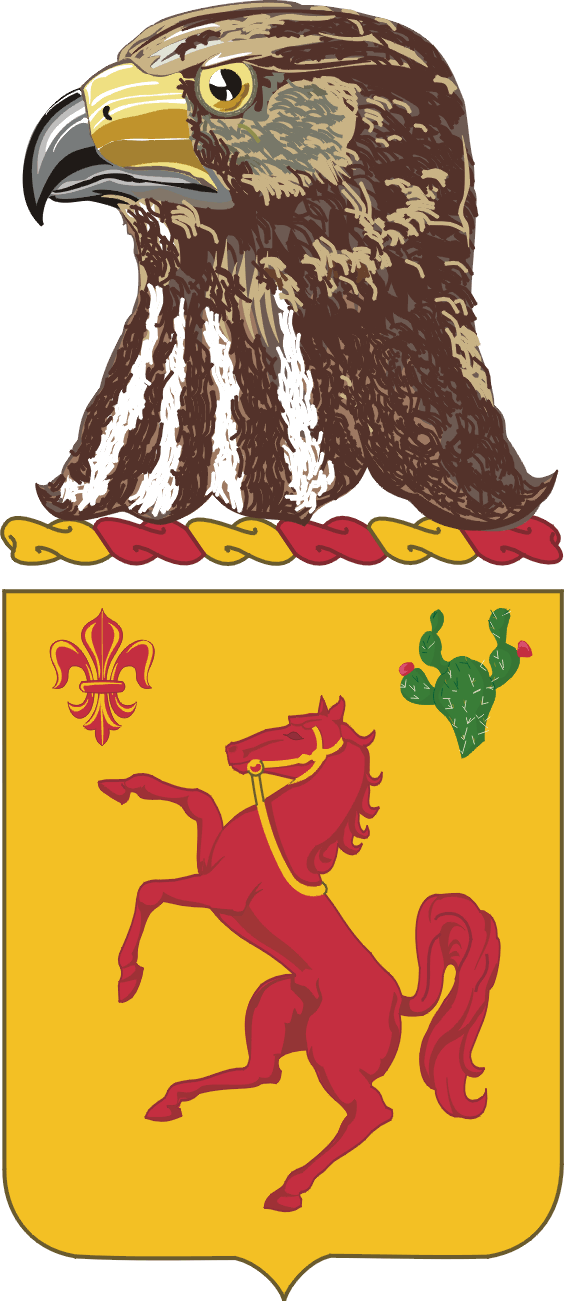
    - 113th Cavalry Regiment (horse-mechanized)
    - 2nd Division (Major General John N. Greely)
    - 36th Division (Brigadier General Fred L. Walker)
    - 45th Division (Major General William S. Key)
  - 3rd Air Task Force (Major General Herbert A. Dargue)
    - 2nd Bombardment Wing
    - 10th Pursuit Wing

=== Louisiana Phase II ===
==== Red Force ====
- Second Army (Lieutenant General Ben Lear)
  - 2nd Cavalry Division (Major General John Millikin)
  - 4th Cavalry Regiment (mounted)
  - 1st Antitank Group
  - 2nd Antitank Group
  - 5th Division (-) (Brigadier General Cortlandt Parker)
  - 6th Division (Major General Clarence S. Ridley)
  - 1st Armored Division (Major General Bruce Magruder)
  - Company A, 502nd Parachute Battalion
  - VII Corps (Major General Robert C. Richardson)
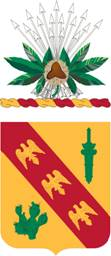
    - 107th Cavalry Regiment (horse-mechanized)
    - 27th Division (Major General William N. Haskell)
    - 33rd Division (Major General Samuel T. Lawton)
    - 35th Division (Major General Ralph E. Truman)
  - 2nd Air Task Force (Major General Millard F. Harmon)
    - 17th Bombardment Wing
    - 6th Pursuit Wing

==== Blue Force ====
- Third Army (Lieutenant General Walter Krueger)
  - 1st Cavalry Division (Major General Innis P. Swift)
  - 56th Cavalry Brigade (mounted)
  - 3rd Antitank Group
  - 1st Tank Group
  - IV Corps (Major General Jay L. Benedict)
    - 6th Cavalry Regiment (horse-mechanized)
    - 31st Division (Major General John C. Persons)
    - 38th Division (Major General Daniel I. Sultan)
    - 43rd Division (Major General Morris B. Payne)
  - V Corps (Major General Edmund L. Daley)
    - 106th Cavalry Regiment (horse-mechanized)
    - 32nd Division (Major General Irving A. Fish)
    - 34th Division (Brigadier General Russell P. Hartle)
    - 37th Division (Major General Robert S. Beightler)
  - VIII Corps (Major General George V. Strong)
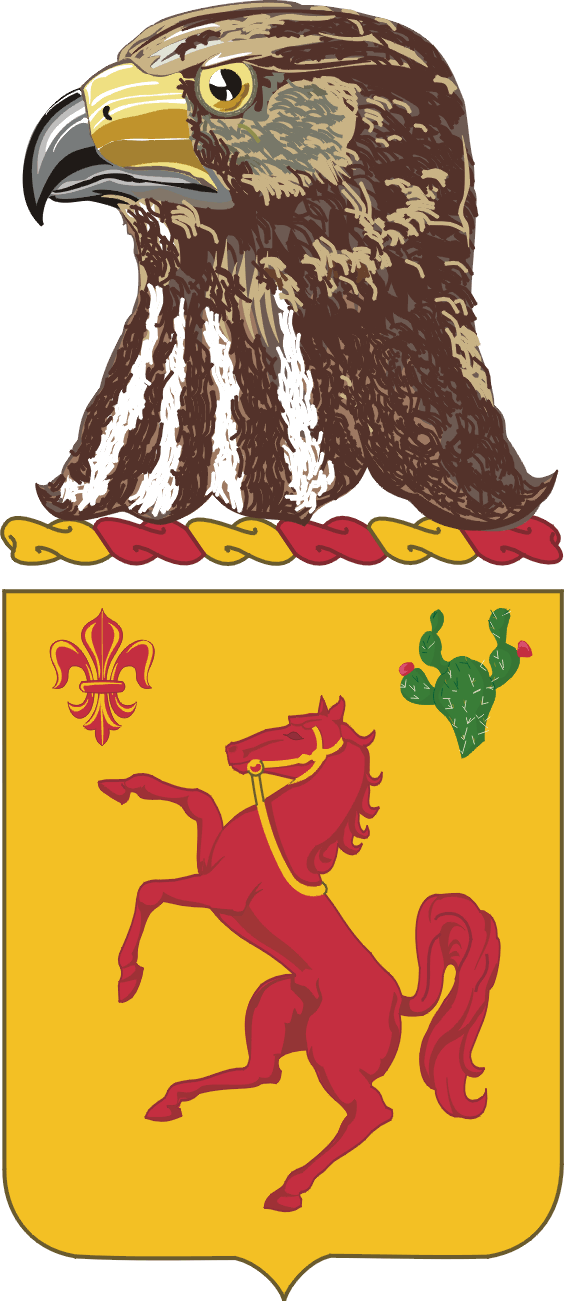
    - 113th Cavalry Regiment (horse-mechanized)
    - 36th Division (Brigadier General Fred L. Walker)
    - 45th Division (Major General William S. Key)
  - I Armored Corps (Major General Charles L. Scott)
    - 1st Armored Division (Major General Bruce Magruder)
    - 2nd Armored Division (Major General George S. Patton)
  - 3rd Air Task Force (Major General Herbert A. Dargue)
    - 2nd Bombardment Wing
    - 10th Pursuit Wing

== Lessons ==
Built around a nucleus from Chaffee's 7th Mechanized Cavalry, the 1st U.S. Armored Division tested the ability of a very large combined-arms mechanized unit to move long distances, maintain troops and vehicles in combat conditions, and affect the outcome of tactical and operational-level problems. The armored division concept was considered sound and led to the formation of 16 U.S. armored divisions during World War II.

U.S. defensive doctrine was based on the perceived need to defeat German blitzkrieg tactics; U.S. units expected to be faced with large numbers of German tanks attacking on relatively narrow fronts. The maneuvers tested the concept of the tank destroyer. This concept, originating with artillery officers, consisted of large numbers of highly mobile guns to be held in reserve. Upon an enemy tank attack, the towed or self-propelled tank destroyers would be rapidly deployed to the flanks of the penetration with the intent of taking a heavy toll of attacking tanks. Tank destroyers were supposed to employ aggressive, high-speed hit-and-run tactics against tanks. The use of these guns was distinct from the forward placement of towed antitank guns assigned as a normal part of the Infantry Regiment. The Louisiana Maneuvers' data showed that the Infantry's AT guns took a much higher toll on "enemy" tanks than did the tank destroyer battalions' guns. However, the conclusion drawn was that a tank destroyer force of independent tank destroyer battalions should be raised.

In actual practice during World War II, such massed enemy tank attacks rarely happened; indeed, throughout the war only one TD battalion ever fought in an engagement quite like that which had originally been envisaged, at the Battle of El Guettar. The tank destroyer command eventually numbered over 100,000 men and 80 battalions equipped with 36 tank destroyers or towed anti-tank guns each. Immediately after the war, the force was disbanded and the anti-tank role was formally taken over by the Infantry, Engineer and Armor branches.

The exercise was also notable for the first wide-scale testing of the new C ration. Valuable data was obtained regarding weight of meals, composition and shape of can used. The resulting amendments produced the standard "C" field ration used by U.S ground forces for the bulk of World War II.
