= William Durward Connor =

US Army general (1874–1960)

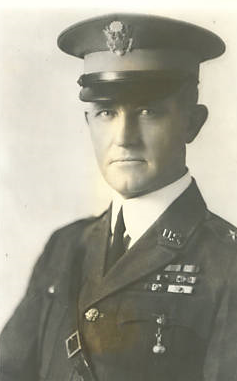
- Major General William D. Connor
- Born: February 22, 1874; Newark, Wisconsin, US
- Died: June 16, 1960 (aged 86); Washington, D.C., US
- Burial place: West Point Cemetery
- Military career
- Allegiance: United States of America
- Branch: United States Army
- Service years: 1897–1938; 1941–1942
- Rank: Major General
- Service number: 0-84
- Unit: Corps of Engineers
- Commands: Superintendent of the United States Military Academy; Commandant of the Army War College; 2nd Infantry Division; US Army forces in China; US Army Engineer School; American forces in France; 63rd Brigade
- Conflicts: Spanish–American War; World War I World War II
- Awards: Army Distinguished Service Medal; Silver Star (2); Order of the Bath (United Kingdom); Commander of the Legion of Honour (France); Croix de guerre (France)

William Durward Connor (February 22, 1874 – June 16, 1960) was a career United States Army officer who became a superintendent of the United States Military Academy after originally serving in the Corps of Engineers. While stationed in the Philippines, he participated in the Spanish–American War. He later served with the American Expeditionary Forces during World War I.

== Early life and education ==
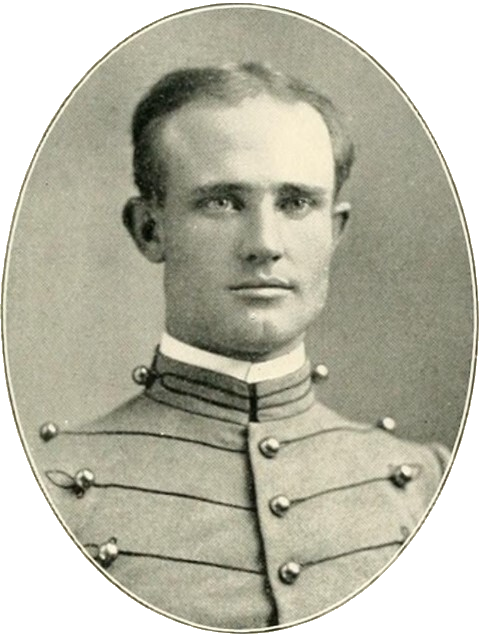
Connor as a cadet at West Point.

Connor, the son of Edward D. Connor and Adeline Powers Connor, was born in Wisconsin on February 22, 1874; according to his 1925 passport application, he was born in the town of Newark, in Rock County. He received an appointment to West Point from Iowa, graduating first in his class in 1897; his Cullum number is 3742. He received his commission in the Corps of Engineers. Connor graduated from the Army Staff College in 1905 and the Army War College in 1909.

== Military career ==
He began his military career as an officer in the Corps of Engineers. During the Spanish–American War, he served in the Philippines as an engineer and was awarded a Silver Star for heroism in combat.

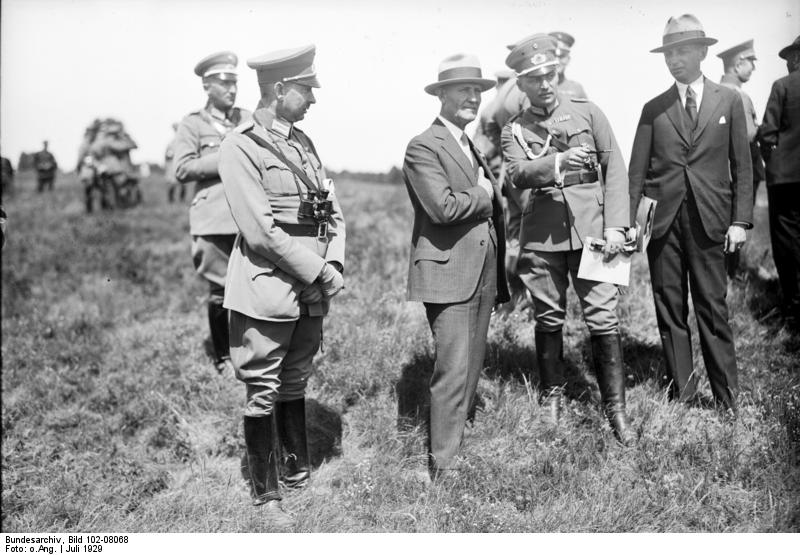
Connor (wearing civilian clothes) inspecting a maneuver of the German Reichswehr in July 1929.

From 1909 to 1916, he was with the War Department General Staff and was promoted to colonel and appointed Deputy Chief of Staff of the American Expeditionary Forces (AEF) in 1917, following the entry of the United States in World War I in April 1917 (see American entry into World War I). In July 1918, he was promoted brigadier general, and given command of the 63rd Brigade, 32nd Division. He led the brigade at the Battle of Château-Thierry in mid-1918, with his performance resulting in him being awarded a second Silver Star, the citation for which reads:

By direction of the President, under the provisions of the act of Congress approved July 9, 1918 (Bul. No. 43, W.D., 1918), Brigadier General William Durward Connor, United States Army, is cited by the Commanding General, American Expeditionary Forces, for gallantry in action and a silver star may be placed upon the ribbon of the Victory Medals awarded him. Brigadier General Connor distinguished himself by gallantry in action while serving as Commanding General, 63d Infantry Brigade, American Expeditionary Forces, in action near Mont St. Martin, France, 3 August 1918, in personally directing and controlling the attack under severe shell fire.

For his World War I service, he was awarded the Army Distinguished Service Medal. The citation for the medal reads:

The President of the United States of America, authorized by Act of Congress, July 9, 1918, takes pleasure in presenting the Army Distinguished Service Medal to Brigadier General William Durward Connor, United States Army, for exceptionally meritorious and distinguished services to the Government of the United States, in a duty of great responsibility during World War I. As Assistant Chief of Staff and Head of the Coordination Section of the General Staff, American Expeditionary Forces, General Conner showed unusual ability and tireless energy. As Chief of Staff of the 32d Division in the trench operations in the Belfort sector and later as Commander of the 63d Infantry Brigade in the advance to the Vesle he displayed particular ability as a leader of troops. He also performed valuable services as commander of a base port and as Chief of Staff of the Services of Supply.

He also received the Order of the Bath from Britain and from France, he received the Croix de guerre and was named a Commander of the Legion of Honour. After the war he served as commanding general of American forces in France until 1920.

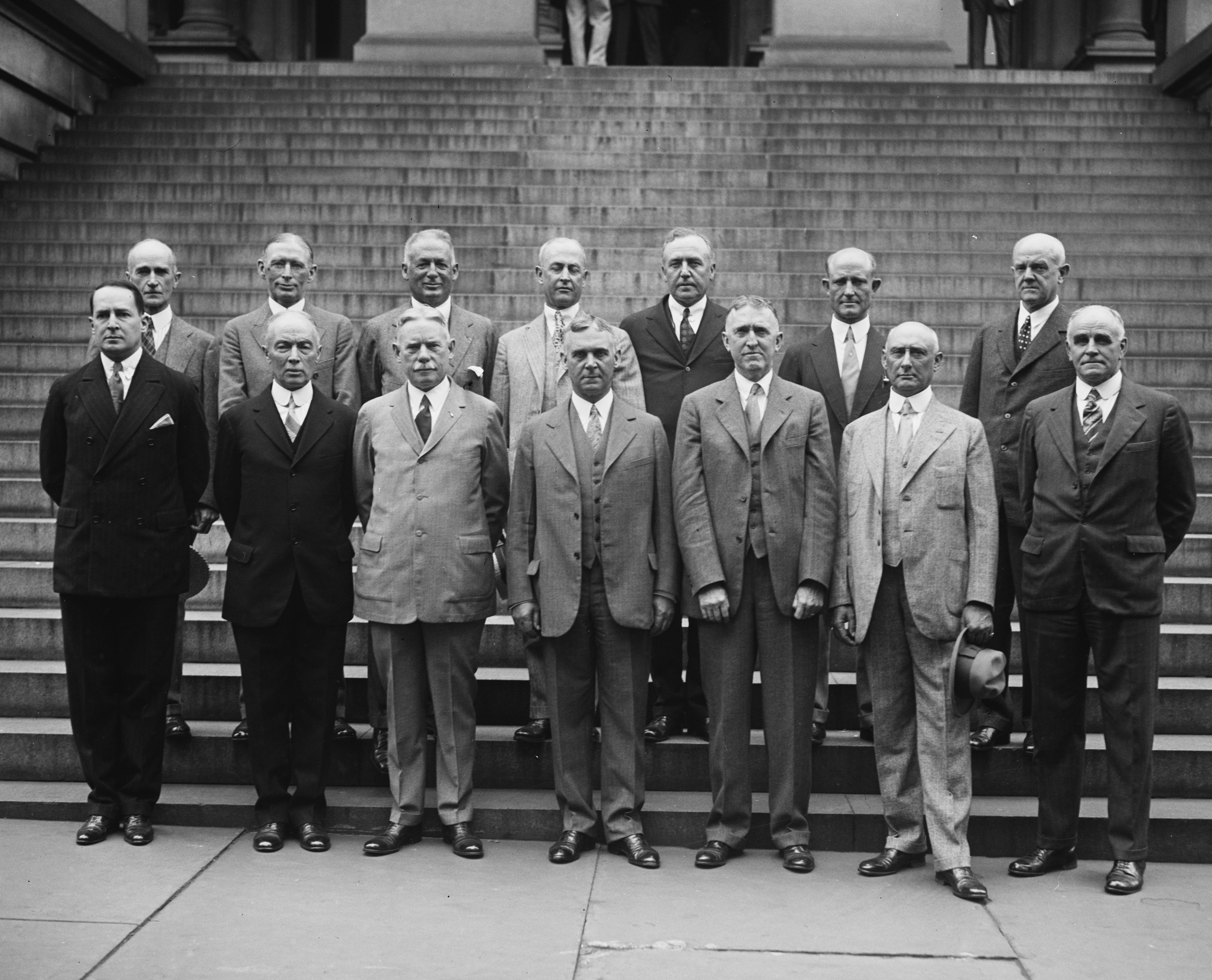
Corps area commanders and division commanders meet with the army chief of staff, Major General Charles Pelot Summerall, at the War Department, May 1927. Stood in the back row, second from the right, is Major General William D. Connor, commanding the 2nd Division.

Returning to the United States, Connor served as commandant of the United States Army Engineer School from April to August 1920. He was then the Chief of Transportation Service in 1921, Deputy Chief of Staff, US Army, in 1922 and commanding general of US Army forces in China, 1923 to 1926. Connor was promoted to major general in 1925, serving as commander of the 2nd Infantry Division until 1927, and as commandant of the Army War College until 1932. He served as the Superintendent at West Point from 1932 to 1938.

== Later life ==
Connor retired from the US Army on 28 February 1938 but was recalled for service during World War II as Chairman of the Construction Advisory Committee, War Department on May 7, 1941. He remained in that capacity until March 31, 1942, when he reverted to the retired status. He died at the age of 86 at Walter Reed Medical Center. and is buried at the West Point Cemetery, section 18, row G, grave 75.

== Notes ==
Military offices
Preceded by Hanson Edward Ely	Commandant of the United States Army War College; 1927–1932	Succeeded by George S. Simonds
Preceded by William Ruthven Smith	Superintendent of the United States Military Academy; 1932–1938	Succeeded by Jay Leland Benedict
