= Botany Worsted Mills Historic District =

Historic district in New Jersey, United States

- U.S. National Register of Historic Places
- U.S. Historic district
- New Jersey Register of Historic Places
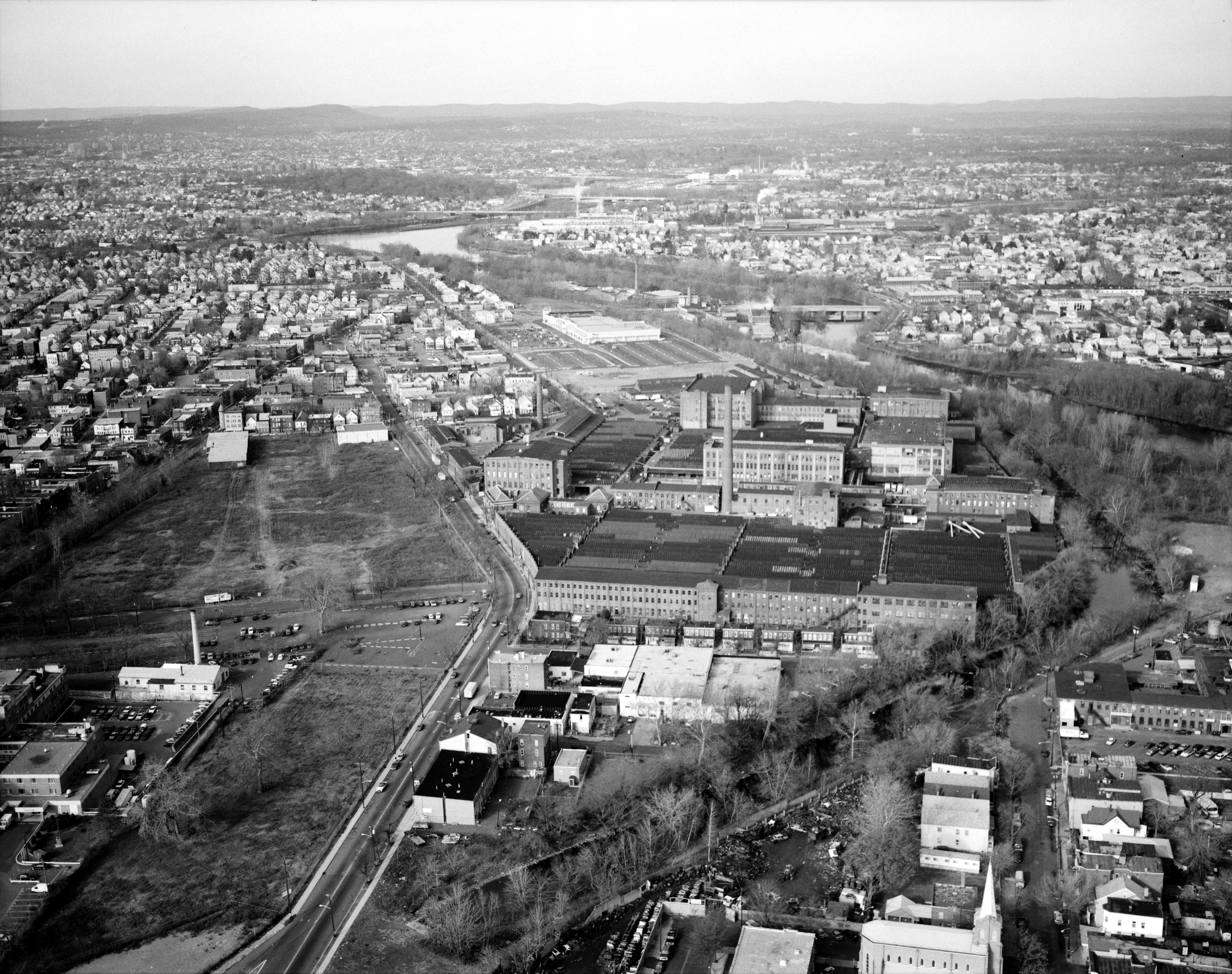
- The mill complex viewed from the south in December, 1997.

- Location within Passaic County, New Jersey Location within New Jersey Location within the United States
- Location: 80-82 and 90 Dayton Avenue and 6-32 Mattimore Street, Passaic, New Jersey
- Coordinates: 40°52′25″N 74°7′10″W
- Area: 26.4 acres (10.7 ha)
- Built: 1889
- Architectural style: Industrial
- NRHP reference No.: 91000928
- NJRHP No.: 2350

Significant dates
- Added to NRHP: July 26, 1991
- Designated NJRHP: June 17, 1991

Botany Worsted Mills Historic District is located in Passaic, Passaic County, New Jersey. The district was added to the National Register of Historic Places on July 26, 1991.
