= Scott Township, Johnson County, Iowa =

Scott Township, Iowa
- Location within Iowa Location within the United States
- Coordinates: 41°38′35″N 91°25′29″W
- Country: United States
- State: Iowa
- County: Johnson
- Elevation: 784 ft (239 m)

Population (2020)
  - Total: 2,175
- Time zone: UTC-6 (Central (CST))
  - Summer (DST): UTC-5 (CDT)

Scott Township is a township in Johnson County, Iowa, United States. As of the 2020 Census, there were 2,175 people in Scott Township.

== History ==
Scott Township was organized in 1846.
