= George R. Allin =

United States Army general

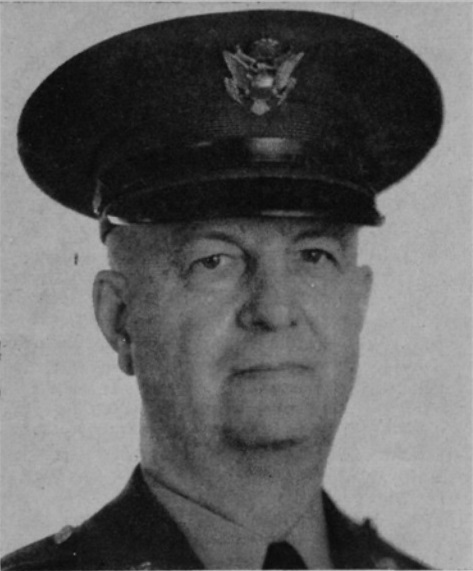
- Assembly magazine, April 1957
- Born: January 15, 1880; Scott Township, Iowa, U.S.
- Died: June 2, 1956 (aged 76); Fort Ord, California, U.S.
- Military career
- Allegiance: United States
- Branch: United States Army
- Service years: 1904–1942
- Rank: Brigadier General
- Service number: 0-1898
- Commands: Field Artillery School
- Conflicts: Pancho Villa Expedition; World War I World War II
- Awards: Army Distinguished Service Medal; Legion of Merit
- Other work: Superintendent Sewanee Military Academy

George R. Allin (January 15, 1880 – June 2, 1956) was an American brigadier general who served during World War I and World War II. He is most noted as commanding general of the Field Artillery School at Fort Sill, Oklahoma, at the beginning of World War II.

== Early life ==
Allin was born in Scott Township, Johnson County, Iowa. He attended the University of Iowa and entered the United States Military Academy with the first contingent of senatorial appointments in 1900. While a cadet, he completed the requirements for a Bachelor of Philosophy degree at the University of Iowa in 1902. He was a cadet first sergeant and later became a cadet captain. He graduated number seventeen of one hundred and twenty-four in the class of 1904. Joseph Stilwell, Robert C. Richardson Jr. and Lesley J. McNair were among his classmates.

== Career ==
Allin was commissioned in the artillery and served at several postings throughout his career. During World War I, he was briefly stationed in France. Between World War I and II, Allin was a graduate from the School of the Line in 1922, the General Staff School in 1923 and the Army War College in 1924. He was an instructor at the United States Military Academy, executive officer for the first Chief of Artillery, temporary brigadier general during World War I, member of the War Department General Staff, Chief of Staff of a corps area, temporary brigadier general during World War II, and commandant of the Field Artillery School where he served from January 20, 1941, to June 30, 1942.

Allin retired in 1942 and was advanced from his permanent rank of colonel to brigadier general on the retired list. He then became superintendent of the Sewanee Military Academy in Sewanee, Tennessee. In 1948, he retired a second time.

== Awards ==
He received the Army Distinguished Service Medal in 1918 and the Legion of Merit in 1942 for his service. The citation for his Army DSM reads:

The President of the United States of America, authorized by Act of Congress, July 9, 1918, takes pleasure in presenting the Army Distinguished Service Medal to Brigadier General George R. Allin, United States Army, for exceptionally meritorious and distinguished services to the Government of the United States, in a duty of great responsibility during World War I. As Executive Officer and Director of Training in the Office of the Chief of Field Artillery from 21 March 1918 to 1 September 1918, by reason of his high professional attainments, ability, foresight, and judgment, General Allin rendered invaluable aid in solving the many complex problems confronting his arm of the service.

== Death and legacy ==
George R. Allin died on June 2, 1956, at the age of seventy-six. Originally buried near his parents in Mason City, Iowa, his remains were reinterred at the West Point Cemetery on December 15, 1987 along with those of his wife Jessie Cooper (Pontius) Allin (1880–1963).

== Bibliography ==
- Ancell, R. Manning; Miller, Christine (1996). The Biographical Dictionary of World War II Generals and Flag Officers: The US Armed Forces. Westport, Connecticut: Greenwood Press. ISBN 0-313-29546-8. OCLC 33862161.
- Armed Forces Journal International. Vol 85. Washington: Army and Navy Journal, inc., 1973.
- Davis, Henry Blaine Jr. (1998). Generals in Khaki. Raleigh, North Carolina: Pentland Press. ISBN 1571970886. OCLC 40298151.
- McKenney, Janice E. The Organizational History of Field Artillery 1775-2003. Washington, D.C.: Center of Military History, United States Army, 2006. OCLC 226255596
