= Thomas M. Robins =

U.S. Army major general (1881–1965)

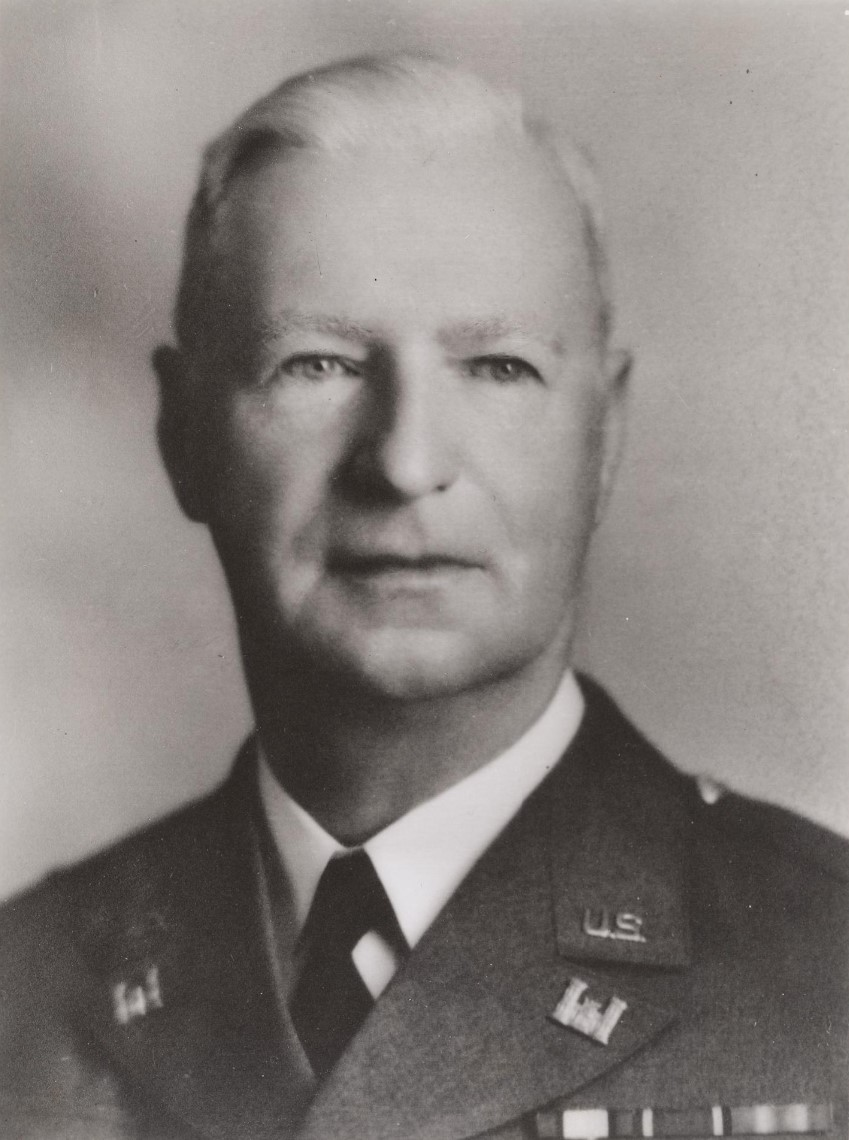
- Robins, c. 1942
- Born: 14 March 1881; Snow Hill, Maryland, U.S.
- Died: 25 May 1965 (aged 84); Lake Oswego, Oregon, U.S.
- Burial place: Willamette National Cemetery, Portland, Oregon, U.S.
- Military career
- Allegiance: United States
- Branch: United States Army Corps of Engineers
- Service years: 1904–1945
- Rank: Major General
- Commands: Civil Works Division; North Pacific Division; Pacific Division; South Pacific Division; 220th Engineer Regiment
- Conflicts: World War I; World War II
- Awards: Army Distinguished Service Medal (2)

Thomas Matthews Robins (14 March 1881 – 25 May 1965) was a United States Army major general. He graduated from the United States Military Academy at West Point, New York, in 1904 and was commissioned in the Corps of Engineers. He served in Cuba and the Philippines, and was the engineer officer and the officer in charge of engineer depot of the Hoboken Port of Embarkation during World War I. He graduated from the Command and General Staff School in 1923 and the Army War College in 1926.

In the 1930s, Robins was division engineer of the Pacific Division from 1931 to 1934 and then Division Engineer of the North Pacific Division, based in Portland, Oregon, until 1938. As such, he oversaw construction of the Bonneville Lock and Dam and developed plans for the Willamette Valley flood control project. During World War II he was responsible for all engineer construction activities in the United States. He retired from active duty in December 1945.

== Early life and career ==
Thomas Matthews Robins was born in Snow Hill, Maryland, on 14 March 1881. He attended Dickinson College from 1897 to 1899. He entered the United States Military Academy at West Point, New York, on 19 June 1900 and graduated on 15 June 1904, ranked eighth in his class. Like the rest of the top ten graduates in his class, he was commissioned as a second lieutenant in the Corps of Engineers; his classmate Lesley J. McNair, ranked eleventh, went into the Field Artillery.

For his first posting, Robins went to the Washington Barracks in Washington, D.C. He then served at Fort Leavenworth, Kansas, as a battalion quartermaster and commissary officer until September 1916. He was promoted to first lieutenant on 9 September 1906 and became a student officer at the Engineer School at the Washington Barracks. He served in Cuba in 1908. In June 1909 he went to the Philippines, where he was in charge of defensive works around Manila. Promoted to captain on 27 February 1912, he returned the Washington Barracks as adjutant of the 1st Battalion of Engineers and Secretary of the Engineer School from March 1912 to November 1914. He married Eleanor Foote Reifsnider on 29 January 1913 at the Ascension Episcopal Church in Westminster, Maryland.

== World War I ==
Robins was in New York City, where he was recorder of the board of engineers and the New York Harbor Line Board, and assistant to Eastern Department Engineer when the American entry into World War I occurred. He was promoted to major on 14 April 1917 and became the engineer officer of the Hoboken Port of Embarkation and the officer in charge of engineer depot there in July. He was promoted to the temporary rank of lieutenant colonel on 5 August 1917 and colonel on 5 January 1918. He was awarded the Army Distinguished Service Medal "for exceptionally meritorious and conspicuous service while in charge of the engineer depot established in connection with the port of New York, and subsequently included in the port of embarkation at Hoboken, New Jersey."

In September 1918, Robins returned to Washington, D.C., where he attended a short wartime course for division staff officers at the Army War College at Washington Barracks. Upon graduation in October, he assumed command of the 220th Engineer Regiment in 20th Division. The end of the war in November cut short this assignment, and in December he returned to New York as the storage officer for the Port of New York. He then became district engineer in New London, Connecticut, in September.

== Between the wars ==
Robins reverted to his substantive rank of major on 6 October 1919 and became district engineer in Providence, Rhode Island. He served in the office of the Chief of Engineers from 7 January 1921 to 1 July 1922 and attended the Command and General Staff School at Fort Leavenworth from 1 September 1922 to 22 June 1923, when he graduated. He then became an assistant professor in the Department of Engineering at West Point from 24 August 1923 to 14 August 1925. He then attended the Army War College from 15 August 1925 to 30 June 1926, and on graduation returned to the office of the Chief of Engineers on 1 July. He was promoted to lieutenant colonel on 29 December 1927.

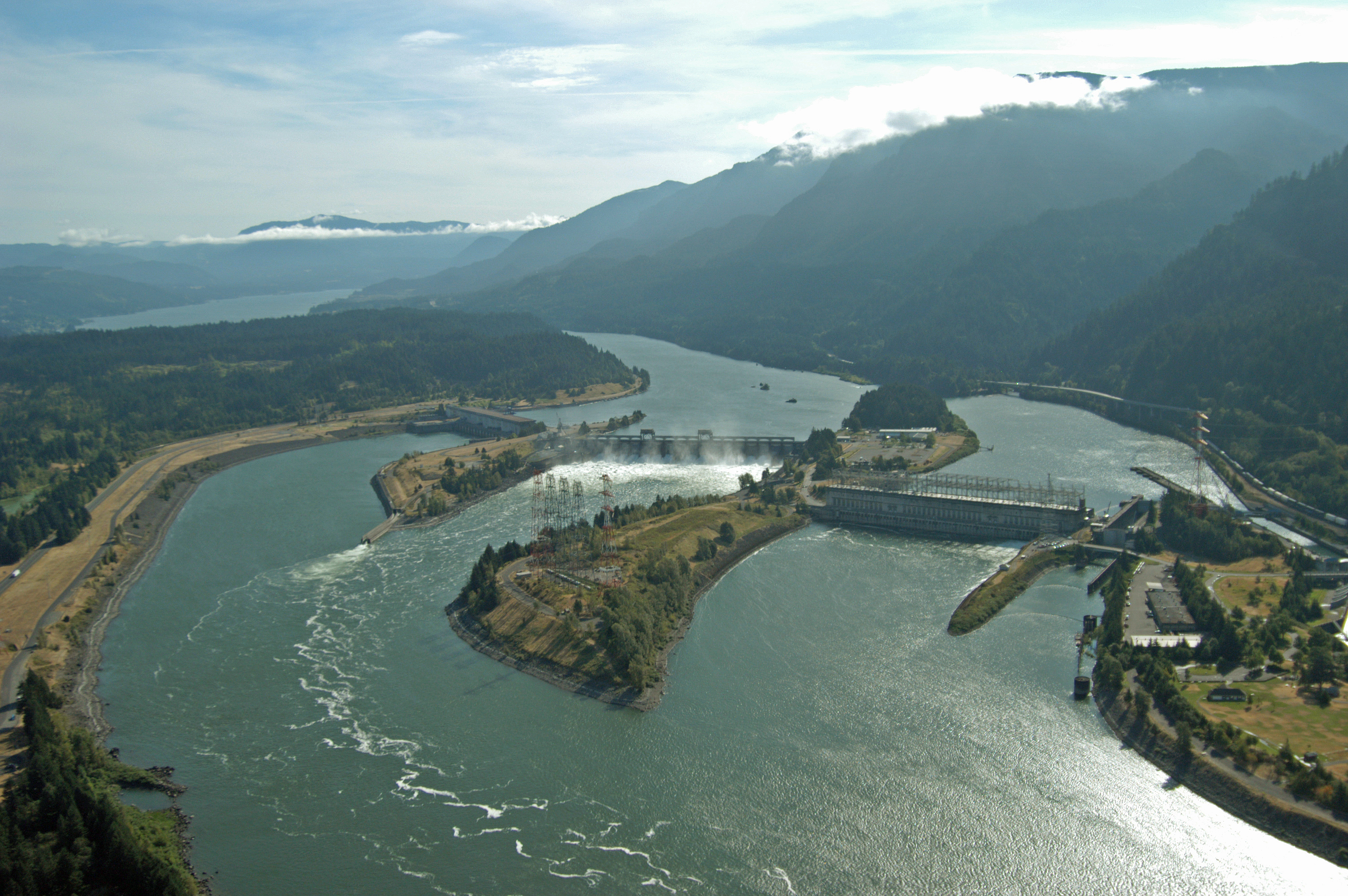
Bonneville Dam looking upstream. The island on the right is called Robins island.

On 30 November 1930, Robins became the South Pacific Division engineer, based in San Francisco, California. He was Division Engineer of the Pacific Division from 31 August 1931 to 29 June 1934 and then Division Engineer of the North Pacific Division, based in Portland, Oregon, until 10 May 1938, with the rank of colonel from 1 April 1935. In this role he worked closely with the Works Progress Administration (WPA), a New Deal agency that employed people on public works projects during the Great Depression.

Major projects undertaken by Robins in the Pacific Northwest included the Bonneville Lock and Dam. Robins oversaw the hiring of key division and district personnel and external contractors, and was involved in the most controversial and politically sensitive decisions of the project, the marketing of electricity, the passage of spawning fish, and inland navigation. He opposed proposals for a common wholesale electricity tariff, which he contended would be too high to attract industries to the region. Critics such as Collier's magazine questioned the need for cheap hydroelectric power in the Pacific Northwest, but they were proven wrong during World War II, when war industries, including the Manhattan Project's Hanford Engineer Works, used up all the available capacity.

Another project was a flood control on the Willamette Valley. In 1931, Robins had submitted a report to Congress that dismissed the need for flood control in the Willamette Valley, but by 1937 he had changed his mind because Congress had since instructed the Corps of Engineers to give primary concern to the economic impact of floods rather than merely their effect on navigation and power generation. Robins reported that a recurrence of the floods of 1861 or 1890 could be catastrophic, and recommended the construction of a series of seven dams. Congress approved the project, and construction commenced in 1939. He also proposed the construction of a series of dams on the Snake River and one on the Columbia River, which came to be called the McNary Dam, but they not authorized until March 1945.

== World War II ==
On 1 September 1939, the day World War II broke out in Europe, Robins became the Assistant Chief of Engineers in charge of the Civil Works Division of the Office of the Chief of Engineers, with the rank of brigadier general. As such, he was responsible for all engineer construction activities in the United States except for fortifications. In November 1940, responsibility for airbase construction was transferred from the Quartermaster Corps to the Corps of Engineers. His first move was to drop "civil" from the division's name. By 30 March 1941, Robins had taken over eighty-one projects worth $200 million (equivalent to $4,600 million in 2025). During the changeover he worked closely with the head of the Construction Division of the Quartermaster Corps, Brigadier General Brehon B. Somervell. Robins became responsible not just for Air Corps construction, but for designing and building airports for the Civil Aeronautics Authority.

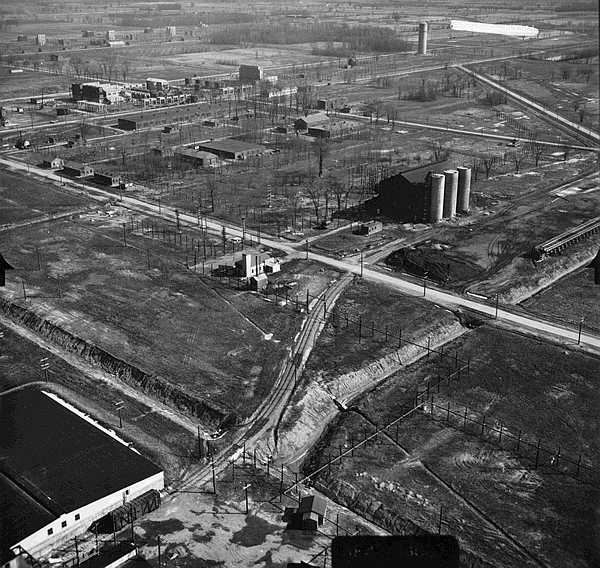
The Lake Ontario Ordnance Works in 1944

The construction program for the Air Corps soon increased in size, with sixteen new projects added by 1 April 1941. These included four aircraft assembly plants worth $37.2 million (equivalent to $800 million in 2025) and eight pilot training schools in the Southern and Southwestern states. In keeping with the standard practice of the Corps of Engineers, Robins concerned himself with matters of policy and administration, leaving the day-to-day task of supervising and managing construction to the division and district engineers. He imposed the work and financial practices on Air Corps projects that had been developed for, and proven successful on, river and harbor projects. Along with Somervell, he arranged for restrictions to be lifted to give the officers in the field the authority to deviate from standard plans.

With the prospect of mobilizing and training an enormous army fast approaching, Robins became involved in preparations for the construction of the necessary cantonments. In March 1941, he became a member of the War Department Facilities Board, which selected sites for ammunition plants. It had been the practice of the Air Corps to accept tracts of land donated by communities, but many of these sites were often poor and challenging from a construction point of view. New procedures were implemented for site selection for airbases, but in practice the Chief of Engineers, Major General Eugene Reybold, would not accept a site unless Robins approved it. Robins also headed a panel that drastically reduced the standard cost-plus contract fees for construction and engineer-architect work.

In December 1941, the remaining construction functions of the Quartermaster Corps were transferred to the Corps of Engineers. On 7 December, the Japanese attack on Pearl Harbor brought the United States into the war. Money was now no object; the priority was to expedite construction work. On 17 December, approval was granted for $827,820,000 (equivalent to $1.8120268×10^{10} in 2025) and $388,000,000 (equivalent to $8.492986×10^{9} in 2025) for expediting production. Orders soon came in for the construction of massive industrial facilities like the Lake Ontario Ordnance Works to produce TNT and the Wabash River Ordnance Works to produce the new RDX explosive. On 12 December, Robins suspended regulations requiring bids on materials. and gave the division engineers authority to execute contracts of up to $5 million (equivalent to $109 million in 2025) and districts to make agreements of up to $2 million (equivalent to $44 million in 2025).

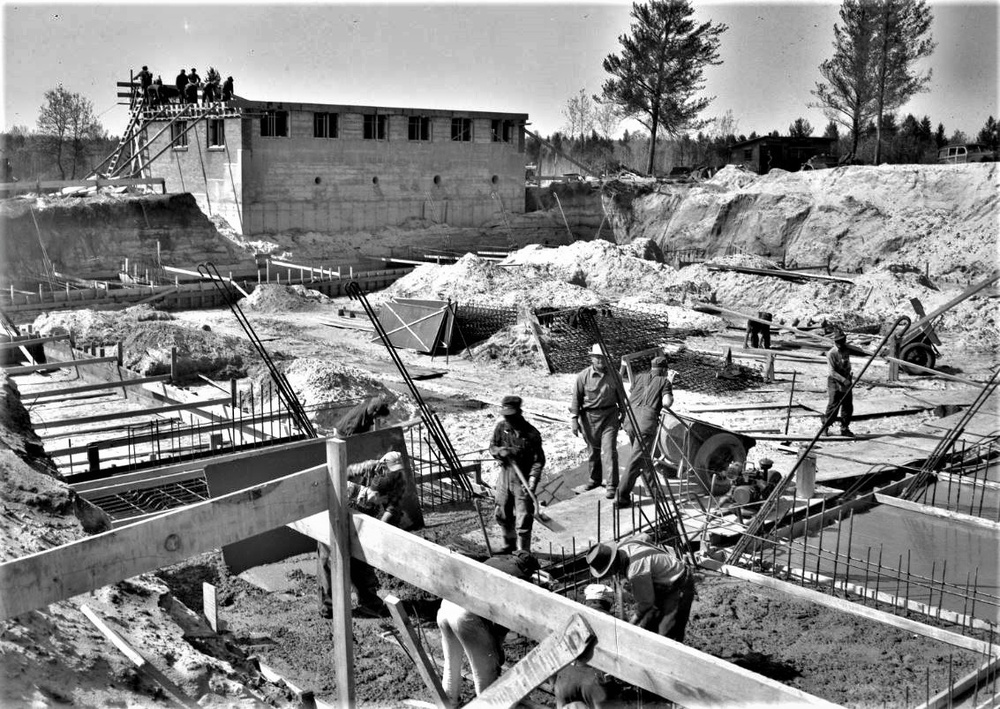
Camp McCoy, Wisconsin, under construction in 1942

On 13 December, the Construction Division moved into the Railroad Retirement Board Building. Robins occupied Somervell's old suite. He retained all of Somervell's branch chiefs and Somerbvell's deputy, Colonel Wilhelm D. Styer, became his. On 9 March 1942, the Services of Supply (SOS) was created under Somervell, who was advanced to lieutenant general, and the Corps of Engineers became an operating division of the SOS. Styer became Somervell's chief of staff, and Colonel Leslie R. Groves, who had headed the Robins's Operations Branch, became his deputy.

In June 1942, a new engineer district was created under Colonel James C. Marshall, which officially became the Manhattan District on 13 August 1942. Robins directed all other districts to give Marshall priority for any surplus personnel they might have. On 23 September, Groves became the director of the Development of Substitute Materials project, which became better known as the Manhattan Project, although Groves remained Robins's deputy until mid-1943. Robins expressed his sympathy. He scoured the Corps for personnel, equipment and supplies for the new district, and was involved in authorizing the acquisition of land for the Clinton Engineer Works in Tennessee, the Hanford Engineer Works in Washington state, and Project Y in New Mexico.

Robins became the Deputy Chief of Engineers on 1 November 1943. He reached the mandatory retirement age of 64 in March 1945, and retired from the Army with his substantive rank of brigadier general at the end of the month, although he remained on active duty with the temporary rank of major general until 31 December. He was awarded a bronze oak leaf cluster to his Distinguished Service Medal "for exceptionally meritorious and distinguished services to the Government of the United States, in a duty of great responsibility as Deputy Chief Engineer from 1943 to 1945." On 16 March 1948, he was promoted to major general on the retired list.

== Death ==
Robins returned to Portland, Oregon, where he became a consulting engineer. He worked on projects such as the Yale Dam, Pelton Dam, and the dams of the Idaho Power Company. He died at Lake Oswego, Oregon, on 25 May 1965, and was buried in the Willamette National Cemetery in Portland, Oregon, alongside his wife Eleanor, who had died on 21 May 1964. His papers are held by the University of Oregon Libraries, Special Collections and University Archives.

== Dates of rank ==
Insignia	Rank	Component	Date	Reference
	Second Lieutenant	Corps of Engineers	15 June 1904	
	First Lieutenant	Corps of Engineers	9 September 1906	
	Captain	Corps of Engineers	27 February 1912	
	Major	Corps of Engineers	14 April 1917	
	Lieutenant Colonel (temporary)	Corps of Engineers	5 August 1917	
	Colonel (temporary)	Corps of Engineers	5 January 1918	
	Major (reverted)	Corps of Engineers	6 October 1919	
	Lieutenant Colonel	Corps of Engineers	29 December 1927	
	Colonel	Corps of Engineers	1 April 1935	
	Brigadier General	Corps of Engineers	1 September 1939	
	Major General	Army of the United States	28 January 1942	
	Brigadier General	Retired	31 March 1945	
	Major General	Retired	16 August 1948	
