= Pelham D. Glassford =

United States Army general

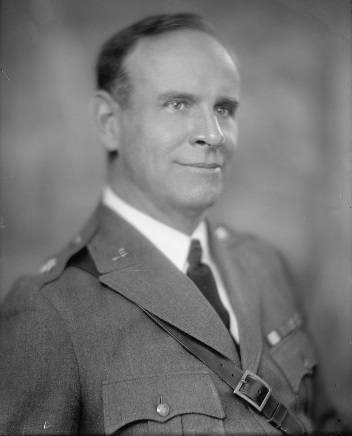
- Glassford as a brigadier general during World War I.
- Born: August 8, 1883; Las Vegas, New Mexico, U.S.
- Died: August 9, 1959 (aged 76); Laguna Beach, California, U.S.
- Burial place: Fort Rosecrans National Cemetery, San Diego, California, U.S.
- Relatives: William A. Glassford (brother)
- Military career
- Allegiance: United States
- Branch: United States Army
- Service years: 1904–1931; 1942–1943
- Rank: Brigadier General
- Nicknames: Happy, Hap
- Service number: 0-1899
- Unit: United States Army Field Artillery Branch
- Commands: I Corps Field Artillery School; American Expeditionary Forces Field Artillery School, Saumur, France; 103rd Field Artillery Regiment; 51st Field Artillery Brigade, 26th Division; 152nd Field Artillery Brigade, 77th Division; 1st Field Artillery Regiment
- Conflicts: Pancho Villa Expedition; World War I World War II
- Awards: Distinguished Service Medal; Silver Star; Legion of Merit; Purple Heart
- Other work: Superintendent, Metropolitan Police Department of the District of Columbia; Chief, Phoenix Police Department

Pelham Davis Glassford (August 8, 1883 – August 9, 1959) was a United States Army officer who attained the rank of brigadier general during World War I. He later served as Superintendent of the District of Columbia Police Department, and was held responsible by the Board of Commissioners for the District of Columbia for the violence that ended the 1932 Bonus Army protests.

The son of a career Army officer, Glassford graduated from the United States Military Academy in 1904 and was commissioned in the Field Artillery. His early assignments included the 1st Field Artillery Regiment at Fort Riley, the West Point faculty and 1st Field Artillery postings to the Philippines and Hawaii. In 1916 and 1917 he served with the 5th Field Artillery during the Pancho Villa Expedition.

During World War I, Glassford directed two artillery schools in France, commanded a Field Artillery regiment, and then commanded a Field Artillery brigade. He was promoted to brigadier general in 1918, and was the Army's youngest general officer at the time. After the war, Glassford commanded a Field Artillery Brigade in the Army of Occupation. He also graduated from the Army War College, served in several staff and faculty assignments, and commanded the 1st Field Artillery Regiment. He retired from the Army in 1931.

Following his military retirement, Glassford was Superintendent of the District of Columbia Police, a position he resigned because of disagreement over the actions taken against the Bonus Army in 1932. He subsequently served briefly as chief of police in Phoenix, and was a federal labor-management mediator in California. During World War II, Glassford returned to active duty and served for nearly two years in the office of the Provost Marshal General.

== Early life ==
Glassford was born in Las Vegas, New Mexico, on August 8, 1883, the son of Allie (Seymour) Glassford and Army officer William A. Glassford. He graduated from West Point in 1904 ranked 18th of 124 graduates, and was commissioned as a second lieutenant of Field Artillery.

== Start of career ==
After his initial service at Fort Riley, Kansas, in 1907 Glassford was promoted to first lieutenant and graduated from the Mounted Service School. He was then posted to West Point to serve on the faculty as an instructor in the department of drawing.

From 1911 to 1913, Glassford served in the Philippines with the 1st Field Artillery Regiment. In 1913 he was assigned to Hawaii with the 1st Field Artillery, and in 1914 he was promoted to captain.

In 1916 and 1917, Glassford served on the US-Mexico border with the 5th Field Artillery during the Pancho Villa Expedition. At the start of World War I, he was promoted to major and assigned as adjutant of the 5th Field Artillery during its premobilization training.

== World War I ==
Upon arrival in France with his regiment, Glassford was promoted to temporary lieutenant colonel and assigned as secretary of the Field Artillery School of Instruction in Saumur. He was subsequently assigned as director of the I Corps field artillery school. In early 1918, Glassford returned to the Saumur school as commandant, and he served until he was promoted to temporary colonel and named commander of the 103rd Field Artillery Regiment in June.

Glassford commanded the 103rd Field Artillery until August, and took part in several battles, including Xivray-et-Marvoisin, the Second Battle of the Marne, the Battle of Château-Thierry, and the Meuse–Argonne offensive. He was wounded in September, but continued in command.

In October, Glassford was promoted to temporary brigadier general and assigned to command the 51st Field Artillery Brigade, 26th Division; at the time of this promotion, he was, the youngest general officer in the U.S. Army. During the war, Glassford became known for riding a motorcycle between his subordinate units so he could perform reconnaissance and conduct command and control based on personal observations rather than reports to a command post. Glassford trained his brigade to become proficient in the technique of reloading on a cannon's recoil; while this practice posed risk to crew members who might be injured by the moving recoil mechanism, it enabled 26th Division artillery crews to shoot so fast that German soldiers were convinced the Americans had automatic fire artillery pieces.

== Post-World War I ==
Glassford commanded the 51st Field Artillery Brigade until February 1919, when he was assigned to command the 152nd Field Artillery Brigade, a unit of the 77th Division. He returned to the United States with his brigade in July, reverted to his permanent rank of major, and was assigned to the office of the Chief of Field Artillery. Later that year he was assigned to the faculty of the General Service Schools at Ft. Leavenworth.

In 1924, Glassford graduated from the Army War College, after which he remained at the school to serve on the faculty. In 1927 and 1928, Glassford commanded the 1st Field Artillery Regiment at Fort Sill.

Glassford subsequently returned to the War Department staff and served as chief of the Mobilization Branch in the Operations and Training Division. He was promoted to lieutenant colonel in 1928. Glassford retired in July 1931, and his rank of brigadier general was restored at his retirement as the result of a 1930 law which enabled World War I generals to retire at the highest rank they had held.

During his career, Glassford was known for his out of the ordinary excursions into fields outside the Army. He would frequently save his military leave, and then use it in large blocs to take long motorcycle trips or work in jobs that were atypical for a military professional, which included circus barker and newspaper reporter.

== Later career ==
=== Washington, DC police chief ===
In November 1931, Glassford was appointed Superintendent of the District of Columbia's Metropolitan Police Department. Known for his sense of humor, when queried by a reporter as to his qualifications for the job, Glassford quipped: "Well, I've been arrested. Once for driving through a red light and once for speeding on a motorcycle." His tenure was most notable for the Summer 1932 response to the Bonus Army, World War I veterans who converged on Washington during the Great Depression to advocate for early payment of bonuses that were scheduled to be paid in 1945.

Members of the Bonus Army established encampments in and around the District of Columbia. Glassford worked to accommodate them, visiting their leaders daily by motorcycle to help maintain order, and arranging for volunteers to provide medical care, as well as donations of food, clothing, tents, and other supplies. Favorable Congressional action was not forthcoming, and many Bonus Army members accepted the government's offer of free transportation home. President Herbert Hoover ordered the remaining veterans to be removed, by force if necessary. Glassford managed to obtain a six-day extension before enforcement, hoping to persuade the Bonus Army members to depart voluntarily. On July 28, U.S. Attorney General William D. Mitchell ordered the veterans who remained to be removed from government property. Glassford's police began to execute the order; they were met with resistance, and during an exchange of shots, two veterans were wounded and later died.

After the shooting, President Herbert Hoover ordered the Army to force the veterans' out of the Washington area. General Douglas MacArthur, the Chief of Staff of the Army, took personal command of infantry and cavalry units, which were supported by six tanks. The Army forcibly ejected the Bonus Army members, and wives and children who had accompanied some of them were also forced to leave. The Army then burned the campsites.

Glassford had established a positive relationship with leaders of the Bonus Army, and disagreed with Hoover and Mitchell about the need to eject the members and destroy the campsites. He also disagreed with the need to use Army troops against the Bonus Army, which brought him into conflict with other members of the police department leadership. The Board of Commissioners for the District of Columbia held Glassford responsible for the violence and refused to allow him to name appointees who agreed with his policies. In response, he submitted his resignation, and left the police department in December 1932.

=== Move to Arizona ===
Glassford retired to a farm near Phoenix. He mounted a brief run for president of the Salt River Valley Water Users' Association, and also that year accepted a federal appointment to mediate labor-management disputes between workers and owners of lettuce and cantaloupe farms in Imperial Valley, California. Faced with workers striking in an effort to obtain better pay and working conditions, conservative farm owners resorted to violence, spying on attorneys sent to California to aid the workers, and propaganda asserting that the strike was communist-inspired. Though Glassford was initially sympathetic to the farm owners, their tactics caused him to come down on the side of the workers.

=== Phoenix police chief ===
In March 1936, Glassford was hired to serve as chief of the Phoenix Police Department for 90 days. The temporary appointment came with a mandate to reorganize and reform the department to end corruption and outside political influence, and restore morale. He left the position on May 1, when a new mayor and city council took office and decided on a different reorganization plan. In September 1936, Glassford was an unsuccessful candidate for the Democratic nomination in Arizona's 1st congressional district.

== World War II ==
In March 1942, Glassford was recalled to active duty for World War II and assigned to duty as internal security director in the office of the Provost Marshal General. He retired again in December 1943.

== Awards ==
Glassford was a recipient of the Distinguished Service Medal, Silver Star, Legion of Merit, and Purple Heart.

== Career as artist ==
Glassford was an artist; among friends in the military, he was well known for his paintings of fireplace screens. After his military retirement, he worked primarily in watercolors; his second wife and he resided in Laguna Beach, California, and many of Glassford's paintings depicted scenes of Newport Beach, Balboa Harbor and other areas of the southern California coast.

== Death and burial ==
Glassford died in Laguna Beach on August 9, 1959. He was buried at Fort Rosecrans National Cemetery in San Diego.

== Family ==
In 1908, Glassford married Cora Carleton, the daughter of Major General Guy Carleton. They were the parents of four children: Guy Carleton (1908–1974), Cora Elizabeth (Mrs. Lee Parke) (1910–1986), Pelham Davis (1911–1992), and Dorothy Seymour (Mrs. William Graham) (1913–1977).

The Glassfords divorced in 1932. In 1934, Pelham Glassford married Lucille Painter (1906–1957).

Glassford's brother William A. Glassford, was a graduate of the United States Naval Academy who attained the rank of vice admiral before retiring in 1946.

== Biography ==
Cora Carleton Glassford prepared a biography of her husband, One Life is Not Enough, the manuscript for which is part of the Cora Carleton Glassford Papers. Cora Carleton Glassford's papers are included in the collections of the Daughters of the Republic of Texas Library.

== Dates of rank ==
Insignia	Rank	Component	Date
No insignia	Cadet	United States Military Academy	1 August 1900
No pin insignia at the time	Second lieutenant	Regular Army	15 June 1904
	First lieutenant	Regular Army	25 January 1907
	Captain	Regular Army	18 November 1914
	Major	Regular Army	4 June 1917
	Lieutenant colonel	National Army	5 August (accepted 27 August) 1917
	Colonel	National Army	26 June (accepted 5 July) 1918
	Brigadier general	United States Army	1 October (accepted 17 October) 1918
	Lieutenant colonel	Regular Army	6 March 1928
	Brigadier general	Regular Army, Retired	31 July 1931
	Colonel	Army of the United States	1 February 1942
	Brigadier general	Regular Army, Retired	25 December 1943

== Sources ==
=== Books ===
- Davis, Henry Blaine Jr. (1998). Generals in Khaki. Raleigh, NC: Pentland Press. pp. 144–145, 148. ISBN 978-1-57197-088-6.
- Olmstead, Kathryn S. (2015). Right Out of California: The 1930s and the Big Business Roots of Modern Conservatism. New York, NY: The New Press. pp. 135–136. ISBN 978-1-62097-096-6.
- Benwall, Harry A. (1919). History of the Yankee Division. Boston, MA: Cornhill Company. pp. 43–44.
- Dickson, Paul; Allen, Thomas B. (2004). The Bonus Army: An American Epic. New York, NY: Walker & Company. p. 15. ISBN 978-0-8027-7738-6.

=== Newspapers ===
- "Glassford To Leave Post In Washington". The Sheboygan Press. Sheboygan, WI. Associated Press. October 20, 1932. pp. 1, 19 – via Newspapers.com.
- "Ticket Heads Talk Tonight". Arizona Republic. Phoenix, AZ. March 22, 1934. p. 11.
- "Glassford is Named". Palm Beach Post. West Palm Beach, FL. Associated Press. March 28, 1934. p. 5.
- "Gen. Glassford Weds Arizona Girl". Oakland Tribune. Oakland, CA. Associated Press. September 6, 1934. p. 2.
- "Glassford is Named New Chief". Arizona Republic. Phoenix, AZ. March 15, 1936. p. 1.
- "New City Officials Take Helm". Arizona Republic. Phoenix, AZ. May 1, 1936. p. 1.
- "Political 'Infant' Leads in Arizona". Salt Lake Tribune. Salt Lake City, UT. Associated Press. September 10, 1936. p. 1.
- "Call Answered by Glassford". Arizona Republic. Phoenix, AZ. Associated Press. March 6, 1942. p. 2.
- "Retirement Set for Glassford". Arizona Republic. Phoenix, AZ. December 18, 1943. p. 2.
- "Admiral Glassford Returns to Phoenix for Brief Visit". Arizona Republic. Phoenix, AZ. May 30, 1956. p. 2.
- "Death Takes Glassford in Coast Town". Arizona Republic. Phoenix, AZ. August 10, 1959. p. 1.

=== Internet ===
- "Biography, Pelham D. Glassford". Metropolitan Police Department. Washington, DC: Government of the District of Columbia.
- "Biography, Pelham D. Glassford". askART.com. Eugene, OR: Pacific University.
- Dickson, Paul; Allen, Thomas B. (February 1, 2003). "Marching on History: When a "Bonus Army" of World War I veterans converged on Washington, MacArthur, Eisenhower and Patton were there to meet them". Smithsonian Magazine. Washington, DC: Smithsonian.com.
- Glassford, Cora Carleton. "Col. 892 Cora Carleton Glassford Papers, 1862-1958". www.drtl.org. Austin, TX: Daughters of the Republic of Texas. Archived from the original on April 24, 2016.
- Lehmann, Chris (October 6, 2015). "How California Birthed the Modern Right Wing: Many of 20th-century conservatism's tricks were honed in 1930s agribusiness's fight against farmworkers". In These Times. Chicago, IL: inthesetimes.com.
