= Jay Leland Benedict =

United States Army general

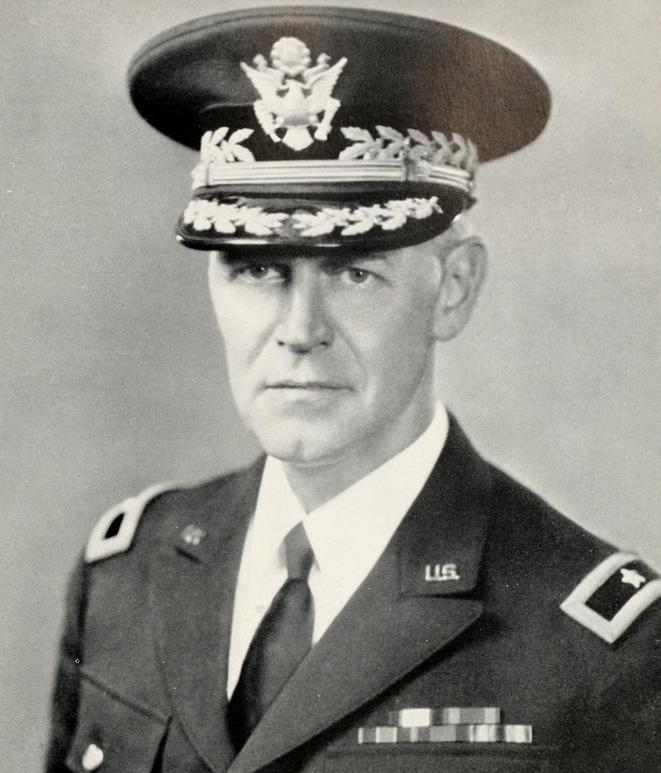
- Born: April 14, 1882; Hastings, Nebraska, U.S.
- Died: September 16, 1953 (aged 71)
- Buried: Arlington National Cemetery
- Allegiance: United States of America
- Branch: United States Army
- Service years: 1904–1946
- Rank: Major general
- Commands: 12th Infantry Regiment (United States); Superintendent, United States Military Academy
- Awards: Distinguished Service Medal; Legion of Merit

Jay Leland Benedict (April 14, 1882 – September 16, 1953) was a United States Army major general and superintendent of the United States Military Academy (1938–1940).

== Career ==
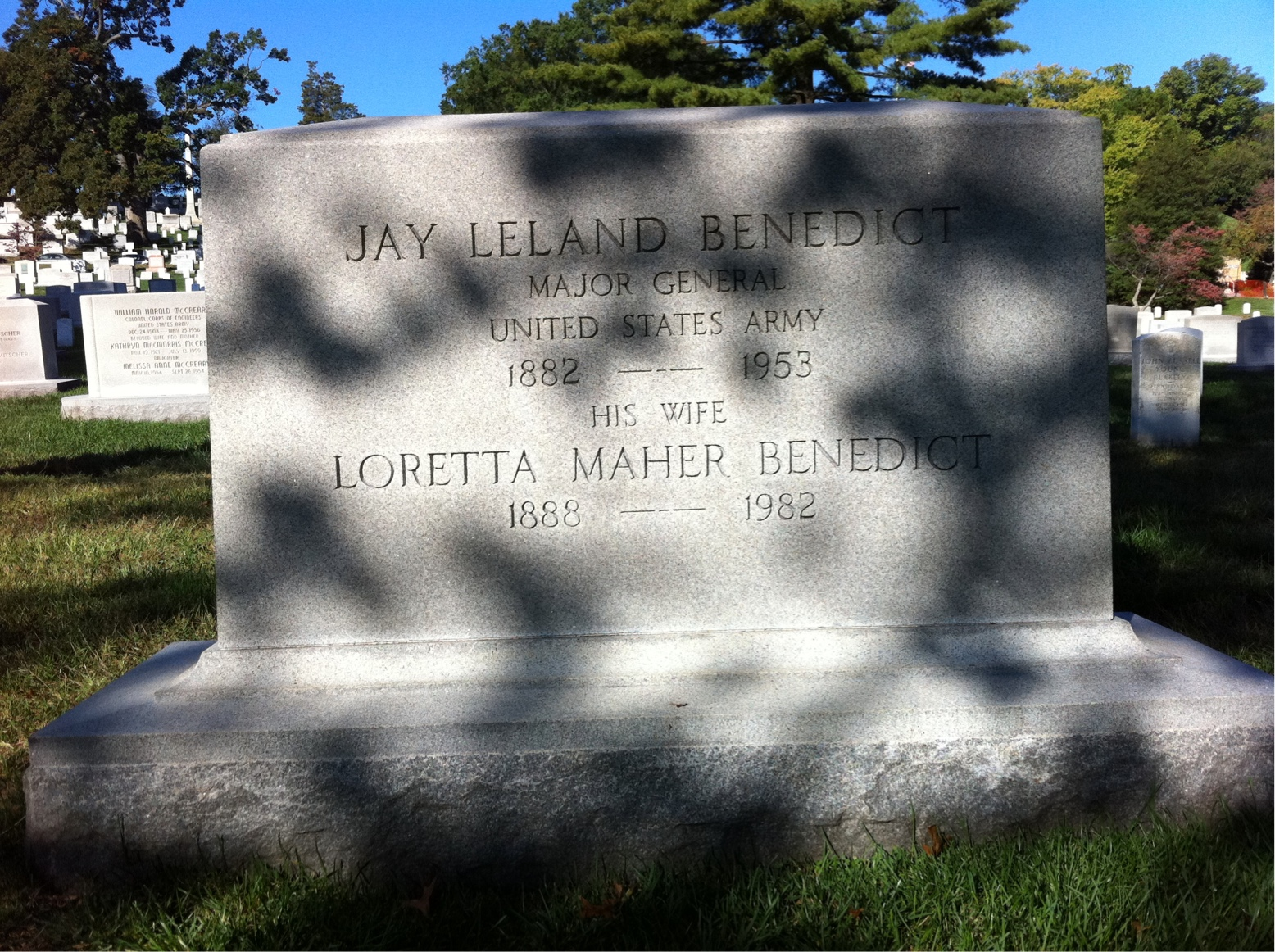
Grave at Arlington National Cemetery

Benedict received an appointment to West Point as a member of the class of 1904. He was commissioned as a field artillery officer and served on several staffs, serving as a 2nd lieutenant in the Secret Service Agent (1908) and graduating from the Army War College in 1926. After serving as executive officer for the 16th Infantry Regiment (United States) at Fort Jay, New York, he commanded the 12th Infantry Regiment (United States) at Fort Howard, Maryland in 1936. Positions held included: Army major general and superintendent (from 1938 to 1940). He commanded the Ninth Area Service Command from November 1941 to April 1942. He served on the War Department General Staff during World War II. Legion Of Merit Award For As Procurement And Discharge Section In G- (between 1942 and 1946).

== Decorations ==

1st Row	Army Distinguished Service Medal			
2nd Row	Legion of Merit	Spanish Campaign Medal	Army of Cuban Occupation Medal	Mexican Border Service Medal
3rd Row	World War I Victory Medal	American Defense Service Medal	American Campaign Medal	World War II Victory Medal

== Personal life ==
Benedict was born in Hastings, Nebraska, In 1907 he married Genevieve Ardell Goldstein and in 1924 married Loretta Katherine Maher. He died in Arlington, Virginia at the age of 71 and was buried in Section 2 Site 4961-Arlington National Cemetery, Virginia.

Military offices
Preceded by William Durward Connor	Superintendents of the United States Military Academy; 1938–1940	Succeeded by Robert L. Eichelberger
