= Robert C. Richardson Jr. =

United States Army general

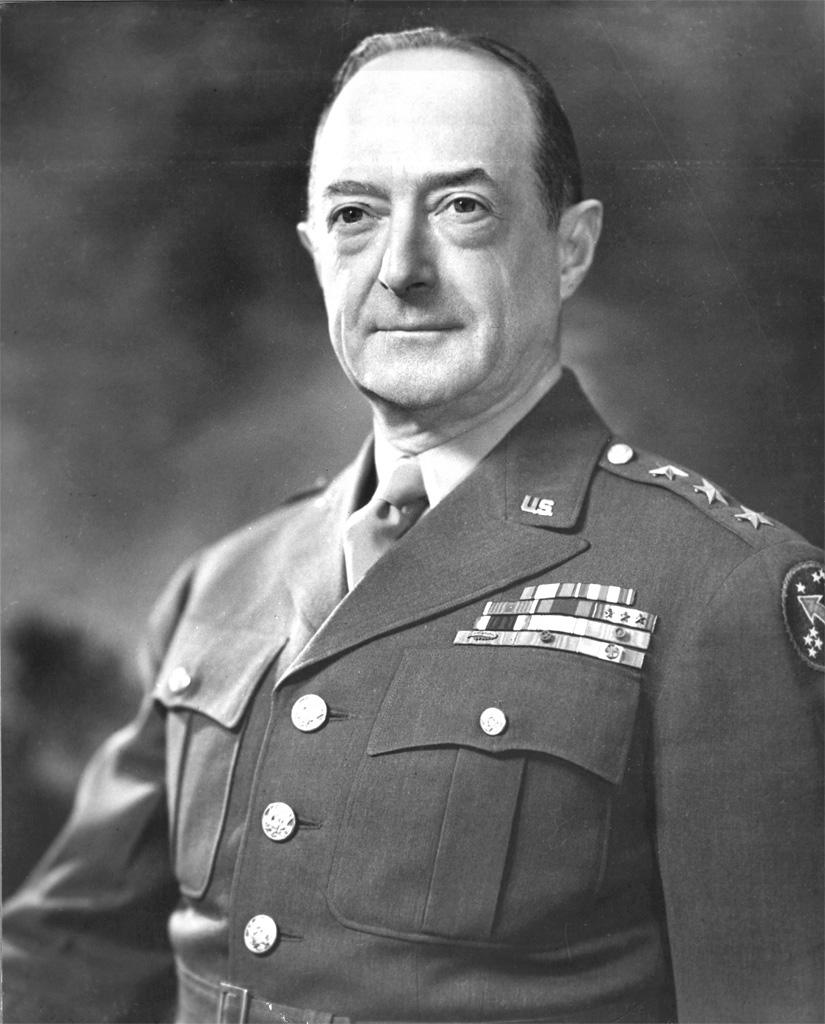
- General Robert C. Richardson Jr.
- Born: 27 October 1882; Charleston, South Carolina, U.S.
- Died: 2 March 1954 (aged 71); Rome, Italy
- Burial place: United States Military Academy Cemetery
- Spouse(s): Lois Farman Richardson (m. 1916-her death, 1951)
- Relatives: Brigadier General Robert C. Richardson III, USAF (son)
- Military career
- Allegiance: United States
- Branch: United States Army
- Service years: 1904–1946
- Rank: General
- Service number: 0-1903
- Unit: Cavalry Branch
- Commands: U.S. Army Pacific Command; VII Corps; 1st Cavalry Division
- Conflicts: Philippine–American War; World War I World War II
- Awards: Legion of Merit; Silver Star; Purple Heart; Legion of Honor

Robert Charlwood Richardson Jr. (27 October 1882 – 2 March 1954) was a decorated United States Army general whose career spanned the first half of the 20th century, including service in the Philippine insurrection, World War I, and World War II. During World War II, he was commanding general of U.S. Army Forces in the Pacific Ocean Areas and military governor of the Territory of Hawaii.

Commissioned from the United States Military Academy in 1904, Richardson also attended the University of Grenoble, France, as well as the United States Army War College. During World War I he was a liaison officer in the American Expeditionary Force. Afterward he was a military attaché with the U.S. Embassy in Rome. He was the author of "West Point-An Intimate Picture of the National Military Academy".

Prior to World War II, Richardson commanded the 1st Cavalry Division from 1940 to 1941. He then directed the War Department Bureau of Public Relations before becoming commanding general of the VII Corps in Alabama, moving it to set up the defense of California immediately following the Japanese attack on Pearl Harbor. In 1943 he was made Commanding General of the Hawaiian Department, Military Governor of Hawaii, and all Army personnel in the Pacific Ocean and Mid-Pacific Areas. As Commander of all Pacific Army personnel, he had administrative or what is called UCMJ authority of all Army units, while tactical or what is called today operational Joint control fell to Fleet Admiral Chester W. Nimitz. He was responsible for all Army disciplinary, training, and tactical unit preparations. He was the first senior Army general officer to ever serve as Joint forces subordinate commander under a non-Army flag officer, Fleet Admiral Nimitz.

== Early career ==
Upon graduation from the United States Military Academy at West Point and commission into the U.S. Cavalry as a second lieutenant, Richardson was ordered to the Philippine Islands to join the 14th Cavalry. He served in the field against the hostile Moro tribesmen at Jolo during the Philippine War guerrilla insurrection. He was wounded in action at Cotta Usap on 7 January 1905, and was awarded the Purple Heart for wounds and the Silver Star award for gallantry in action. He subsequently participated in various other engagements against the insurgents until he left his regiment on 21 October 1905. Returning to the United States, he was with the 14th Cavalry at the Presidio of San Francisco, California when the 1906 earthquake struck; he led his cavalry troop from the Presidio as part of the Government’s response to the earthquake and subsequent firestorm.

On 25 October 1906, he returned to West Point as an Assistant Instructor of Modern Languages until 13 August 1911. First Lieutenant Richardson returned to San Francisco until 4 October, when he sailed for a second tour in the Philippines with the 14th Cavalry at Camp Stotsenburg. On 4 March 1912, he returned to the United States to join the 23rd Infantry at Texas City and Fort Clark, Texas. In August 1914, he started a second tour at West Point as Assistant Professor of English, until June 1917.

Richardson married Lois Elbertine Farman (b. 1884) on 18 November 1916, in Wyoming, New York. The couple had one son, Robert C. Richardson III. They spent the later years of their lives in Upper Village, Bath, New Hampshire. The couple were close personal friends of Rose Standish Nichols.

== World War I and post-Great War Europe ==
In June 1917, Captain Richardson was assigned to the 2nd Cavalry Regiment at Fort Ethan Allen, Vermont and on 9 July, was appointed aide to Major General Thomas H. Barry, who commanded the Central Department with headquarters at Chicago, Illinois. Richardson helped in the rapid buildup and training of the American Expeditionary Force (AEF) that was preparing to go to France. Richardson, a temporary major, sailed with Barry to France from New York on 1 December 1917. Fluent in French, Richardson served as an aide and observer with foreign armies until 9 January 1918. On 14 June, he was assigned to the Operations Division of the General Staff, AEF, as liaison officer for G.H.Q. Allied Headquarters and with American Armies, Corps, and Divisions during the combat operations of 1918. He escorted Allied missions in St. Mihiel Offensive. By now a temporary lieutenant colonel, Richardson was liaison officer with Headquarters, First United States Army, for the opening of the Meuse-Argonne Offensive and also served as the operations officer representative at Advance G.H.Q. With the end of hostilities and now a temporary colonel, Richardson joined the Reparations Board, Peace Commission, in Paris from January 28 to February 28, 1919. As part of the Occupation of the Rhineland, Colonel Richardson served on temporary duty at Headquarters, United States Third Army in Koblenz, Germany, and was attached to Headquarters, 10th French Army, at Mainz, until June 1, 1919.

== Interwar period ==
Richardson returned to the United States on 6 July 1919 to join the Morale Division, War Plans Division, of the War Department General Staff in Washington, D.C. In March 1920, Richardson returned to his permanent regular grade of captain. On 9 August 1920, Richardson joined the Office of the Chief of Cavalry, serving until 28 January 1921, when he departed for his third Philippine tour of duty.

In the Philippines, soon to be Major Richardson served as Assistant to the Assistant Chief of Staff for Operations, Headquarters, Philippine Department, in Manila until 6 April 1923, when he returned to the United States to attend the Command and General Staff School at Fort Leavenworth, Kansas. Upon graduation in June 1924, Major Richardson sailed for France to attend the Ecole Superieure de Guerre in Paris, and upon graduation on 2 September 1926, he was ordered to Rome, Italy, to serve as a military attaché. In March 1928, newly promoted Lieutenant Colonel Richardson returned to the United States to join the 13th Cavalry at Fort Riley, Kansas.

On 20 August 1928, he was again assigned to West Point as Commanding Officer, Provisional Battalion and Executive Officer until 2 March 1929, when he became Commandant of Cadets and Head of the Department of Tactics. On 30 June 1933, he began attending the Army War College in Washington, D.C., and upon graduation, he served in the Military Intelligence Division of the War Department General Staff until 7 December 1935. Soon to be promoted to colonel, he was given command of the 5th Cavalry Regiment at Fort Clark. In June 1938, Colonel Richardson assumed command of the 1st Cavalry Division's 2nd Cavalry Brigade at Fort Bliss, Texas. On 10 October 1940, now a temporary major general, he assumed command of the division. On 11 February 1941, he became the War Department's Director of Public Relations.

== World War II ==
In August 1941, he became commander of the VII Corps, which had its headquarters at Birmingham, Alabama. The corps later participated in the Louisiana Maneuvers. After the Japanese Attack on Pearl Harbor, he moved his corps to California and oversaw the buildup of defenses on the Pacific coast. Several months after Pearl Harbor, General George C. Marshall, the Chief of Staff of the Army, sent him on a personal reconnaissance of the whole Pacific theater to assess the extent of the Allied situation. While in Australia, General Douglas MacArthur requested of General Marshall that General Richardson return to command an Army corps being stood up in Australia. Upon his return to Washington, General Richardson frankly reported to General Marshall the inappropriateness of US forces being placed under the command of foreign officers. This was based on his World War I experience from General John J. Pershing insisting that US forces fight under US command. This led to the unconfirmed rumor that Richardson's report cost him the corps command under MacArthur.

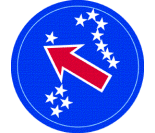
U.S. Army Pacific

In June 1943, he was promoted to temporary lieutenant general and assigned as commanding general of the Hawaiian Department, Military Governor of Hawaii, and of all Army personnel in the Pacific Ocean Areas and Mid-Pacific. By mid-1944 he had become commander of U.S. Army Forces, Central Pacific Area. As the administrative commander, he oversaw the Army’s planning, logistical preparation, training, and force deployment efforts as part of the overall U.S. joint forces island hopping campaign that led to the surrender of Japan. His Army ground and air forces fought in all the major central and mid-Pacific battles while under the operational command of United States Navy Admiral Nimitz.

During his Hawaiian command, General Richardson built up an extensive training operation on the Hawaiian Islands to train military personnel in amphibious operations, jungle fighting, and other command and support operations. He oversaw the construction of Fort Shafter's headquarters buildings in a scant 49 days; the "Pineapple Pentagon" has remained the planning and operational support centers for soldiers of the U.S. Army, Pacific since 1944, and was memorialized for General Richardson after his death.

General Walter Short, in collaboration with the territorial governor of Hawaii, proclaimed martial law in Hawaii on 7 December 1941. The Army commanders who succeeded Short maintained martial law, along with suspending the right of habeas corpus. In late 1943, a test case challenging this suspension was brought to court. Federal Judge Delbert Metzger ordered the military governor to allow two German Americans then being held in military custody to appear in court. When Richardson refused to comply, Metzger charged him with contempt and issued a $5,000 fine. He was later pardoned by President Roosevelt.

During this period another controversy arose. In June 1944, General Richardson disputed Marine Lieutenant General Holland Smith's removal of Army Major General Ralph C. Smith from command of the 27th Infantry Division during the Battle of Saipan. General Richardson, as the administrative commander of all Pacific Army personnel, questioned both whether Marine General Smith, as the operational commander, had the authority to relieve Army General Smith, and whether the relief was justified by the facts. This minor inter-service controversy was fanned by the media into controversy over the Pacific war strategy as a whole, and led to a bitter inter-service relationship in the Pacific Theater. At its core, this was a difference of opinion between the U.S. Navy and Marine Corps and the U.S. Army over command authority, pre-campaign planning, and operational tactics. Also fueling the controversy was General Holland Smith's low opinion and poor treatment of the Army personnel under his control.

In October 1944, Richardson was made a permanent major general. He stood in the front row of the senior leaders who witnessed Japan’s formal surrender on the deck of the USS Missouri on 2 September 1945. After the war, Richardson continued to command the Hawaiian Department and U.S. Army Forces in the Middle Pacific until October 1946, when he reached the mandatory retirement age of 64.

== Retirement ==
Richardson was predeceased by his wife, Lois, who died on 26 July 1951 at the age of 66 at the couple's home in Bath. During his retirement, Richardson traveled and spent time in New York during the winter months. Richardson was writing his memoirs before his passing, but the manuscript was never completed. General Richardson died on 2 March 1954 of a heart attack while on vacation in Italy, and was posthumously promoted to full general on 19 July 1954 by special act of the United States Congress, Public Law 83-508.

== Orders, decorations and medals ==
Army Distinguished Service Medal
Navy Distinguished Service Medal
Silver Star
Legion of Merit
Purple Heart
Philippine Campaign Medal
World War I Victory Medal with three campaign stars
Army of Occupation of Germany Medal
American Defense Service Medal
American Campaign Medal
Asiatic-Pacific Campaign Medal
World War II Victory Medal
Legion of Honor, Officer (France)
Order of Leopold, Officer (Belgium)
Order of S. Maurice and St. Lazarus, Officer (Italy)
Croix de Guerre with Palm (France)
Medal of Solidarity, 1918, second Class (Panama)

== Dates of rank ==
No insignia	Cadet, United States Military Academy: 19 June 1900
No pin insignia in 1904	Second Lieutenant, United States Army: 15 June 1904
	First Lieutenant, United States Army: 11 March 1911
	Captain, United States Army: 1 July 1916
	Major, Temporary: 7 August 1917
	Lieutenant Colonel, Temporary: 26 August 1918
	Colonel, Temporary: 2 November 1918
	Captain, Regular Army: 15 March 1920
	Major, Regular Army: 1 July 1920
	Lieutenant Colonel, Regular Army: 20 March 1928
	Colonel, Regular Army: 1 July 1935
	Brigadier General, Regular Army: 1 June 1938
	Major General, Army of the United States: 1 October 1940
	Lieutenant General, Army of the United States: 1 June 1943 (Later appointed Lieutenant General in the Regular Army with same date of rank)
	Major General, Regular Army: 1 October 1944
	Lieutenant General, Retired List: 1 November 1946
	General, Posthumous: 19 July 1954
