= Yoholo Micco =

19th-century Muscogee leader

- Yvholv Mēkko (Creek)
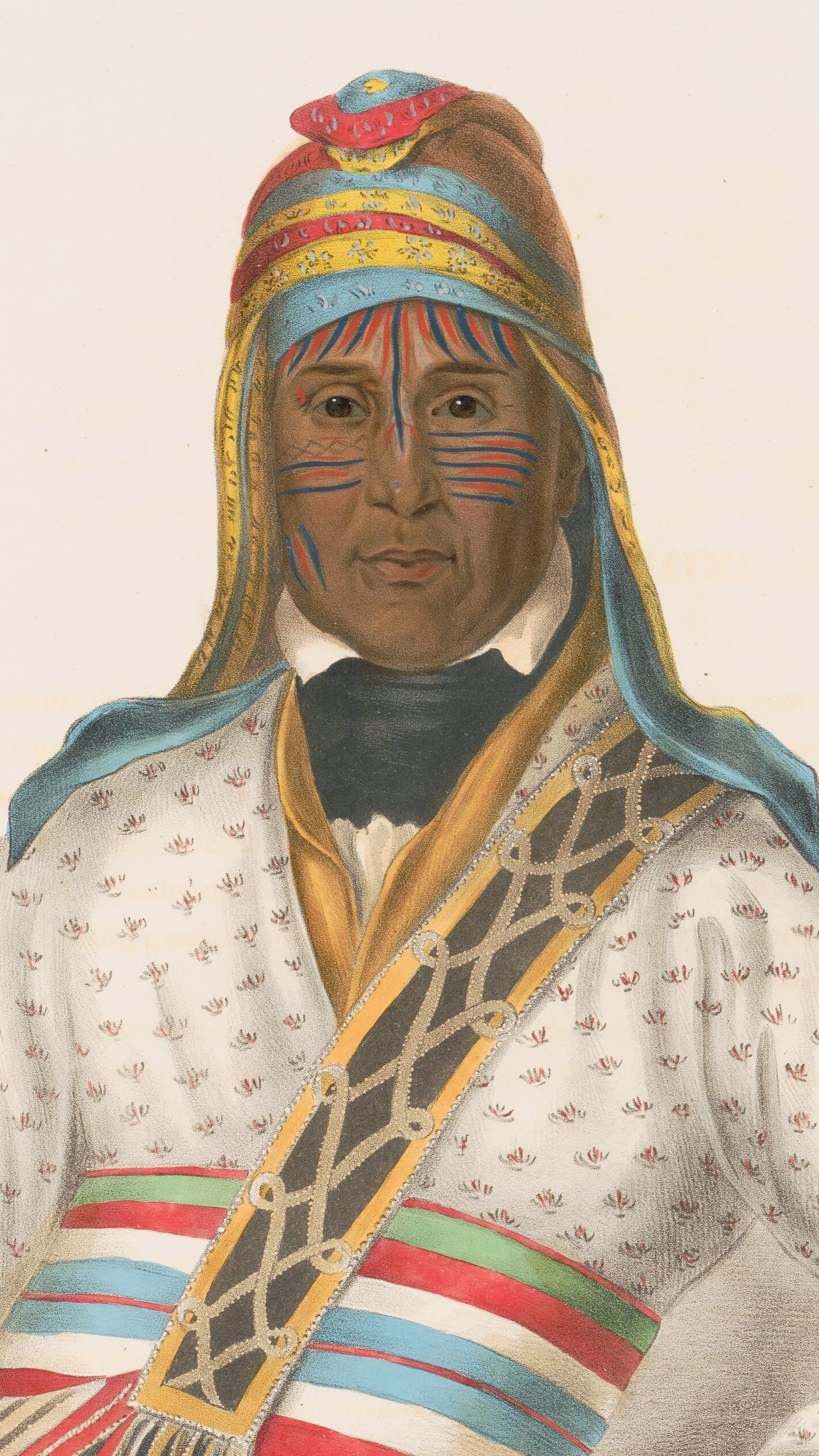
- Born: c. 1778
- Died: After September 1836, before 1838; Probably died during Creek Removal, possibly in present-day Arkansas
- Other names: Chief Eufaula; "Yoholo-Micco, a Creek Chief"; Yaholo Micco

Yoholo Micco (Creek: Yvholv Mēkko; c. 1778–c. 1838) also known as Chief Eufala, was a leader of the Eufaula, a tribe of the Creek Confederacy (Muscogee, Mvskokvlke), who lived on the bluffs of the Chattahoochee River on the border of present-day Alabama and Georgia in southeastern North America. He represented his people in several Indian treaty negotiations with the U.S. government in the 1810s and 1820s. He died during the deportation of Creek people to the west.

== Early life ==
Yoholo-Micco was born about 1788, but "nothing has been recorded as to his parents, his early life, nor when he became chief of Yufala and Speaker of the Creek Nation." Yoholo-Micco is more properly a title than a given or family name; it roughly means leader from an elite family, or prince, or hereditary chieftain, etc. Considered an eloquent speaker, "He was the speaker of the Creek nation, as Opothle Yoholo was of the division called the Upper towns." He was affiliated with the Upper Creeks, distinct from the Lower Creeks or the Muscogee who lived in the vicinity of the Tensaw River.

== Redsticks War ==
During the Redsticks War in Southeastern North America, subsidiary to the larger War of 1812, Yoholo-Micco was allied with William McIntosh (the so-called "friendly Creeks"), and the U.S. government, opposing the Red Sticks party. Come the end of the war, the Muskogee hunting grounds "still covered nearly all of present-day Alabama, stretched across roughly half of Georgia, and reached down into north-central Florida." The post-war treaty imposed on what Andrew Jackson considered a conquered people (erstwhile wartime allies and enemies alike) is considered by recent historians to be a case of dishonorable, opportunistic land-grabbing. Along with other "wealthy Creeks," including McIntosh and Tuskeeheneehau, he petitioned James Monroe in January 1817 for compensation for property losses incurred during the war, which were partially granted.

== Diplomacy ==
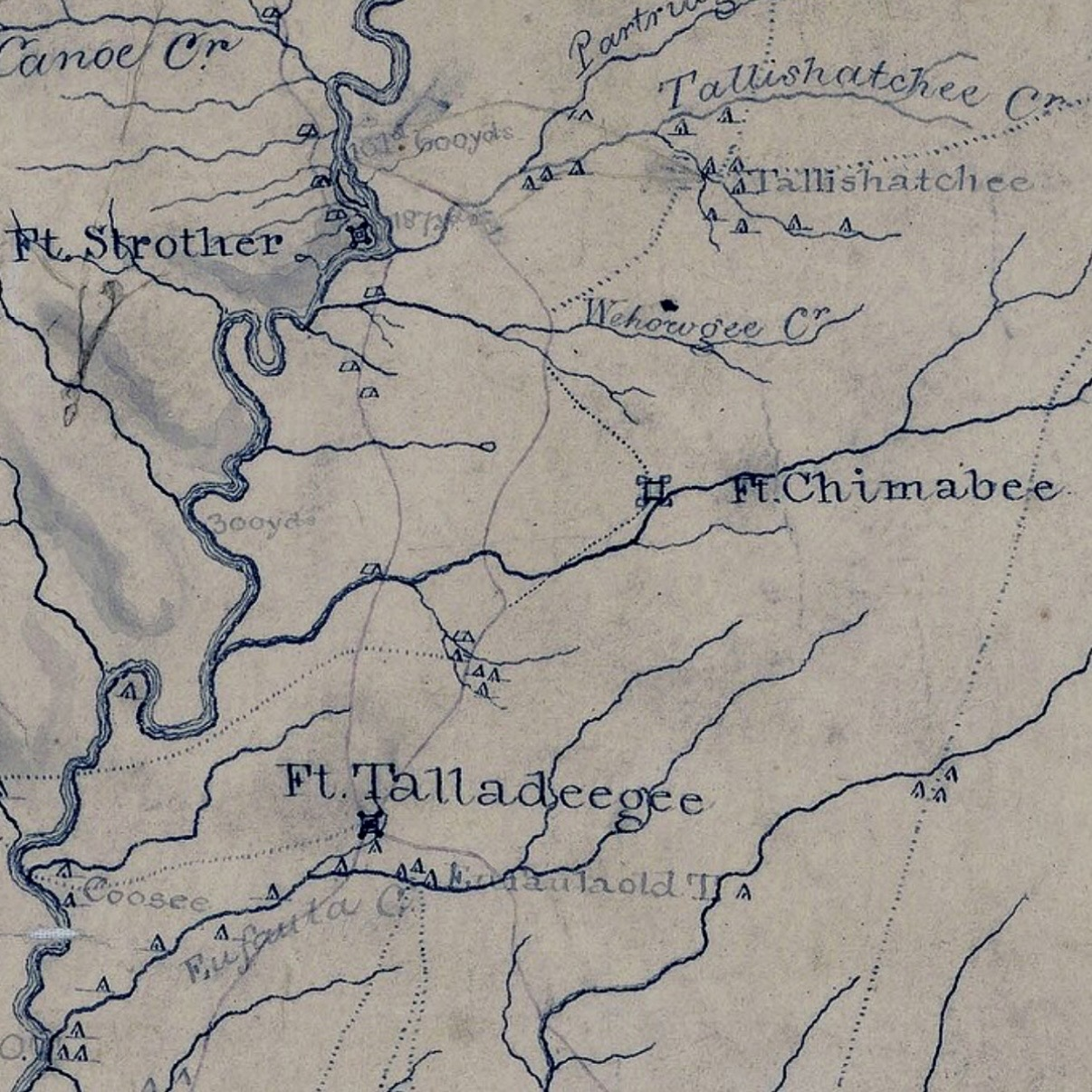
Eufaula Creek, Eufaula Old Town, and "Fort Chimabee" as mapped on "General Jackson's campaign against the Creek Indians 1813 & 1814"

He was a signatory to the 1818 Treaty of the Creek Agency (7 Stat. 171). He was in Washington City with other Creek emissaries including Mad Wolf and Opothleyahola in November 1825. He was a signatory to the 1826 Treaty of Washington (7 Stat. 286). His portrait may have been painted by Charles Bird King at this time; the resulting image "exudes confidence." His portrait is lithographic plate 3 in volume 9 (P27744) of McKenney and Hall's History of the Indian Tribes of North America.

He was part of the Muscogee councils for the Treaty of the Creek Agency (7 Stat. 307) of November 15, 1827, by which the Muscogee ceded the last of their lands in Georgia. At these and other meetings, "He advocated warmly the principles and practices of civilised life, and took so decided a part in favour of the plans to improve the condition of his people, proposed by the American government, and by individuals, that he became unpopular, and lost his place and influence in the general council, and the chieftaincy of his tribe. His successor as principal chief of the Eufalo town is Octearche Micco."

Following the 1832 Treaty of Washington (7 Stat. 366) that established the framework for Creek Removal, the nation was inundated with predatory land speculators and fraudsters. On August 27, 1835, Yoholo-Micco wrote to president Jackson, with whom he "pleaded...for justice" noting "'our privileges as a nation in this country forever lost and we as a people in great trouble. Our country is now full of bad white men. Our property we dare not call our own. The land we had given us by the last treaty though unwilling to sell it ourselves, is often stolen from us by bad white men and bad indians while we are at home with our little families. And before we know it our homes are taken from us and we [are] left to suffer.'"

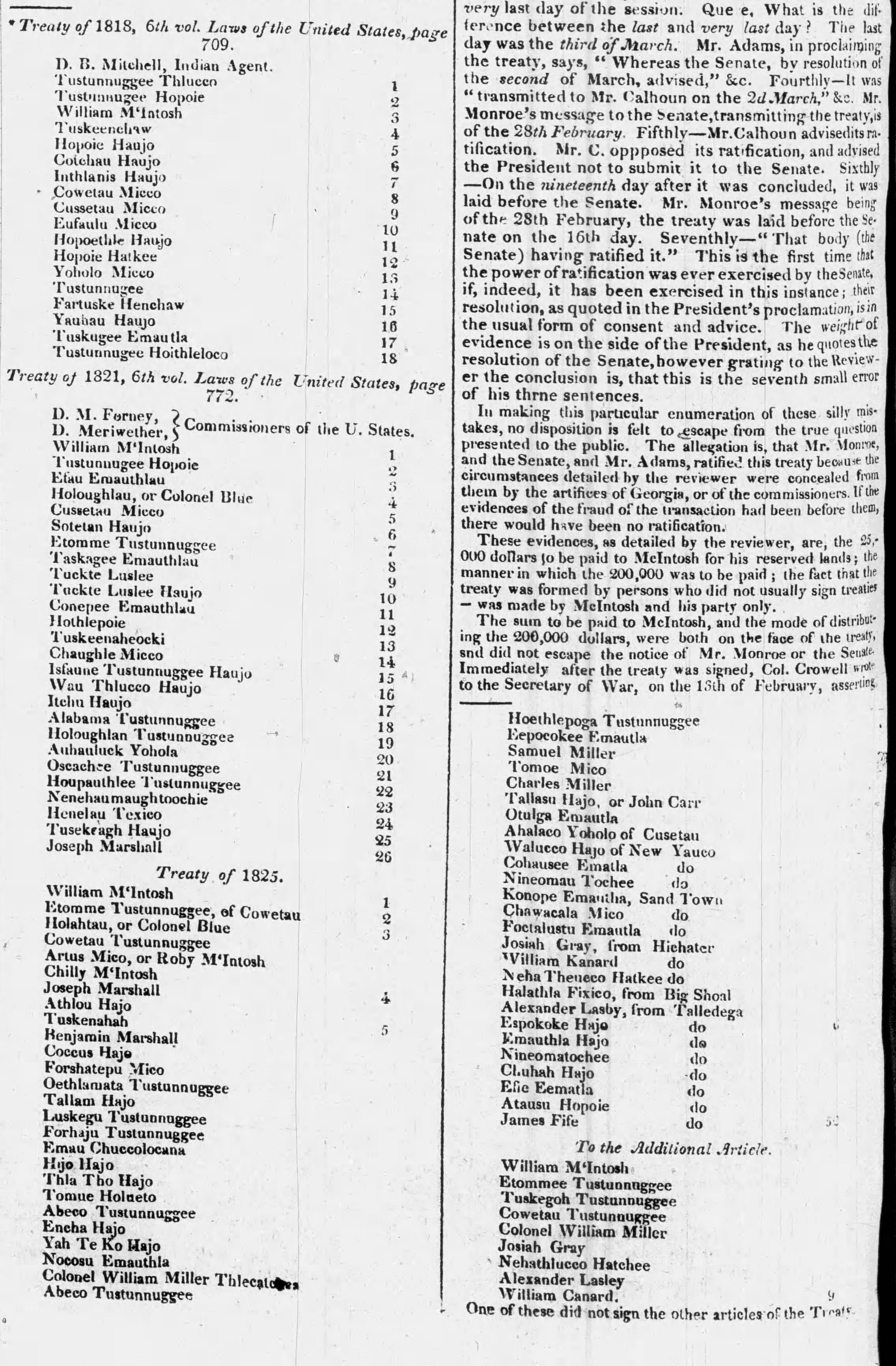
Muscogee Creek signatories to various treaties with the United States (Daily National Intelligencer, 1825)

Yoholo-Micco is said to have made a speech to the Alabama Legislature in the then-state capital of Tuscaloosa in 1836, before expulsion and removal of the Creeks, but while "Yoholo-Micco's actual words are unknown...the colonial writers of history have painted the Creek leader as one who accepted Indigenous removal with an air of romantic resignation, going so far as to contrive his final words to whitewash the genocide that had taken place over three-hundred-plus years. Yoholo-Micco's apocryphal address—which has been reproduced in Alabama history books and grade school curriculum for decades—reads, in part: 'I come here, brothers, to see the great house of Alabama and the men who make laws and say farewell in brotherly kindness before I go to the far west, where my people are now going. In time gone by I have thought that the white men wanted to bring burden and ache of heart among my people in driving them from their homes and yoking them with laws they do not understand. But I have now become satisfied that they are not unfriendly toward us, but that they wish us well.'"

== Removal and later life ==
After the wars and the negotiations were over, wrote an Indian agent in 1838, he "consented to remove to Arkansas, and fell a victim to the fatigues attending the emigration, in his fiftieth year, while on his way to the land of promise." According to Alabama historian Thomas M. Owen, Yoholo-Micco died in 1838, which is the same year the Indian Tribes of America biography about him was published.

Yoholo-Micco probably migrated with the "Fifth Voluntary Emigrating Party," or "fifth detachment" of Muscogee, who traveled to the west in 1836. He was still alive in September 1836 when he was mentioned in a letter to Thomas S. Jesup. The Muscogee who survived expulsion, having crossed through what is now the U.S. state of Arkansas, arrived at Fort Gibson in the Indian Territory between November 1836 and January 1837.

== Family ==
He was a nephew of Ote Emathla (Jumper), "a former Red Stick who escaped to Florida in 1814 and had become an important Seminole headman" and thus a cousin of John Jumper. He had sons and a daughter called Lotti Yoholo, who "married a chief of the Eufalo town, and, following the example of her father, gave her children liberal educations." His son Mistippee is plate 4 in the folio 9 of History of the Indian Tribes of North America, immediately following the profile and portrait of his father.
