= Eolo =

Eolo may refer to:

- Eolo, Bandundu Province, a town on the Kasai River, Democratic Republic of the Congo
- Eolo (car), the first compressed air car
- John Stedham, also known as Eolo, chief of the Muscogee Native American tribe
- Eolo, an Italian telecommunications company
