= Mistippee =

19th-century Muscogee person

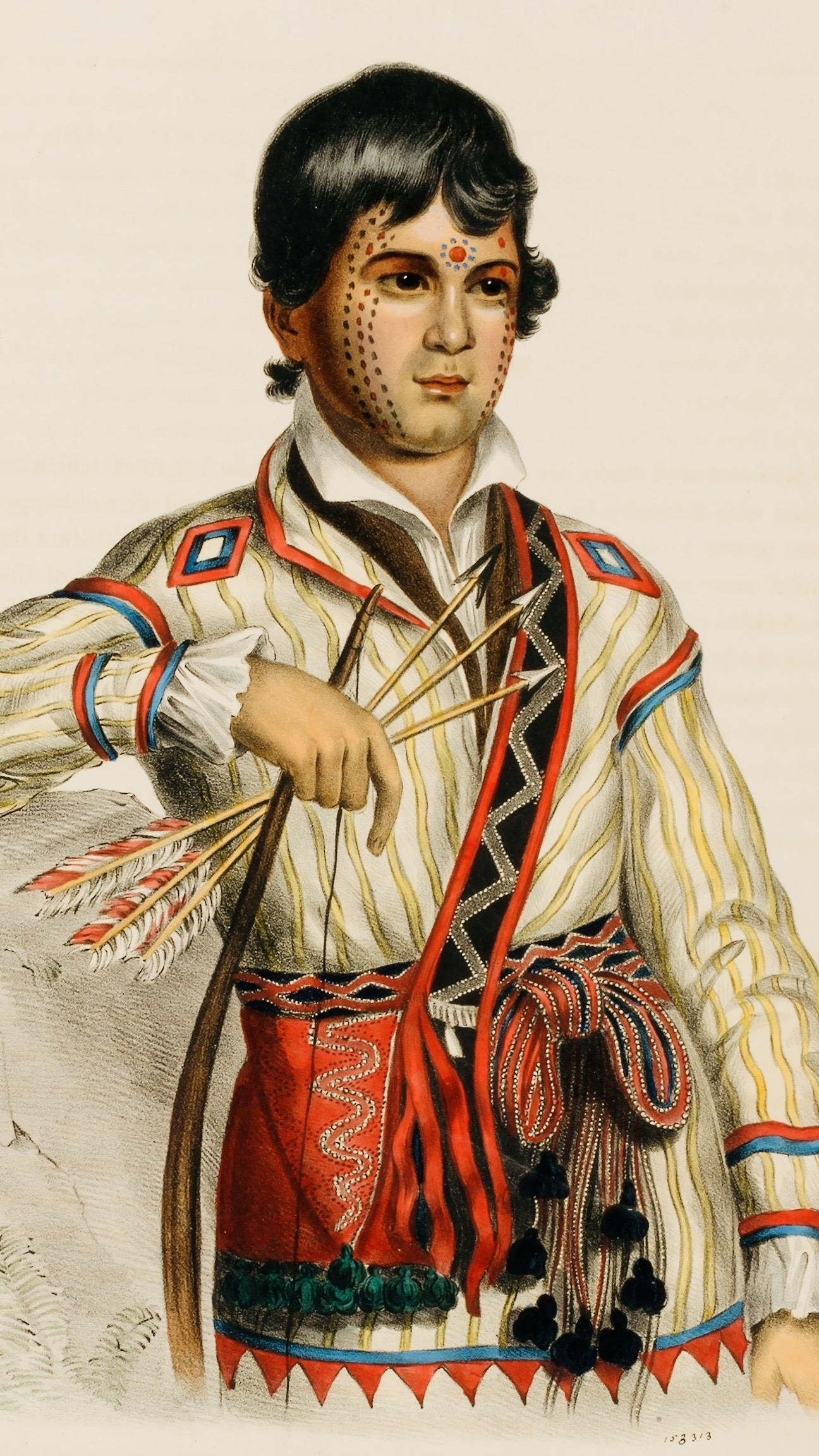
- Other name: Benjamin

Mistippee was Muscogee man from Eufaula tribal town.

== Early life ==
His father was the chief of the Eufaula people within the Muscogee Confederacy, Yoholo Micco. He was named Benjamin at birth, after the Indian agent Benjamin Hawkins. Benjamin became Ben or Benny, and then Mister Ben, and then Mistippee.

== Portrait ==
His portrait is plate 4 in folio 9 (P27745) of History of the Indian Tribes of North America, immediately following the profile and portrait of his father. He was painted in Washington in 1826. He brought with him a blowgun that intrigued the amateur ethnographers of the day.

== Personal life ==
According to Thomas McKenney and James Hall, the credited authors of History of the Indian Tribes of North America, he had "unusual advantages in regard to education, which he is supposed to have improved. When at maturity he wedded a comely woman of the Hillabee towns, and soon after emigrated to the new home provided for his people, west of the Mississippi." Mistipee probably migrated to the Indian Territory with Detachment 5, which traveled to the west in 1836.

== Sources ==
- The Indian Tribes of North America No. 9. Philadelphia: F. W. Greenough. 1838. NMAI.AC.115_ref9 – via Smithsonian Institution.
- Haveman, Christopher D., ed. (2018). Bending their way onward: Creek Indian removal in documents. Lincoln: University of Nebraska Press. doi:10.2307/j.ctt1zk0n24. ISBN 978-0-8032-9698-5. JSTOR j.ctt1zk0n24. LCCN 2017036836. OCLC 1018379931. Project MUSE book 57372.
- Menyuk, Rachel (2022). "McKenney and Hall's History of the Indian Tribes of North America folios and lithographs (NMAI.AC.115)" (PDF). National Museum of the American Indian.
