= Treaty of Cusseta =

1832 treaty between the United States and Creek

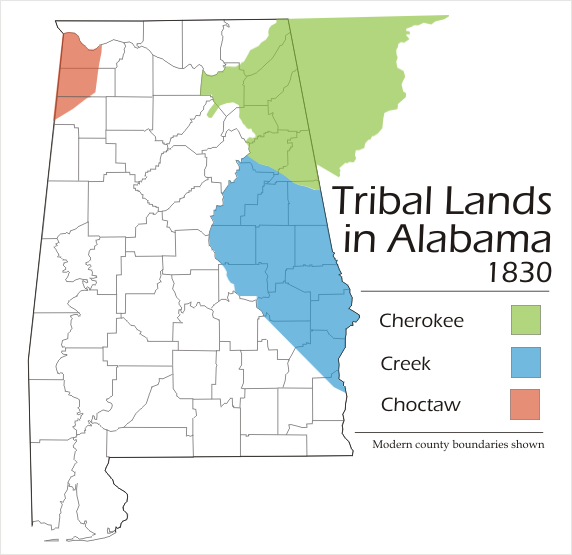
Creek land ceded by the Treaty of Cusseta is shaded in blue.

The Treaty of Cusseta was a treaty between the government of the United States and the Creek Nation signed March 24, 1832 (7 Stat. 366). The treaty ceded all Creek claims east of the Mississippi River to the United States.

== Origins ==
The Treaty of Cusseta, also known as the Third Treaty of Washington, was one of several with the "Five Civilized Tribes." Between 1814 and 1830, the Creek had gradually ceded lands under pressure from European-American settlers and the US government through treaties such as the Treaty of Fort Jackson and the Treaty of Washington (1826). Creek territory was constrained to a strip in east central Alabama along the Georgia border. President Andrew Jackson had signed the Indian Removal Act in 1830, which ultimately led to the deportation of native peoples in the Southeastern United States to the Indian Territory west of the Mississippi River.

Although treaty stipulations had prohibited white settlement of Creek lands, squatters moving into the territory were common and caused significant friction with the Creek. The settlers encroached on their land and competed for game, destroying hunting territory by clearing land and developing farms. Tensions eventually resulted in a party of Creek warriors attacking and burning the town of Roanoke, Georgia.

In response, federal officials met with Creek leaders in the Creek village of Cusseta (Kasihta) on the Chattahoochee River in Georgia. (Lawson Army Airfield in Fort Benning is sited on the former location of Cusseta.) The Creeks were compelled to agree to federal terms as outlined in the Treaty of Cusseta. The treaty was later signed in Washington, D.C.

== Terms ==
The Treaty of Cusseta required that the Creek nation relinquish all claims to land east of the Mississippi River, including the territory in Alabama. In return, individual Creeks were to be granted land claims in the former Creek territory. Each of the ninety Creek chiefs was to receive one section (1 mi^{2}, 2.6 km^{2}) of land and each Creek family was to receive one half-section (0.5 mi^{2}, 1.3 km^{2}) of land of their choosing. Despite the land grants, the treaty made clear the intention of the US government to remove as many Creeks as possible to the west in the least amount of time. The United States agreed to pay expenses for Creek emigrants for the first year after relocation. The treaty also called for the US to make payments to the Creek nation of approximately $350,000 and provide 20 square miles (51 km^{2}) of land to be sold to support Creek orphans.

== Aftermath ==
Once the treaty went into effect, many of the new Creek landowners were quickly taken advantage of by settlers who often purchased the treaty-promised land for a pittance. Those Creeks who managed to keep legal title to their lands were soon overwhelmed by squatters, whom state and federal officials generally refused to evict. When individual Creek attempted to enforce their property rights against squatters, they were often retaliated against by the local militia. By 1835, the situation became intractable and open conflict broke out between Creeks and settlers. The US government responded to violations of the treaty by deporting most of the remaining Creek to the Indian Territory.

== See also ==
- Treaty of Fort Jackson
- Treaty of Washington (1826)
- Treaty of Dancing Rabbit Creek
- Treaty of New Echota
- Treaty of Pontotoc Creek
