= Fushatchee =

Muscogee tribal town

Fushatchee was a band of Muscogee Native Americans. They were located in Alabama and Florida in the United States.

The Fushatchee may have come out of three different Muscogee tribes: Kanhatki, Kolomi, and the Atasi. Europeans first recorded them in 1733. Traders tracked them as being in the same location until 1797. Some traders called them the "Coosahatchies of Swan." Indian agent Benjamin Hawkins wrote that the Fushatchee's village was on flat land on the south side of the Tallapoosa River. The tribe cultivated corn on each side of the river, and dug a moat for fortification. Additional, older settlements were found down the river.

After the Red Stick War, the Fushatchee relocated to northern Florida. They disappeared in census data after 1832. French censuses suggest the tribe merged with the Kanhatki.

After the Seminole Wars, the US federal government forcefully relocated them and the Seminole people further west, and eventually into Indian Territory. The tribe would be represented by the Seminole.

The Fushatchee tribal town in the Alabama and Florida and their ceremonial ground in Oklahoma is called Liwahali.
