= John Stedham =

Creek leader

John Steadham
- Eolo, Hopaychutke
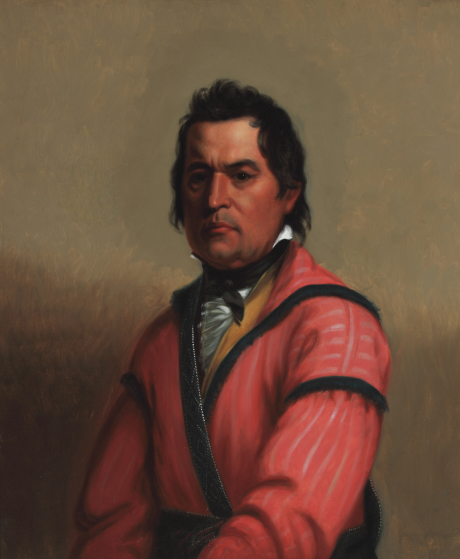
- Eolo painted by Henry Inman, ca. 1831–1834

Personal details
- Born: ca. 1768 Union County, South Carolina
- Died: 20 August 1851 Creek Nation (Alabama)
- Spouse: Delilah Hardage
- Parent(s): Benjamin Stidham and Priscilla (Creek Indian woman)
- Nickname: Col. John Stidham

Eolo, aka John Stedham, was a chief of the Muscogee Native American tribe. His father was a white trader, Benjamin Stidham. In 1810, he lived in Edgefield, South Carolina.

Col. John [310] Stidham or Eola was second in command of the Lower Creeks. He was Headman or Chief of his village, Sowokeelan Town (in present-day Barber Co., Alabama), probably the hometown of his wife. Apparently Government agents gave his title, "Colonel," to him. These agents, ignorant about or insensitive to Native American political structures, would rank the chiefs in military order ... Eola, being second in command of the Lower Creeks, was called Colonel. On 12 Feb 1825, Chief William McIntosh, Head Chief of the Lower Creeks, signed a treaty to sell Creek ancestral lands without authorization of the Creek tribe. This became known as the Treaty of Indian Springs, Georgia. Eola and McIntosh were good friends, but Eola and most of the other chiefs refused to support McIntosh in signing the treaty. That proved to be a wise decision, for McIntosh was subsequently executed for the unauthorized act.
