= Eolo (car) =

Eolo is the first compressed air-powered car. It was invented by Guy Nègre. Motor Development International (MDI) licensed the patent. It was unveiled during the 2001 Bologna Motor Show car and bike fair. An attempt to put it into production failed in 2003. The engine was sold as a power generator with zero emissions.

== How it works ==
The Compressed Air Engine (CAE) utilizes air expansion as an energy source by releasing compressed air from tanks with an extremely cold internal temperature and high pressure, about 300 atm (30,000 kPa). The resulting air expansion is used to move a piston or turbine and turn the crankshaft.

The Eolo car would use electricity and the air around the car to re-fill the compressed air tanks, which could take up to two hours.

== Features ==
It was claimed to be a zero-emissions vehicle. If the energy used to recharge is produced via renewable resources such as wind, geothermal power or solar power, emissions are zero.

== Problems ==
Production should have begun in 2003 in Broni (Italy). For unspecified reasons, MDI was unable to build it. The 90 employees, who were supposed to begin production, were from 2003 to 2005 under the "cassa integrazione" law, an Italian law which provides, through state benefits, payroll to employees who, for special reasons due to the employers, are unable to perform their jobs. They were then terminated.

However, it is likely that the air decompression, and the consequent drop in temperature, causes the natural humidity to condense as ice in the engine, eventually stopping it.

== See also ==
- Air car
- Air engine
- Cyril Guy Nègre
