= Eufaula people =

American Indian tribe of the Muscogee Creek Confederacy

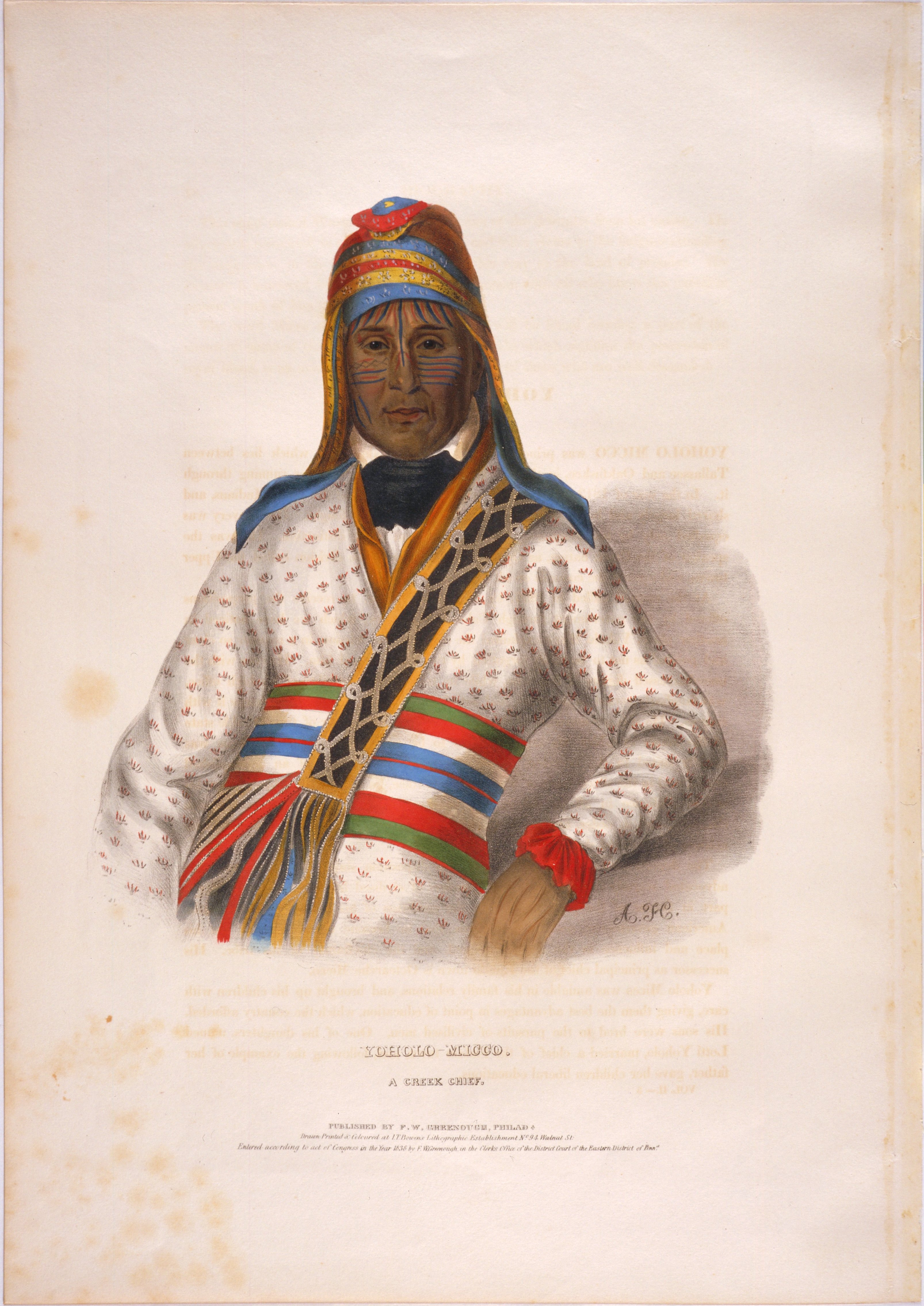
Chief Eufaula, also known as Yoholo-Micco, the leader of the Eufaula in Eufaula, Alabama

The Eufaula people (Creek: Yofalv) were a tribe of Native Americans in the United States, located in the Southeast. A Muskogean-speaking people, they possibly broke off from the Kealedji or Hilibi tribe. They were part of the Muscogee Creek Confederacy.

Some Eufaula lived along the Chattahoochee River in what later became the state of Georgia. The Lower Creek Eufaula settled there by 1733, and quite possibly earlier than that. With more frequent contact with Europeans and later Americans, they had trade and adopted some European-style customs.

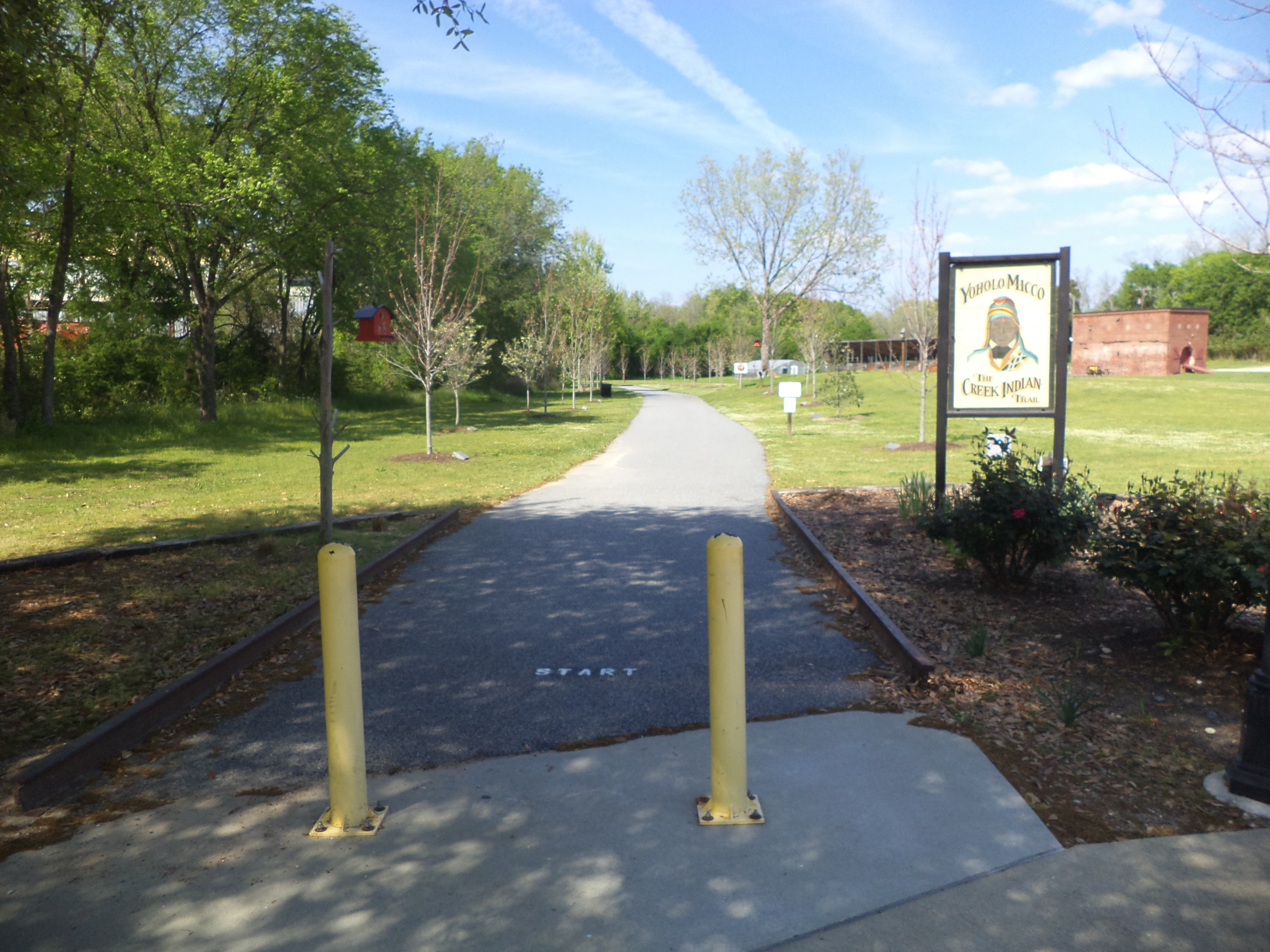
The Creek Indian trailhead in Eufaula, named after Yoholo-Micco

In 1832, theirs was the only Upper Creek town listed on the census. In 1825, their chief, Yoholo Micco, traveled to Washington, D.C. in an attempt to renegotiate the Treaty of Indian Springs (1821). They were unsuccessful, and the very disadvantageous Treaty of Indian Springs (1825) was enacted, which forced them to move across the river in Eufaula, Alabama, where a bike trail commemorates their story.

In 1836, they were forced further west again, during the Trail of Tears. Their people were one of the Upper Creek towns that moved to Indian Territory; they settled near what developed as Eufaula, Oklahoma, named for them and their towns.

== Namesakes ==
Their name is preserved in the modern cities of Eufaula, Alabama and Eufaula, Oklahoma; and also with lakes, specifically Lake Eufaula in Oklahoma and Lake Eufaula in Alabama.

== Notes ==
- Biography of Yoholo-Micco and his son in Indians of North America, c. 1844
