= Muscogee =

Indigenous people from Southeastern Woodlands

Este Mvskokvlke (Creek)
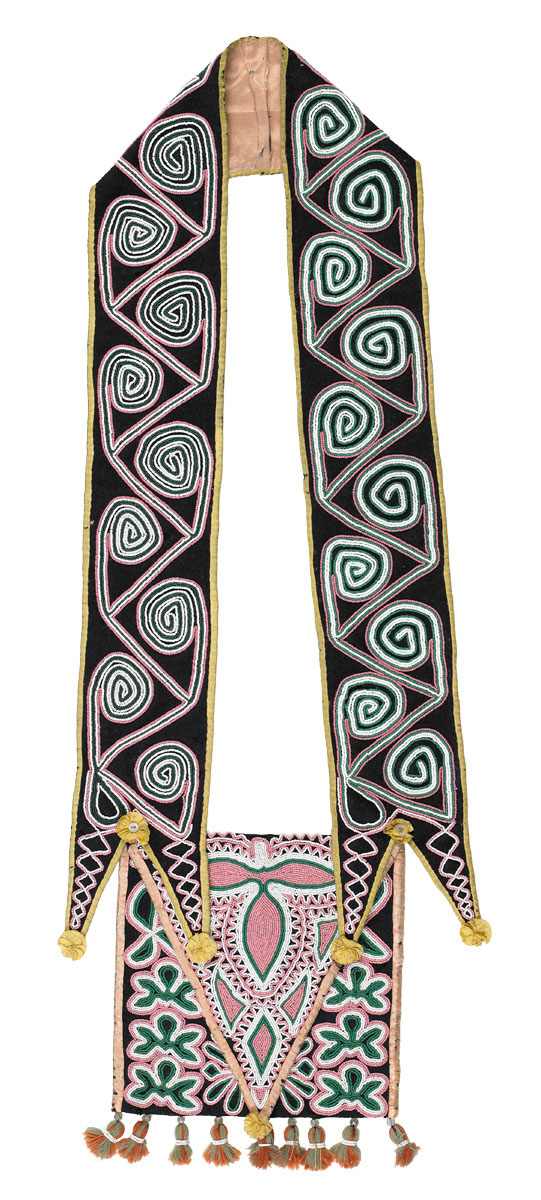
- Muscogee Creek bandolier bag, c. 1820, Birmingham Museum of Art

Total population
- 2010: self-identified 88,332 alone and in combination

Regions with significant populations
- United States (historically Alabama, Georgia, Mississippi, Florida, and Tennessee; now primarily Oklahoma and Alabama)

Languages
- Muscogee, Hitchiti-Mikasuki, and English

Religion
- Protestantism, Four Mothers Society, and others

Related ethnic groups
- Yuchi, Muskogean peoples: Alabama, Koasati, Miccosukee, Yamasee, Chickasaw, Choctaw, Coushatta, Mascogos, Apalachee and Seminoles

The Muscogee (English: /məsˈkoʊɡiː/ məss-KOH-ghee), Mvskoke or Mvskokvlke, (Note: Creek: Este Mvskokvlke pronounced [mə̀skóːɡə̂lɡì]; transl. "Mvskoke people") also known as Muscogee Creek or just Creek, are a group of related Indigenous peoples of the Southeastern Woodlands in the United States. Their historical homelands are in what now comprises southern Tennessee, much of Alabama, western Georgia and parts of northern Florida.

Most of the Muscogee people were forcibly removed to Indian Territory (now Oklahoma) by the federal government in the 1830s during the Trail of Tears. A small group of the Muscogee Creek Confederacy remained in Alabama, and their descendants formed the federally recognized Poarch Band of Creek Indians. Another Muscogee group moved into Florida between roughly 1767 and 1821, trying to evade European encroachment, and intermarried with local tribes to form the Seminole. Through ethnogenesis, the Seminole emerged with a separate identity from the rest of the Muscogee Creek Confederacy. The great majority of Seminole were forcibly relocated to Indian Territory in the late 1830s, where their descendants later formed federally recognized tribes. Some of the Seminole moved south with the Miccosukee into the Everglades, resisting removal. These two tribes gained federal recognition in the 20th century and remain in Florida.

The respective languages of all of these modern-day branches, bands, and tribes, except one, are closely related variants called Muscogee, Mvskoke and Hitchiti-Mikasuki, all of which belong to the Eastern Muskogean branch of the Muscogean language family. These languages are mostly mutually intelligible. The Yuchi people today are part of the Muscogee (Creek) Nation, but their Yuchi language is a linguistic isolate, unrelated to any other language.

The ancestors of the Muscogee people were part of the Mississippian Ideological Interaction Sphere, also known as Mississippian cultures. Between 800 and 1600 CE, they built complex cities with earthwork mounds with surrounding networks of satellite towns and farmsteads. Muscogee confederated town networks were based on a 900-year-old history of complex and well-organized farming and town layouts around plazas, ballparks, and square ceremonial dance grounds.

Creek man

The Muscogee Creek are associated with large moundbuilding polities, such as the Ocmulgee, Etowah Indian Mounds, and Moundville sites. Precontact Muscogee polities shared agriculture, transcontinental trade, craft specialization, hunting, and religion. Early Spanish explorers encountered ancestors of the Muscogee in the mid-16th century.

The Muscogee were the first Native Americans officially considered by the early United States government to be "civilized" under George Washington's civilization plan. In the 19th century, the Muscogee were known as one of the "Five Civilized Tribes", because they were said to have integrated numerous cultural and technological practices of their more recent European American neighbors. The Creek Confederacy included "Hitchiti, Alabama, and Choctaw groups; Tuskegee, Guale, Yamasee, Cusabo, Chatot, Osochi; Muskogee and Natchez branches; Uchean and Timuquanan stock; South Florida Indians; Tamahiti" and other ethnic, linguistic, and social communities.

Influenced by Tenskwatawa's interpretations of the 1811 comet and the New Madrid earthquakes, the Upper Towns of the Muscogee, supported by the Shawnee leader Tecumseh, actively resisted European-American encroachment. Internal divisions with the Lower Towns led to the Red Stick War (Creek War, 1813–1814). Begun as a civil war within Muscogee factions, it enmeshed the Northern Muscogee bands as British allies in the War of 1812 against the United States, while the Southern Muscogee remained US allies. Once the northern Muscogee Creek rebellion had been put down by General Andrew Jackson with the aid of the Southern Muscogee Creek, the Muscogee nation was forced to sign the Treaty of Fort Jackson, which ceded 22,000,000 acres of land to the US, including land belonging to the Southern Muscogee who had fought alongside Jackson. The result was a weakening of the Muscogee Creek Confederacy and the forced cession of Muscogee lands to the US.

During the 1830s Indian Removal, most of the Muscogee Confederacy were forcibly relocated to Indian Territory. The Muscogee (Creek) Nation, Alabama-Quassarte Tribal Town, Kialegee Tribal Town, and Thlopthlocco Tribal Town, all based in Oklahoma, are federally recognized tribes. In addition, the Poarch Band of Creek Indians of Alabama, the Coushatta Tribe of Louisiana, and the Alabama-Coushatta Tribe of Texas are federally recognized. Formed in part originally by Muscogee refugees, the Seminole people today have three federally recognized tribes: the Seminole Nation of Oklahoma, Seminole Tribe of Florida, and Miccosukee Tribe of Indians of Florida.

== History ==
=== Precontact ===
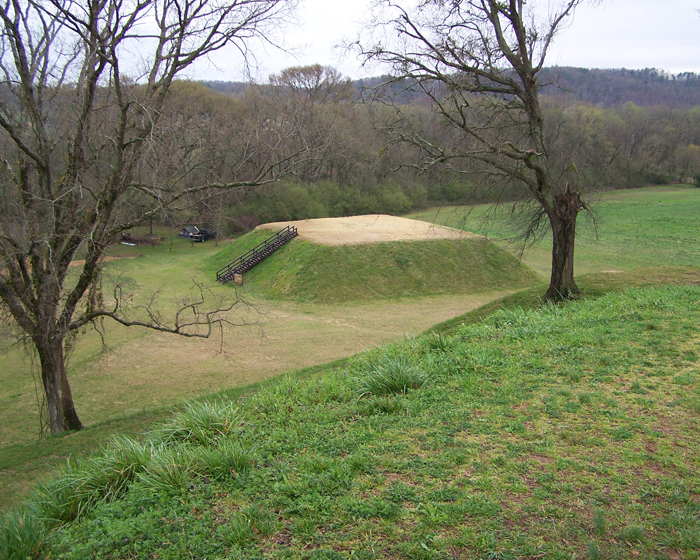
Etowah Mound C, was part of a precontact Mississippian culture site, occupied by ancestors of the Muscogee people from c. 1000–1550 CE, in Cartersville, Georgia

At least 12,000 years ago, Native Americans or Paleo-Indians lived in what is today the Southern United States. Paleo-Indians in the Southeast were hunter-gatherers who pursued a wide range of animals, including megafauna, which became extinct following the end of the Pleistocene age. During the time known as the Woodland period, from 1000 BC to 1000 AD, locals developed pottery and small-scale horticulture of the Eastern Agricultural Complex.

The Mississippian culture arose as the cultivation of corn (maize) from Mesoamerica led to agricultural surpluses and population growth. Increased population density gave rise to urban centers and regional chiefdoms. Stratified societies developed, with hereditary religious and political elites. This culture flourished in what is now the Midwestern, Eastern, and Southeastern United States from 800 to 1500, especially along the Mississippi River and its major tributaries.

The early historic Muscogee were descendants of the Mississippian culture along the Tennessee River in modern Tennessee, Georgia, and Alabama. They may have been related to the Tama of central Georgia. Muscogee oral history describes a migration from places west of the Mississippi River, in which they eventually settled on the east bank of the Ocmulgee River. Here they waged war against other bands of Native American Indians, such as the Savanna, Ogeeche, Wapoo, Santee, Yamasee, Utina, Icofan, Patican and others, until at length they had overcome them, and absorbed some as confederates into their tribe.

In the mid-16th century, when explorers from the Spanish made their first forays inland from the shores of the Gulf of Mexico, many political centers of the Mississippians were already in decline, or abandoned. The region is best described as a collection of moderately sized native chiefdoms (such as the Coosa chiefdom on the Coosa River), interspersed with completely autonomous villages and tribal groups. The earliest Spanish explorers encountered villages and chiefdoms of the late Mississippian culture, beginning on April 2, 1513, with Juan Ponce de León's landing in Florida. The 1526 Lucas Vázquez de Ayllón expedition in South Carolina also recorded encounters with these peoples.

Muscogee people were gradually influenced by interactions and trade with the Europeans: trading or selling deer hides in exchange for European goods such as muskets, or alcohol. Secondly, the Spanish pressed them to identify leaders for negotiations; they did not understand government by consensus.

=== Spanish expedition (1540–1543) ===
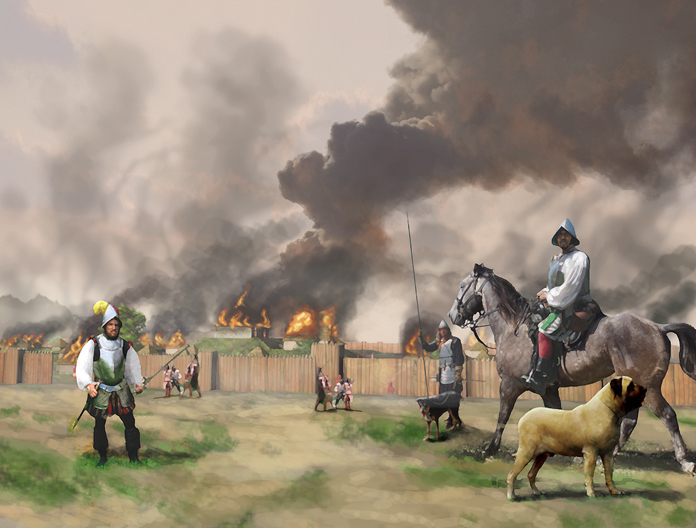
Hernando de Soto and his men burn Mabila, after a surprise attack by Chief Tuskaloosa and his people in 1540. Painting by Herb Roe, 2008

After Cabeza de Vaca, a castaway who survived the ill-fated Narváez expedition, returned to Spain in 1537, he told the Court that Hernando de Soto had said that America was the "richest country in the world". Hernando de Soto was a Spanish explorer and conquistador who led the first expedition into the interior of the North American continent. De Soto, convinced of the "riches", wanted Cabeza de Vaca to go on the expedition, but Cabeza de Vaca declined his offer because of a payment dispute.

From 1540 to 1543, de Soto explored through present-day Florida and Georgia, and then westward into the Alabama and Mississippi area. The areas were inhabited by historic Muscogee Native Americans. De Soto brought with him a well-equipped army. He attracted many recruits from a variety of backgrounds who joined his quest for riches in the Americas.

As the de Soto expedition's brutalities became known to the Indigenous peoples, they decided to defend their territory. Chief Tuskaloosa led his people in the Battle of Mabila, where the Native Americans were defeated. The victory came at great cost to the Spanish campaign in loss of supplies, casualties, and morale. The expedition never fully recovered.

=== Rise of the Muscogee Confederacy ===
Because of endemic infectious diseases carried unknowingly by the Europeans, but new to the Muscogee, the Spanish expedition resulted in epidemics of smallpox and measles, and a high rate of fatalities among the Indigenous peoples. These losses were exacerbated by the Indian slave trade that colonists conducted in the Southeast during the 17th and 18th centuries. As the survivors and descendants regrouped, the Muscogee Creek Confederacy arose as a loose alliance of Muskogee-speaking peoples.

The Muscogee lived in autonomous villages in river valleys throughout present-day Tennessee, Georgia, and Alabama, speaking several related Muskogean languages. Muskogee was spoken from the Chattahoochee to the Alabama River. Koasati (Coushatta) and Alibamu were spoken in the upper Alabama River basin and along parts of the Tennessee River. Hitchiti was spoken in several towns along the Chattahoochee River and across much of present-day Georgia. The Muscogee were a confederacy of tribes consisting of Yuchi, Koasati, Alabama, Coosa, Tuskegee, Coweta, Cusseta, Chehaw (Chiaha), Hitchiti, Tuckabatchee, Oakfuskee, and many others.

The basic social unit was the town (idalwa). Abihka, Coosa, Tuckabutche, and Coweta are the four "mother towns" of the Muscogee Confederacy. Traditionally, the Cusseta and Coweta bands are considered the earliest members of the Muscogee Nation. The Lower Towns (Elecvlke), along the Chattahoochee River (before 1690 and after 1715), and farther east along the Ocmulgee, Oconee, and Savannah River rivers (between 1690 and 1715), were Coweta, Cusseta (Kasihta), Koloni, Tuskegee, Chiaha, Hitchiti, Oconee, Ocmulgee, Apalachicola, and Sawokli.

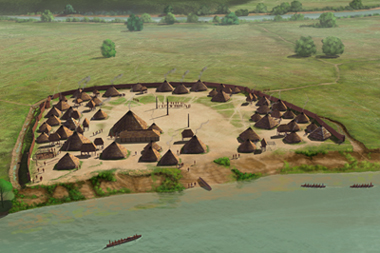
The protohistoric King site, occupied during the mid-1500s

The Upper Towns (Onvpvlke), located on the Coosa, Tallapoosa and Alabama rivers, were Tuckabatchee, Abhika, Coosa (Kusa; the dominant people of East Tennessee and North Georgia during the Spanish explorations), Itawa (original inhabitants of the Etowah Indian Mounds), Hothliwahi (Ullibahali), Hilibi, Eufaula, Wakokai, Atasi, Alibamu, Coushatta (Koasati; they had absorbed the Kaski/Casqui and the Tali), and Tuskegee ("Napochi" in the de Luna chronicles).

The most important leader in Muscogee society was the mēkko (anglicized as Mico) or village chief. Mēkkos led warriors in battle and represented their villages, but held authority only insofar as they could persuade others to agree with their decisions. Mēkkos ruled with the assistance of mēkkvlke or lesser chiefs, and various advisors, including a second-in-charge called the henehv, respected village elders, medicine men, and a tvstvnvke or ranking warrior, the principal military advisor. The heles-hayv or medicine maker officiated at various rituals, including providing black drink, used in purification ceremonies.

The most important social unit was the clan. Clans organized hunts, distributed lands, arranged marriages, and punished lawbreakers. The authority of the mēkkos was complemented by the clan mothers, mostly women elders. The Muscogee had a matrilineal kinship system, with children considered born into their mother's clan, and inheritance was through the maternal line. The Wind Clan is the first of the clans. The majority of mēkkos have belonged to this clan.

=== British, French, and Spanish expansion ===
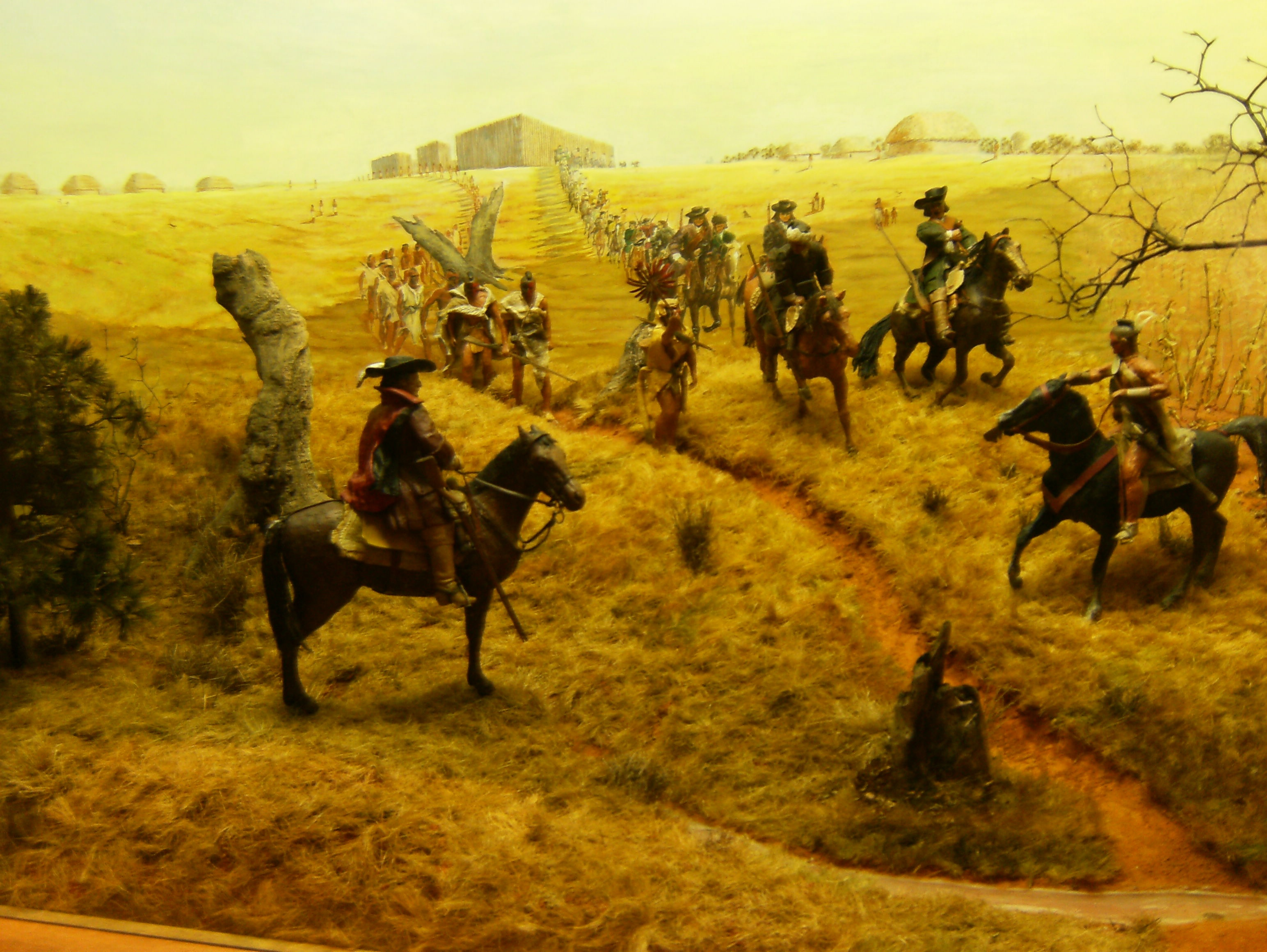
A raiding party against Spanish missions in Florida passes the Ocmulgee trading post

Britain, France, and Spain all established colonies in the present-day Southeastern woodlands. Spain established Jesuit missions and related settlements to influence Native Americans. The British and the French opted for trade over conversion. In the 17th century, Franciscan friars in Spanish Florida built missions along Apalachee Bay. In 1670, English colonists from Barbados founded Charles Town, modern-day Charleston, the capital of the new colony of Carolina. Traders from Carolina went to Muscogee settlements to exchange firearms, gunpowder, axes, glass beads, cloth and West Indian rum for white-tailed deer pelts (as part of the deerskin trade) and Indian slaves.

The Spanish and their "mission Indians" burned most of the towns along the Chattahoochee after they welcomed Scottish explorer Henry Woodward in 1685. In 1690, English colonists built a trading post on the Ocmulgee River, known as Ochese-hatchee (creek), where a dozen towns relocated to escape the Spanish and acquire English goods. The name "Creek" most likely derived from a shortening of Ocheese Creek (the Hitchiti name for the body of water known today as the Ocmulgee River), and broadly applies to all of the Muscogee Confederacy, including the Yuchi and Natchez.

In 1704, Irish colonial administrator James Moore led the Carolina militia and Ochese Creek and Yamasee warriors on a series of raids against Spanish missions in the Florida interior during Queen Anne's War. These raids captured thousands of Spanish-allied Indians, primarily Apalachee, who were sold into slavery in Carolina and the West Indies. A decade later, tensions between colonists and Indians in the region led to the Yamassee War of 1715–17.

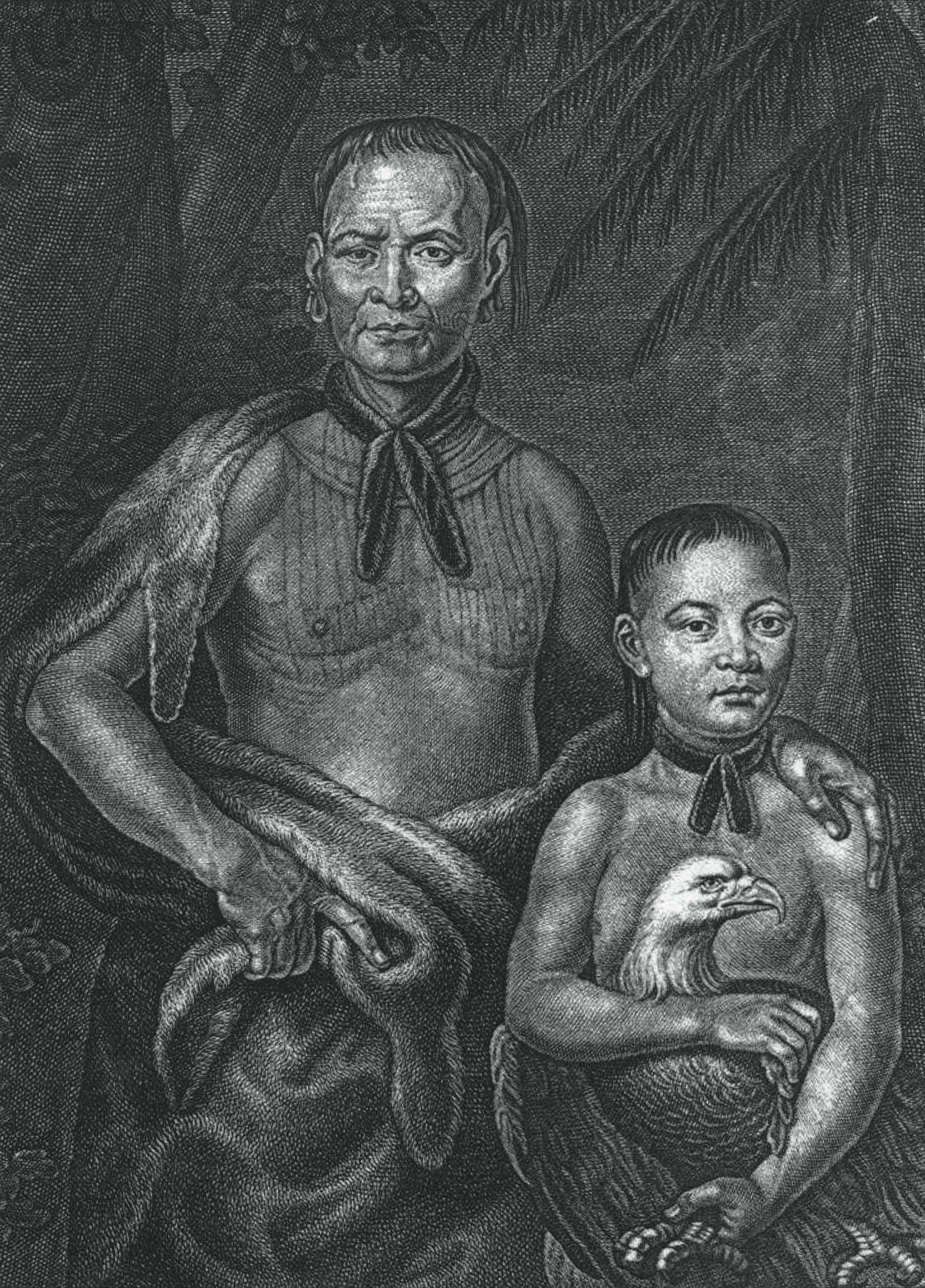
Yamacraw leader Tomochichi and nephew in 1733

The Ochese Creeks joined the Yamasee, burning trading posts, and raiding back-country settlers, but the revolt ran low on gunpowder and was put down by Carolinian militia and their Cherokee allies. The Yamasee took refuge in Spanish Florida, the Ochese Creeks fled west to the Chattahoochee. In 1702, French Canadian explorers founded Mobile as the first capital of Louisiana. In 1717, they took advantage of the war to build Fort Toulouse at the confluence of the Tallapoosa and Coosa, trading with the Alabama and Coushatta. Fearing they would come under French influence, the British reopened the deerskin trade with the Lower Creeks, antagonizing the Yamasee, now allies of Spain.

The French instigated the Upper Creeks to raid the Lower Creeks. In May 1718, the shrewd Emperor Brim, mēkko of the powerful Coweta band, invited representatives of Britain, France, and Spain to his village and, in council with Upper and Lower Creek leaders, declared a policy of Muscogee neutrality in their colonial rivalry. In 1718, the Spaniards built the presidio of San Marcos de Apalache on Apalachee Bay. In 1721, the British built Fort King George at the mouth of the Altamaha River. As the three European colonial powers established themselves along the borders of Muscogee lands, the Muscogee strategy of neutrality allowed them to hold the balance of power.

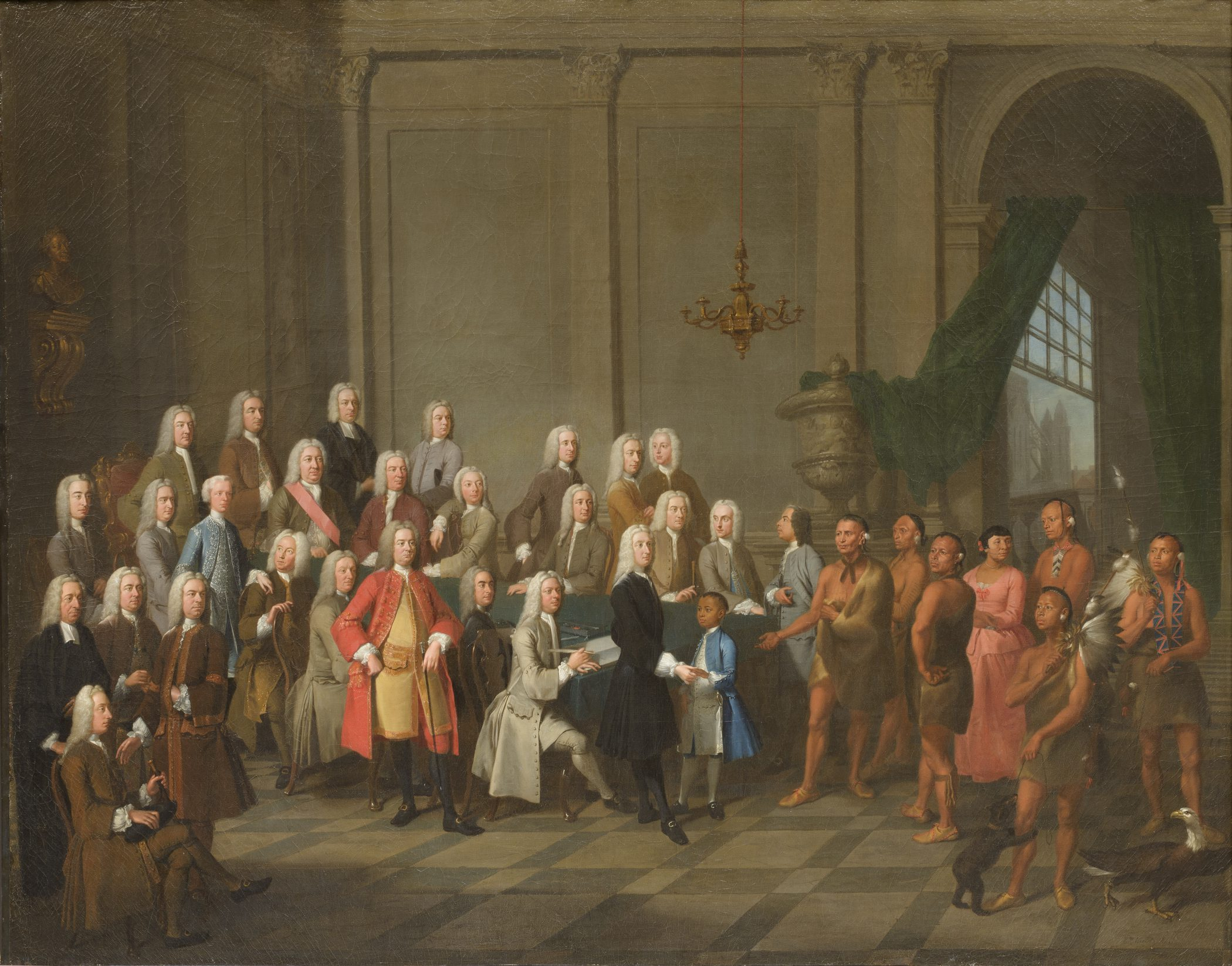
A Yamacraw delegation meeting with the Trustees for the Establishment of the Colony of Georgia in America in 1734

In 1732, the British Province of Georgia was established. In 1733, its first settlement, Savannah, was founded on a river bluff where the Yamacraw, a Yamasee band that remained allies of Britain, allowed John Musgrove to establish a fur-trading post. His wife Mary Musgrove was the daughter of an English trader and a Muscogee woman from the powerful Wind Clan, half-sister of 'Emperor' Brim. She was the principal interpreter for Georgia's founder and first Governor Gen. James Oglethorpe, using her connections to foster peace between the Creek Indians and the new colony. In 1735, Georgia constructed Fort Okfuskee near Oakfuskee to compete with French trade with the Creeks at Fort Toulouse. The deerskin trade grew, and by the 1750s, Savannah exported up to 50,000 deerskins a year.

In 1736, Spanish and British officials established a neutral zone from the Altamaha to the St. Johns River in present-day Florida, guaranteeing Native hunting grounds for the deerskin trade and protecting Spanish Florida from further British encroachment. Ca. 1750 a group of Ochese moved to the neutral zone, after clashing with the Muskogee-speaking towns of the Chattahoochee, where they had fled after the Yamasee War.

Led by Chief Secoffee (Cowkeeper), they became the center of a new tribal confederacy, the Seminole, which grew to include earlier refugees from the Yamasee War, remnants of the 'mission Indians,' and escaped African slaves. Their name comes from the Spanish word cimarrones, which originally referred to a domestic animal that had reverted to the wild. Cimarrones was used by the Spanish and Portuguese to refer to fugitive slaves—"maroon" emerges linguistically from this root as well—and American Indians who fled the Europeans. In the Hitchiti language, which lacked an 'r' sound, it became simanoli, and eventually Seminole.

=== Intermarriage ===
Many Muscogee Creek leaders, due to intermarriage, have British names: Alexander McGillivray, Josiah Francis, William McIntosh, Peter McQueen, William Weatherford, William Perryman, and others. These reflect Muscogee women having children with British colonists. For instance, Indian agent Benjamin Hawkins married a Muscogee woman. In Muscogee culture, unmarried Muscogee women had great freedom over their own sexuality compared to European and European-American counterparts.

Under the customs of Muscogee matrilineal society, their children belonged to their mother's clan. With the exception of McGillivray, mixed-raced Muscogee people worked against Muscogee Creek interests, as they understood them. To the contrary, in many cases, they spearheaded resistance to settler encroachment on Muscogee Creek lands. That they usually spoke English as well as Mvskoke, and knew European customs as well, made them community leaders; they "dominated Muskogee politics". As put by Claudio Saunt:

These offspring of mixed marriages occupied a different position in the economy of the Deep South than did most Creeks and Seminoles. They worked as traders and factors. ... By virtue of their ancestry and upbringing, they had greater cultural, social, linguistic, and geographic ties to the colonial settlements, traveling periodically to Pensacola and the Georgia trading posts to unload their skins and pick up more trade goods.

As Andrew Frank writes, "Terms such as mixed-blood and half-breed, which imply racial categories and partial Indianness, betray the ways in which Native peoples determined kinship and identity in the eighteenth- and early-nineteen-century southeast."

=== American Revolutionary War ===
With the end of the French and Indian War (also known as the Seven Years' War) in 1763, France lost its North American empire, and British-American settlers moved inland. Indian discontent led to raids against back-country settlers, and the perception that the royal government favored the Indians and the deerskin trade led many back-country white settlers to join the Sons of Liberty. Fears of land-hungry settlers and need for European manufactured goods led the Muscogee to side with the British, but like many tribes, they were divided by factionalism, and, in general, avoided sustained fighting, preferring to protect their sovereignty through cautious participation.

During the American Revolution, the Upper Creeks sided with the British, fighting alongside the Chickamauga (Lower Cherokee) warriors of Dragging Canoe, in the Cherokee–American wars, against white settlers in present-day Tennessee. This alliance was orchestrated by the Coushatta chief Alexander McGillivray, son of Lachlan McGillivray, a wealthy Scottish Loyalist fur-trader and planter, whose properties were confiscated by Georgia. His ex-partner, Scots-Irish Patriot George Galphin, initially persuaded the Lower Creeks to remain neutral, but Loyalist Capt. William McIntosh led a group of pro-British Hitchiti, and most of the Lower Creeks nominally allied with Britain after the 1779 Capture of Savannah.

Muscogee warriors fought on behalf of Britain during the Mobile and Pensacola campaigns of 1780–81, where Spain re-conquered British West Florida. Loyalist leader Thomas Brown raised a division of King's Rangers to contest Patriot control over the Georgia and Carolina interior and instigated Cherokee raids against the North Carolina back-country after the Battle of King's Mountain. He seized Augusta in March 1780, with the aid of an Upper Creek war-party, but reinforcements from the Lower Creeks and local white Loyalists never came. Georgia militia led by Elijah Clarke retook Augusta in 1781. In 1782, an Upper Creek war-party trying to relieve the British garrison at Savannah was routed by Continental Army troops under Gen. 'Mad' Anthony Wayne.

After the war ended in 1783, the Muscogee learned that Britain had ceded their lands to the now independent United States. That year, two Lower Creek chiefs, Hopoithle Miko (Tame King) and Eneah Miko (Fat King), ceded 800 square miles (2,100 km^{2}) of land to the state of Georgia. Alexander McGillivray led pan-Indian resistance to white encroachment, receiving arms from the Spanish in Florida to fight trespassers. The bilingual and bicultural McGillivray worked to create a sense of Muscogee nationalism and centralize political authority, struggling against village leaders who individually sold land to the United States. He became a wealthy landowner and merchant, owning as many as sixty black slaves.

In 1784, he negotiated the Treaty of Pensacola with Spain, recognizing Muscogee control over 3,000,000 acres (12,000 km^{2}) of land claimed by Georgia, and guaranteeing access to the British firm Panton, Leslie & Co. which controlled the deerskin trade, while making himself an official representative of Spain. In 1786, a council in Tuckabatchee decided to wage war against white settlers on Muscogee lands. War parties attacked settlers along the Oconee River, and Georgia mobilized its militia. McGillivray refused to negotiate with the state that had confiscated his father's plantations, but President George Washington sent a special emissary, Col. Marinus Willet, who persuaded him to travel to New York City, then the capital of the U.S., and deal directly with the federal government.

In the summer of 1790, McGillivray and 29 other Muscogee chiefs signed the Treaty of New York, on behalf of the 'Upper, Middle and Lower Creek and Seminole composing the Creek nation of Indians,' ceding a large portion of their lands to the federal government and promising to return fugitive slaves, in return for federal recognition of Muscogee sovereignty and promises to evict white settlers. McGillivray died in 1793, and with the invention of the cotton gin, white settlers on the Southwestern frontier who hoped to become cotton planters clamored for Indian lands. In 1795, Elijah Clarke and several hundred followers defied the Treaty of New York and established the short-lived Trans-Oconee Republic.

=== Muscogee and Choctaw land dispute (1790) ===
In 1790, the Muscogee and Choctaw were in conflict over land near the Noxubee River. The two nations agreed to settle the dispute by ball-play. With nearly 10,000 players and bystanders, the two nations prepared for nearly three months. After a day-long struggle, the Muscogee won the game. A fight broke out and the two nations fought until sundown with nearly 500 dead and many more wounded.

=== State of Muskogee and William Bowles ===
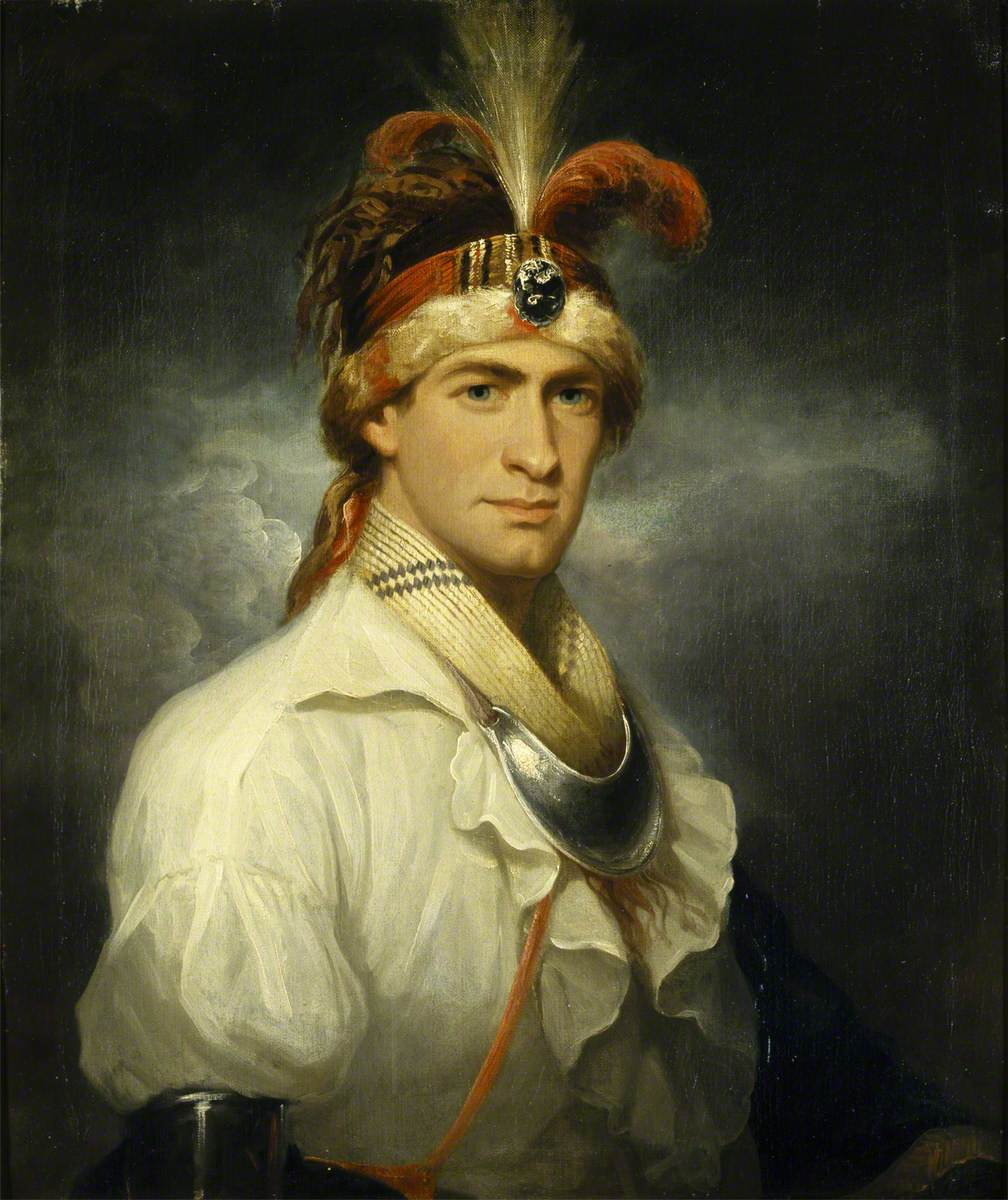
William Augustus Bowles (1763–1805) was also known as Estajoca, his Muscogee name.

William Augustus Bowles was born into a wealthy Maryland Tory family, enlisting with the Maryland Loyalists Battalion at age 14 and becoming an ensign in the Royal Navy by age 15. Cashiered for dereliction of duty after returning too late to his ship at Pensacola, Bowles escaped north and found refuge among the Lower Creek towns of the Chattahoochee basin. He married two wives, one Cherokee and the other a daughter of the Hitchiti Muscogee chieftain William Perryman, and later used this union as the basis for his claim to exert political influence among the Creeks.

In 1781, a 17-year-old Bowles led Muscogee forces at the Battle of Pensacola. After seeking refuge in the Bahamas, he travelled to London. He was received by King George III as 'Chief of the Embassy for Creek and Cherokee Nations'. It was with British backing that he returned to train the Muscogee as pirates to attack Spanish ships.

In 1799, Bowles formed the State of Muskogee, with the support of the Chattahoochee Creeks and the Seminoles. He established his capital at Miccosuki, a village on the shores of Lake Miccosukee near present-day Tallahassee. It was ruled by Mēkko Kanache, his father-in-law and strongest ally. Bowles envisioned the State of Muskogee, with its capital at Miccosuki, encompassing large portions of present-day Florida, Alabama, Georgia, North Carolina, and Tennessee, and incorporating the Cherokee, Upper and Lower Creeks, Chickasaw and Choctaw. Bowles' first act was declaring the 1796 Second Treaty of San Ildefonso, which drew the boundary between the U.S. and West Florida, null and void, because the Indians were not consulted.

He denounced the treaties Alexander McGillivray had negotiated with Spain and the U.S., threatening to declare war on the United States unless it returned Muscogee lands. He issued a death sentence against George Washington's Indian agent Benjamin Hawkins, who won the loyalty of the Lower Creeks. He built a tiny navy, and raided Spanish ships in the Gulf of Mexico. In 1800, he declared war on Spain, briefly capturing the presidio and trading post of San Marcos de Apalache before being forced to retreat.

Although a Spanish force that set out to destroy Mikosuki got lost in the swamps, a second attempt to take San Marcos ended in disaster. After a European armistice led to the loss of British support, Bowles was discredited. The Seminole signed a peace treaty with Spain in August 1802. The following year, he was betrayed by Lower Creek supporters of Hawkins at a tribal council. They turned Bowles over to the Spanish, and he died in prison in Havana, Cuba two years later.

=== Pre-removal (late 18th–early 19th centuries) ===
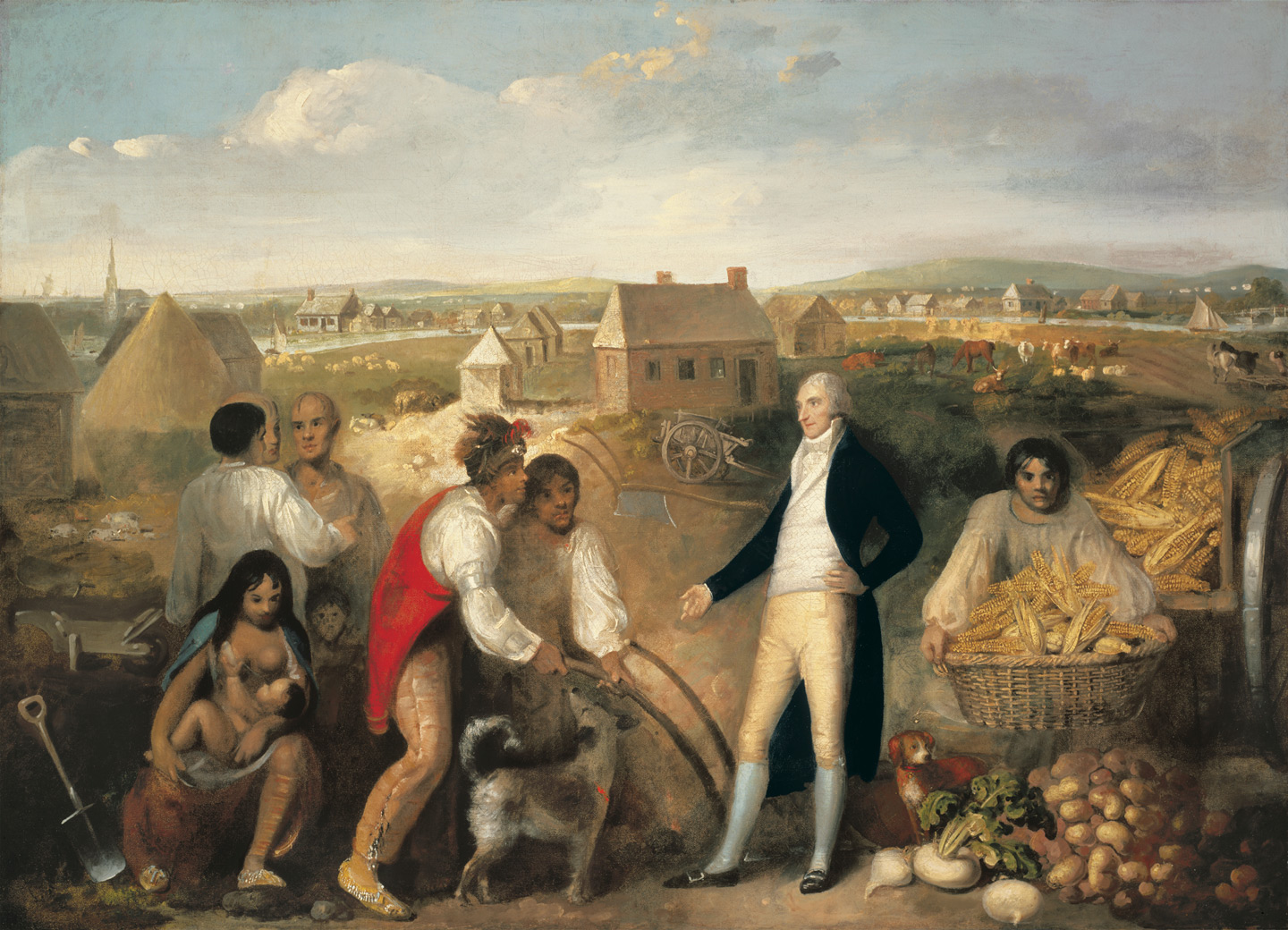
A 1805 painting of Benjamin Hawkins on his plantation, instructing Muscogee Creek in European technology

George Washington, the first U.S. president, and Henry Knox, the first U.S. Secretary of War, proposed a cultural transformation of the Native Americans. Washington believed that Native Americans were equals as individuals but that their society was inferior. He formulated a policy to encourage the "civilizing" process, and it was continued under President Thomas Jefferson. Noted historian Robert Remini wrote, "[T]hey presumed that once the Indians adopted the practice of private property, built homes, farmed, educated their children, and embraced Christianity, these Native Americans would win acceptance from white Americans."

Washington's six-point plan included impartial justice toward Indians; regulated buying of Indian lands; promotion of commerce; promotion of experiments to civilize or improve Indian society; presidential authority to give presents; and punishing those who violated Indian rights. The Muscogee would be the first Native Americans to be "civilized" under Washington's six-point plan. Communities within the Cherokee, Chickasaw, Choctaw, and Seminole tribes followed Muscogee efforts to implement Washington's new policy of civilization.

In 1796, Washington appointed Benjamin Hawkins as Principal Temporary Agent for Indian Affairs, dealing with all tribes south of the Ohio River. He personally assumed the role of principal agent to the Muscogee. He moved to the area in Creek country that is now Crawford County in Georgia. He began to teach agricultural practices to the tribe, starting a farm at his home on the Flint River. In time, he brought in slaves and workers, cleared several hundred acres, and established mills and a trading post as well as his farm. The goal was to transform the Natives into "respectable Americans" in the republic, in a way that did not involve violence.

One of the ways Hawkins did this was that he worked to change the gender roles that had been established in Creek society long before, to how the new American republic considered gender roles. For example, convincing the men to take up things like ranching and planting, and giving up things like hunting and being warriors, and for the women to leave behind their roles in farms and instead participate in "household manufactures". Hawkins also tried to convince the men to take over family property and "assume command over their wives and daughters".

There were many different factors that explained how men and women considered the plan of civilization: "Deep-seated tensions, characterized relations between sexes in the 1700s, rather than static balance; etc." Men and women were separated starting from childhood, including having masculine and feminine versions of the Muscogee language where both genders had different dialects. The men and women would live separated for weeks on end; men hunting and going to war and the women caring for the children, elderly, and making clothes and preparing food. There were many instances where men and women avoided each other in ceremonies due to fear of any type of consequences, like war, childbirth, or menstruation.

Defeat during war was seen as feminine, which was considered negative. Enemies who lost or ceded land would be degraded by being called "old women", and how it was seen as a disgrace and humiliating to be referred to as a woman. Later around the 1760s, there were changes to the deerskin trade that affected the relationship between women and men. European markets had an increased need for raw deerskin which meant that the labor of women who would dress the skins was no longer needed, while before that happened both men and women shared labor from the deerskin trade.

There was also a huge issue with drunkenness, in which the state of being drunk was associated with madness and bravery of warriors as well as distancing themselves from "household-oriented and feminine trade in clothing", because they traded deerskin for sugar-cane liquor. Creek men drank much more than the women did, many young Creek men when drunk thinking they were warriors. The women were against the behavior of how these warriors acted as well as against drinking rum.

Women's labor and manufacturing grew less needed as deerskin trade increased and the clothing was from foreign traders, their main job later being to finish the clothes with beads and gartering, but women had no say in the actual material or use of it. Even most kettles and bowls grew to be from foreign traders. There were also plantations that were started by traders, these plantations were pushing women who farmed and traded produce out of the market.

Creek women did not agree with the "masculine pursuits" that their male family members had done, including instances of hostility towards women, humiliating enemies and others by calling them "old women", the raping, murder, and mutilation of white women that happened because of how some Creek warriors violently expressed their masculinity, as well as the Creek women thinking of the safety of their own households. The women considered Hawkins "plan of civilization" around 1797 with interest compared to most of the men. The plan did not agree with the warrior culture and promised availability of goods like food and clothing. The ranchers and planters also seemed in agreement with Hawkins, while many warriors did not agree with his ideas nor liked his plan because they did not want to give up hunting or their warrior culture.

The Plan of Civilization wanted them to take up farming, which was seen as women's work and the Creek warriors resisted that because they saw it as their masculinity being taken away. The alcohol consumption among Creek men had increased because of this shift in their gender roles as many of the warriors resisted being farmers, and the violence against women, mainly domestic, also increased. While the women agreed with many of the changes and reforms that started happening from Hawkins' plan, they refused to submit to the patriarchy, and they used the economic changes to their advantage.

The Creeks had started to gain property of their own, and Hawkins had said that "they had began to know the value of property and the necessity of defending it". From the lead of Hawkins, the Creeks had formed a national police force to force Muscogees to "respect their neighbor's property", also because there were some Creeks who were protective of their land and violent in the defense of the land.

There were different changes in the settlement, those who were going by Hawkins' plan of civilization and those who did not go along with the plan that was happening under fenced communities in the Deep South. This was causing conflict between the Creek settlements.

For years, Hawkins met with chiefs on his porch to discuss matters. He was responsible for the longest period of peace between the settlers and the tribe, overseeing 19 years of peace. In 1805, the Lower Creeks ceded their lands east of the Ocmulgee to Georgia, with the exception of the sacred burial mounds of the Ocmulgee Old Fields. They allowed a Federal Road linking New Orleans to Washington, D.C. to be built through their territory. A number of Muscogee chiefs acquired slaves and created cotton plantations, grist mills and businesses along the Federal Road. In 1806, Fort Benjamin Hawkins was built on a hill overlooking the Ocmulgee Old Fields, to protect expanding settlements and serve as a reminder of U.S. rule.

Hawkins was disheartened and shocked by the outbreak of the Creek War, which destroyed his life work of improving the Muscogee quality of life. Hawkins saw much of his work toward building a peace destroyed in 1812. A faction of Muscogee joined the Pan-American Indian movement of Tenskwatawa and Tecumseh, rejecting accommodation with white settlers and adaptation of European-American culture. Although Hawkins personally was never attacked, he was forced to watch an internal civil war among the Muscogee develop into a war with the United States.

=== Comet, earthquakes, and Tecumseh (1811) ===
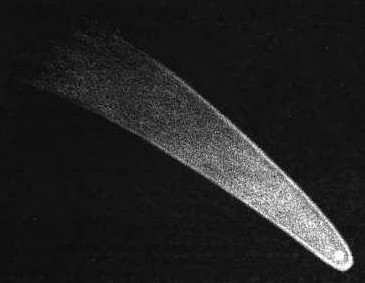
The Great Comet of 1811, as drawn by William Henry Smyth

A comet appeared in March 1811. The Shawnee leader Tecumseh, whose name meant "shooting star", traveled to Tuckabatchee, where he told the Muscogee that the comet signaled his coming. McKenney reported that Tecumseh would prove that the Great Spirit had sent him by giving the Muscogee a sign. Shortly after Tecumseh left the Southeast, the sign arrived as promised in the form of an earthquake.

On December 16, 1811, the New Madrid earthquake shook the Muscogee lands and the Midwest. While the interpretation of this event varied from tribe to tribe, one consensus was universally accepted: the powerful earthquake had to have meant something. The earthquake and its aftershocks helped the Tecumseh resistance movement by convincing, not only the Muscogee, but other Native American tribes as well, that the Shawnee must be supported.

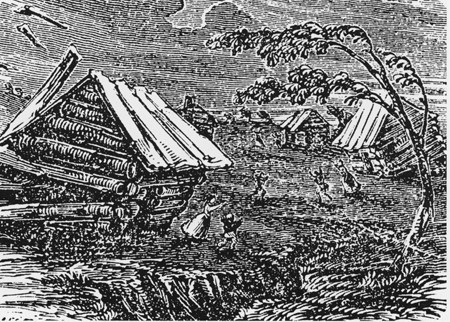
The New Madrid earthquake was interpreted by the Muscogee to support the Shawnee's resistance.

The Indians were filled with great terror ... the trees and wigwams shook exceedingly; the ice which skirted the margin of the Arkansas river was broken into pieces; and most of the Indians thought that the Great Spirit, angry with the human race, was about to destroy the world.

— Roger L. Nichols, The American Indian

The Muscogee who joined Tecumseh's confederation were known as the Red Sticks. Stories of the origin of the Red Stick name varies, but one is that they were named for the Muscogee tradition of carrying a bundle of sticks that mark the days until an event occurs. Sticks painted red symbolize war.

=== Red Stick rebellion (1813-1814) ===
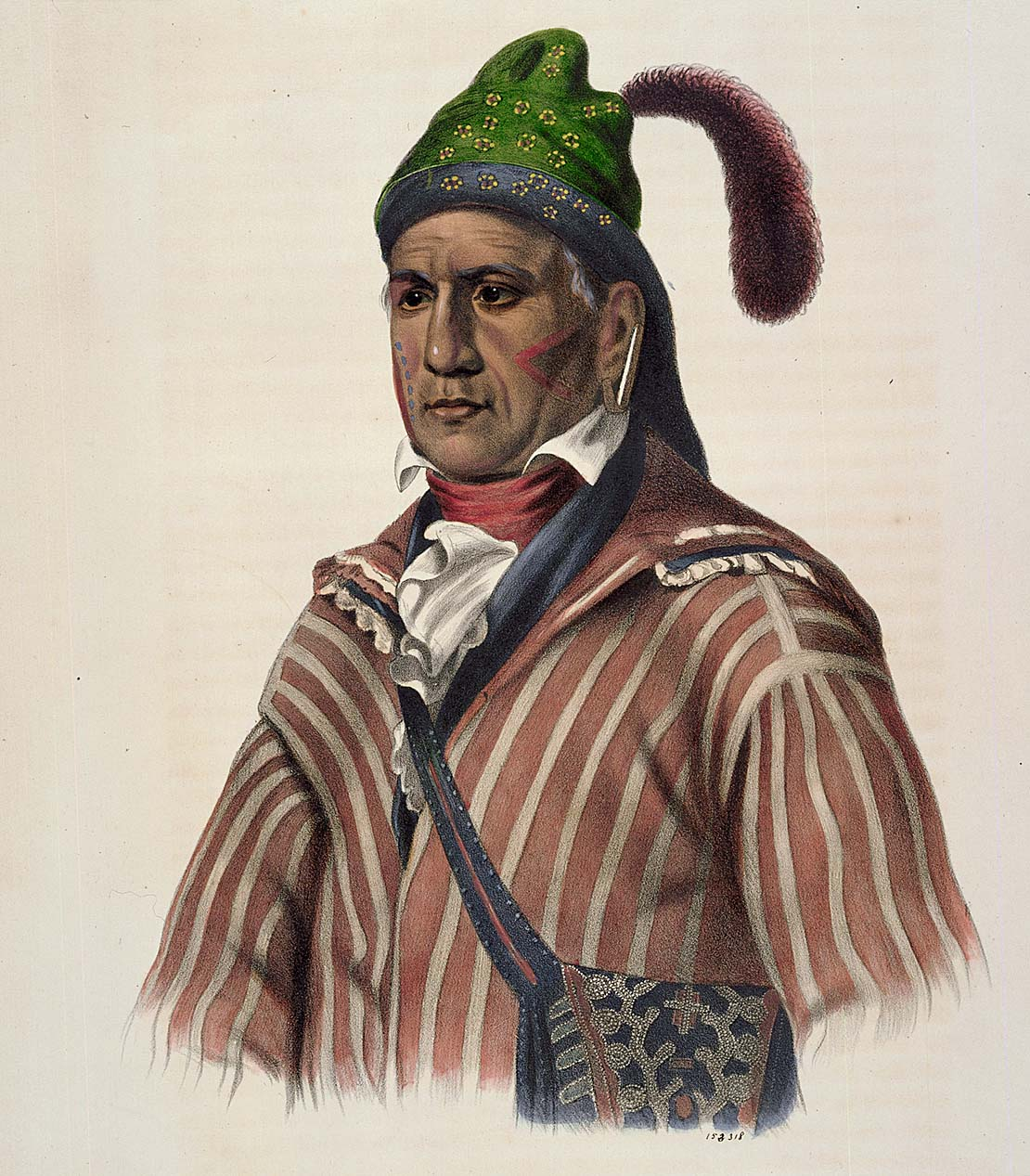
Menawa was one of the principal leaders of the Red Sticks. After the war, he continued to oppose white encroachment on Muscogee lands, visiting Washington, D.C., in 1826 to protest the treaty of Indian Springs. Painted by Charles Bird King, 1837.

The Creek War of 1813–1814, also known as the Red Stick War, began as a civil war within the Muscogee Nation, only to become enmeshed within the War of 1812. Inspired by the Shawnee leader Tecumseh (to whom 19th-century writers attributed fiery speeches that he "must have said") and their own religious leaders, and encouraged by British traders, Red Stick leaders such as William Weatherford (Red Eagle), Peter McQueen, and Menawa won the support of the Upper Creek towns.

Allied with the British, they opposed white encroachment on Muscogee lands and the "civilizing programs" administered by Indian agent Benjamin Hawkins, and clashed with many of the leading chiefs of the Muscogee Nation, most notably the Lower Creek mēkko William McIntosh, Hawkins' most powerful ally. Before the Muscogee Civil War began, the Red Sticks attempted to keep their activities secret from the "old chiefs" of the Creek national government. They were emboldened when Tecumseh rallied his followers and joined with a British invasion to capture Fort Detroit in August 1812.

In February 1813, a small party of Red Sticks, led by Little Warrior, was returning from Detroit when they killed two families of settlers along the Duck River, near Nashville. Hawkins demanded that the Muscogees turn over Little Warrior and his six companions. Instead of handing the marauders over to the federal agents, Big Warrior and the old chiefs decided to execute the war party. This decision was the spark which ignited the civil war among the Muscogee.

The first clashes between Red Sticks and the American whites took place on July 21, 1813, when a group of American soldiers from Fort Mims (north of Mobile, Alabama) stopped a party of Red Sticks who were returning from West Florida, where they had bought munitions from the Spanish governor at Pensacola. The Red Sticks fled the scene, and the U.S. soldiers looted what they found, allowing the Red Sticks to regroup and retaliate with a surprise attack that forced the Americans to retreat. The Battle of Burnt Corn, as the exchange became known, broadened the Creek Civil War to include American forces, and was interpreted as a good omen, showing that in fact the Creeks could defeat the whites.

On August 30, 1813, Red Sticks led by Red Eagle William Weatherford attacked Fort Mims, where white settlers and their Indian allies had gathered. The Red Sticks captured the fort by surprise, and carried out a massacre, killing men, women, and children. They spared only the black slaves whom they took as captured booty. After the Indians killed nearly 250–500 at the fort, settlers across the American southwestern frontier were in a panic. Although the Red Sticks won the battle, they had lost the war.

On the morning of August 30, 1813, few of Fort Mims' defenders stirred in the steaming heat. In the forested shade, the Creeks watched and waited. The fort's main gate, located on the east side of the stockade, had not been closed by the garrison troops ... No sentries occupied the blockhouse.

— A Short History of the Ft. Mims Massacre of 1813 during the Creek Indian War

The Fort Mims Massacre was followed two days later by the smaller Kimbell-James Massacre. The only explanation of this catastrophic event is that the Upper Creek leaders thought that fighting the United States was like fighting another Creek tribe, and taking Fort Mims was an even bigger victory than the Battle of Burnt Corn had been.

The Red Stick victory spread panic throughout the southeastern United States, and the cry "Remember Fort Mims!" was popular among the public wanting revenge. With Federal troops tied up on the northern front against the British in Canada, the Tennessee, Georgia, and the Mississippi Territory militias were commissioned and invaded the Upper Creek towns. They were joined by Indian allies, the Lower Creek under William McIntosh and the Cherokee under Major Ridge.

Outnumbered and poorly armed, much too far from Canada or the Gulf Coast to receive British aid, the Red Sticks put up a desperate fight. On March 27, 1814, General Andrew Jackson's Tennessee militia, aided by the 39th U. S. Infantry Regiment and Cherokee and Lower Creek warriors, crushed the Red Sticks at the Battle of Horseshoe Bend on the Tallapoosa River. Though the Red Sticks had been soundly defeated and about 3,000 Upper Muscogee died in the war, the remnants held out several months longer.

=== Muscogee diaspora (1814) ===
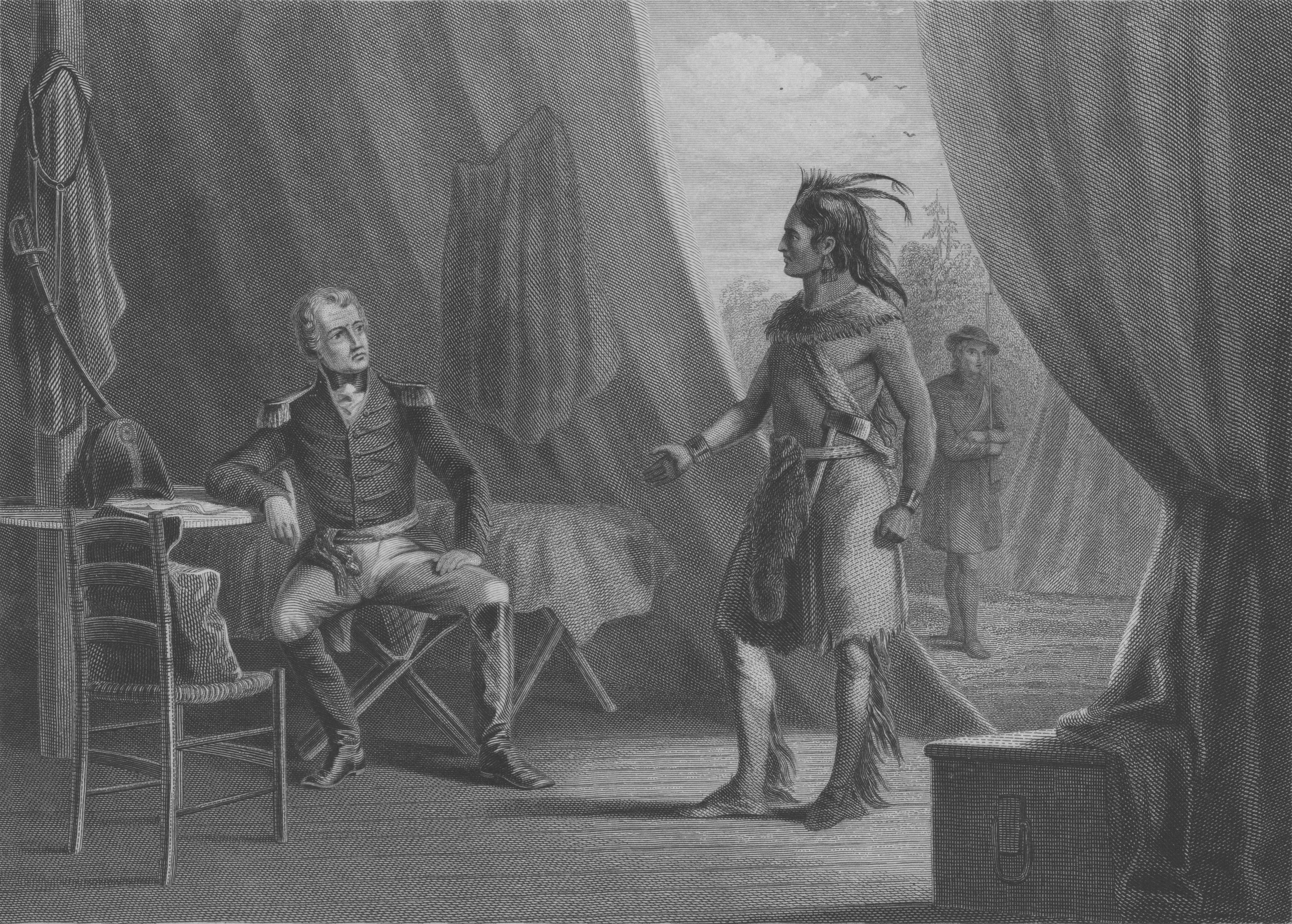
A depiction of Red Eagle's surrender to Andrew Jackson after the Battle of Horseshoe Bend. Jackson was so impressed with Weatherford's boldness that he let him go.

In August 1814, the Red Sticks surrendered to Jackson at Wetumpka (near the present city of Montgomery, Alabama). On August 9, 1814, the Muscogee nation was forced to sign the Treaty of Fort Jackson. It ended the war and required the tribe to cede some 20 million acres (81,000 km^{2}) of land—more than half of their ancestral territorial holdings—to the United States. Even those who had fought alongside Jackson were compelled to cede land, since Jackson held them responsible for allowing the Red Sticks to revolt. The state of Alabama was created largely from the Red Sticks' domain and was admitted to the United States in 1819.

WHEREAS an unprovoked, inhuman, and sanguinary war, waged by the hostile Creeks against the United States, hath been repelled, prosecuted and determined, successfully, on the part of the said States, in conformity with principles of national justice and honorable warfare … And whereas consideration is due to the rectitude of proceeding dictated by instructions relating to the re-establishment of peace: Be it remembered, that prior to the conquest of that part of the Creek nation hostile to the United States, numberless aggressions had been committed against the peace, the property, and the lives of citizens of the United States ...

— Treaty of Fort Jackson, 1814

Many Muscogee refused to surrender and escaped to Florida. They allied with other remnant tribes, becoming the Seminole. Muscogee were later involved on both sides of the Seminole Wars in Florida.

=== Seminole War ===
The Red Stick refugees who arrived in Florida after the Creek War tripled the Seminole population, and strengthened the tribe's Muscogee characteristics. In 1814, British forces landed in West Florida and began arming the Seminoles. The British had built a strong fort on the Apalachicola River at Prospect Bluff, and in 1815, after the end of the War of 1812, offered it, with all its ordnance (muskets, cannons, powder, shot, cannonballs) to the locals: Seminoles and maroons (escaped slaves). A few hundred maroons constituted a uniformed Corps of Colonial Marines, who had had military training, however rudimentary, and discipline (but whose English officers had departed). The Seminole only wanted to return to their villages, so the maroons became owners of the Fort.

It soon came to be called the 'Negro Fort' by Southern planters, and it was widely known among enslaved blacks by word of mouth – a place nearby where blacks were free and had guns, as in Haiti. The white pro-slave holding planters correctly felt its simple existence inspired escape or rebellion by the oppressed African-Americans, and they complained to the US government. The maroons had not received training in how to aim the Fort's cannons. After notifying the Spanish governor, who had very limited resources, and who said he had no orders to take action, U.S. General Andrew Jackson quickly destroyed the Fort, in a famous and picturesque, though tragic, incident in 1816 that has been called "the deadliest cannon shot in American history" (see the Battle of Negro Fort).

The Seminole continued to welcome fugitive black slaves and raid American settlers, leading the U.S. to declare war in 1817. In 1818, General Andrew Jackson invaded Florida with an army that included more than 1,000 Lower Creek warriors; they destroyed Seminole towns and captured Pensacola. Jackson's victory forced Spain to sign the Adams–Onís Treaty in 1819, ceding Florida to the U.S. In 1823, a delegation of Seminole chiefs met with the new U.S. governor of Florida, expressing their opposition to proposals that would reunite them with the Upper and Lower Creek, partly because the latter tribes intended to enslave the Black Seminoles. Instead, the Seminoles agreed to move onto a reservation in inland central Florida.

=== Treaties of Indian Springs ===
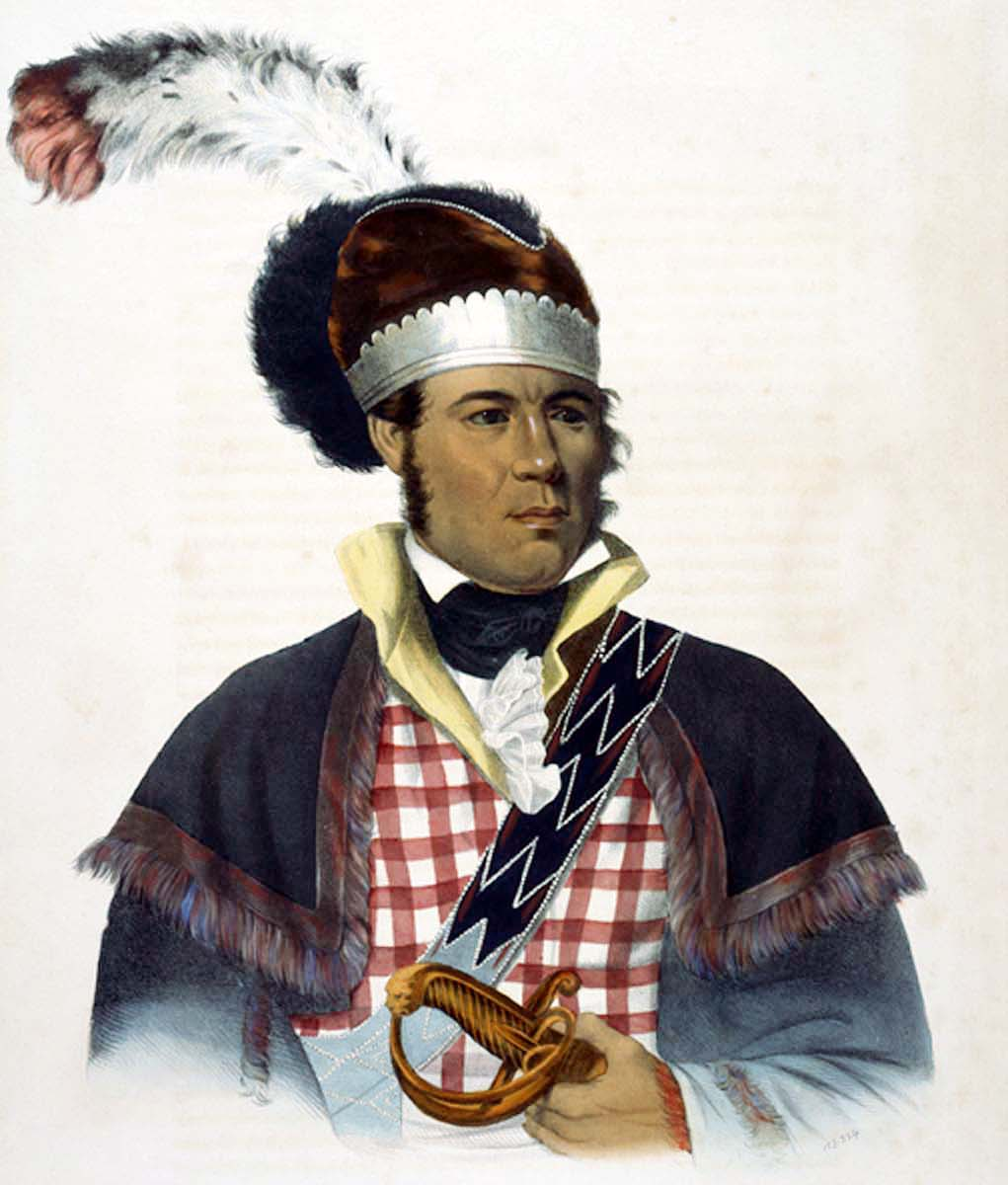
Charles Bird King's portrait of William McIntosh

Mēkko William McIntosh led the Lower Creek warriors who fought alongside the U.S. in the Creek War and the First Seminole War. The son of the Loyalist officer of the same name who had recruited a band of Hitchiti to the British cause, McIntosh never knew his white father. He had family ties to some of Georgia's planter elite, and after the wars became a wealthy cotton-planter. Through his mother, he was born into the prominent Wind Clan of the Creek; as the Creek had a matrilineal system of descent and inheritance, he achieved his chieftainship because of her. He was also related to Alexander McGillivray and William Weatherford, both mixed-race Creek.

In the late 1810s and early 1820s, McIntosh helped create a centralized police force called 'Law Menders,' establish written laws, and form a National Creek Council. Later in the decade, he came to view relocation as inevitable. In 1821, McIntosh and several other chiefs, including Chief Shelocta, signed away Lower Creek lands east of the Flint River at the first Treaty of Indian Springs. As a reward, McIntosh was granted 1,000 acres (4 km^{2}) at the treaty site, where he built a hotel to attract tourists to local hot springs.

The Creek National Council responded by prescribing the death penalty for tribesmen who surrendered additional land. Georgian settlers continued to pour into Indian lands, particularly after the discovery of gold in northern Georgia. in 1825 McIntosh and his first cousin, Georgia Governor George Troup, a leading advocate of Indian removal, signed the second Treaty of Indian Springs at his hotel. Signed by six other Lower Creek chiefs, the treaty ceded the last Lower Creek lands to Georgia, and allocated substantial sums to relocate the Muscogee to the Arkansas River. It provided for an equally large payment directly to McIntosh.

In April, the old Red Stick Menawa led about 200 Law Menders to execute McIntosh according to their law. They burned his upper Chattahoochee plantation. A delegation of the Creek National Council, led by the speaker Opothleyahola, traveled to Washington D.C. to protest the 1825 treaty. They convinced President John Quincy Adams that the treaty was invalid, and negotiated the more favorable Treaty of Washington (1826). The tribe ceded their lands to Georgia in return for $200,000, although they were not required to move west. Troup ignored the new treaty and ordered the eviction of the Muscogee from their remaining lands in Georgia without compensation, mobilizing state militia when Adams threatened federal intervention.

The government and people of the United States will always find the Muscogees anxious to preserve peace and do justice; and all they ask in return is to be treated in like manner, and spared the afflictions in which the people of Georgia appear determined to involve them. Justice is Justice. There is not one kind for the White man and another for the Red man.

— Opothle Yoholo, John Stidham, Mad Wolf, Menawee, Yoholo Micco, Tuskeekee Tustenuggee, Charles Cornnels, Apauli Tustenuggee, Selocta, Timpoochy Bamnett, Coosa Tustenuggee, Nahetlue Hopie, Ledagee, March 3, 1826

=== Removal (1834) ===
In the aftermath of the Treaty of Fort Jackson and the Treaty of Washington (1826), the Muscogee were confined to a small strip of land in present-day east central Alabama.

Andrew Jackson was inaugurated president of the United States in 1829, and with his inauguration the government stance toward Indians turned harsher. Jackson abandoned the policy of his predecessors of treating different Indian groups as separate nations. Instead, he aggressively pursued plans to move all Indian tribes living east of the Mississippi River to Oklahoma.

Friends and Brothers – By permission of the Great Spirit above, and the voice of the people, I have been made President of the United States, and now speak to you as your Father and friend, and request you to listen. Your warriors have known me long You know I love my white and red children, and always speak with a straight, and not with a forked tongue; that I have always told you the truth ... Where you now are, you and my white children are too near to each other to live in harmony and peace. Your game is destroyed, and many of your people will not work and till the earth. Beyond the great River Mississippi, where a part of your nation has gone, your Father has provided a country large enough for all of you, and he advises you to remove to it. There your white brothers will not trouble you; they will have no claim to the land, and you can live upon it you and all your children, as long as the grass grows or the water runs, in peace and plenty. It will be yours forever. For the improvements in the country where you now live, and for all the stock which you cannot take with you, your Father will pay you a fair price ...

— President Andrew Jackson addressing the Creeks, 1829

At Jackson's request, the United States Congress opened a fierce debate on an Indian Removal Bill. In the end, the bill passed, but the vote was close. The Senate passed the measure 28 to 19, while in the House it squeaked by, 102 to 97. Jackson signed the legislation into law June 30, 1830.

Following the Indian Removal Act, in 1832 the Creek National Council signed the Treaty of Cusseta, ceding their remaining lands east of the Mississippi to the U.S., and accepting relocation to the Indian Territory. Most Muscogee were removed to Indian Territory during the Trail of Tears in 1834, with additional removals following the Creek War of 1836, although some remained behind.

By 1836, when extensive Creek removal was underway, Eneah Emathala emerged as leader of the Lower Creeks ... their desire was only to be left alone in their homeland ... Gen. Winfield Scott was ordered to capture Eneah Emathala ... Captured with Emathala were some one thousand other person ... their [racial] colors were black, red, and white ...

— Burt & Ferguson- Indians of the Southeast: Then and Now

=== American Civil War (1861) ===
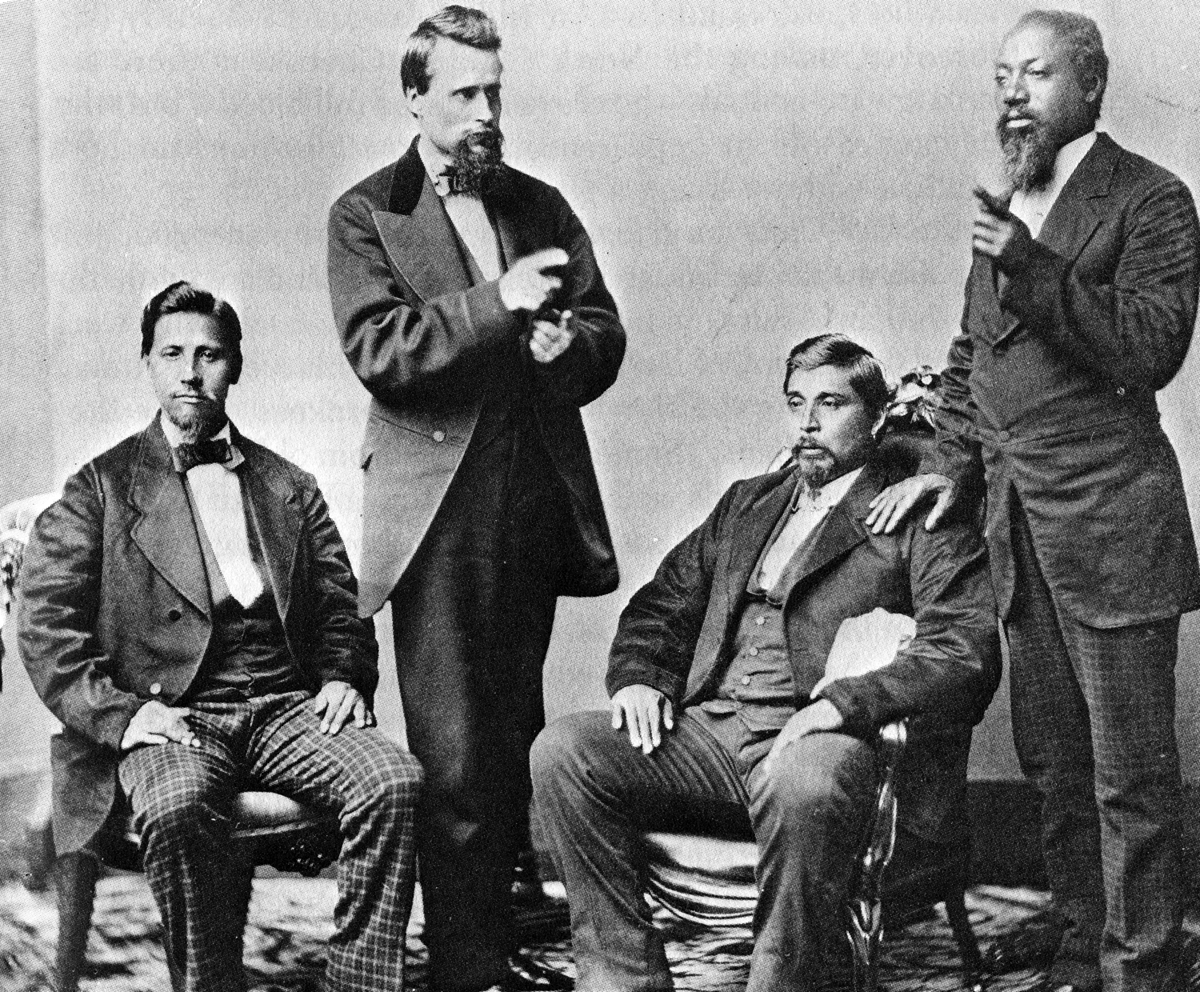
Members of the Creek Nation in Oklahoma around 1877. They included men of mixed Creek, European and African ancestry.

At the outbreak of the American Civil War, Opothleyahola refused to form an alliance with the Confederacy, unlike many other tribes, including many of the Lower Creeks. Runaway slaves, free blacks, Chickasaw and Seminole Indians began gathering at Opothleyahola's plantation, where they hoped to remain neutral in the conflict between the North and South. On August 15, 1861, Opothleyahola and tribal chief Micco Hutko contacted President Abraham Lincoln to request help for the Union loyalists. On September 10, they received a positive response, stating the United States government would assist them. The letter directed Opothleyahola to move his people to Fort Row in Wilson County, Kansas, where they would receive asylum and aid. They became known as Loyalists, and many were members of the traditional Snake band in the latter part of the century.

Because many Muscogee Creek people did support the Confederacy during the Civil War, the US government required a new treaty with the nation in 1866 to define peace after the war. It required the Creek to emancipate their slaves and to admit them as full members and citizens of the Creek Nation, equal to the Creek in receiving annuities and land benefits. They were then known as Creek Freedmen. The US government required setting aside part of the Creek reservation land to be assigned to the Freedmen. Many of the tribe resisted these changes. The loss of lands contributed to problems for the nation in the late 19th century.

The Loyalists among the Creek tended to be traditionalists. They formed the core of a band that became known as the Snakes, which also included many Creek Freedmen. At the end of the century, they resisted the extinguishing of tribal government and break-up of communal tribal lands enacted by the US Congress with the Dawes Commission of 1892. These efforts were part of the US government's attempt to impose assimilation on the tribes, to introduce household ownership of land, and to remove legal barriers to the Indian Territory's achieving statehood.

Members of the Creek Nation were registered as individuals on the Dawes Rolls. The Commission separately registered intermarried whites and Creek Freedmen, whether or not they had any Creek ancestry. This ruined their claims to Creek membership later, even for people who had parents or other relative who were Creek. The Dawes Rolls have been used as the basis for many tribes to establish membership descent. European-American settlers had moved into the area and pressed for statehood and access to some of the tribal lands for settlement.

=== Today ===
Some Muscogee in Alabama live near the federally recognized Poarch Creek Reservation in Atmore northeast of Mobile, Alabama, and Muscogee live in essentially undocumented ethnic towns in Florida. The Alabama reservation includes a casino and 16-story hotel. The Creek tribe holds an annual powwow on Thanksgiving. Additionally, Muscogee descendants of varying degrees of acculturation live throughout the southeastern United States. The majority of the Muscogee citizens live in Oklahoma, where the Muscogee Reservation is located. The Muscogee Nation is headquartered out of the nation's capital Okmulgee. The Muscogee Nation has over 100,000 citizens as of 2024, The Muscogee Nation has increased in popularity due to the television series Reservation Dogs, which follows the lives of four Creek teens in Oklahoma.

== Culture ==
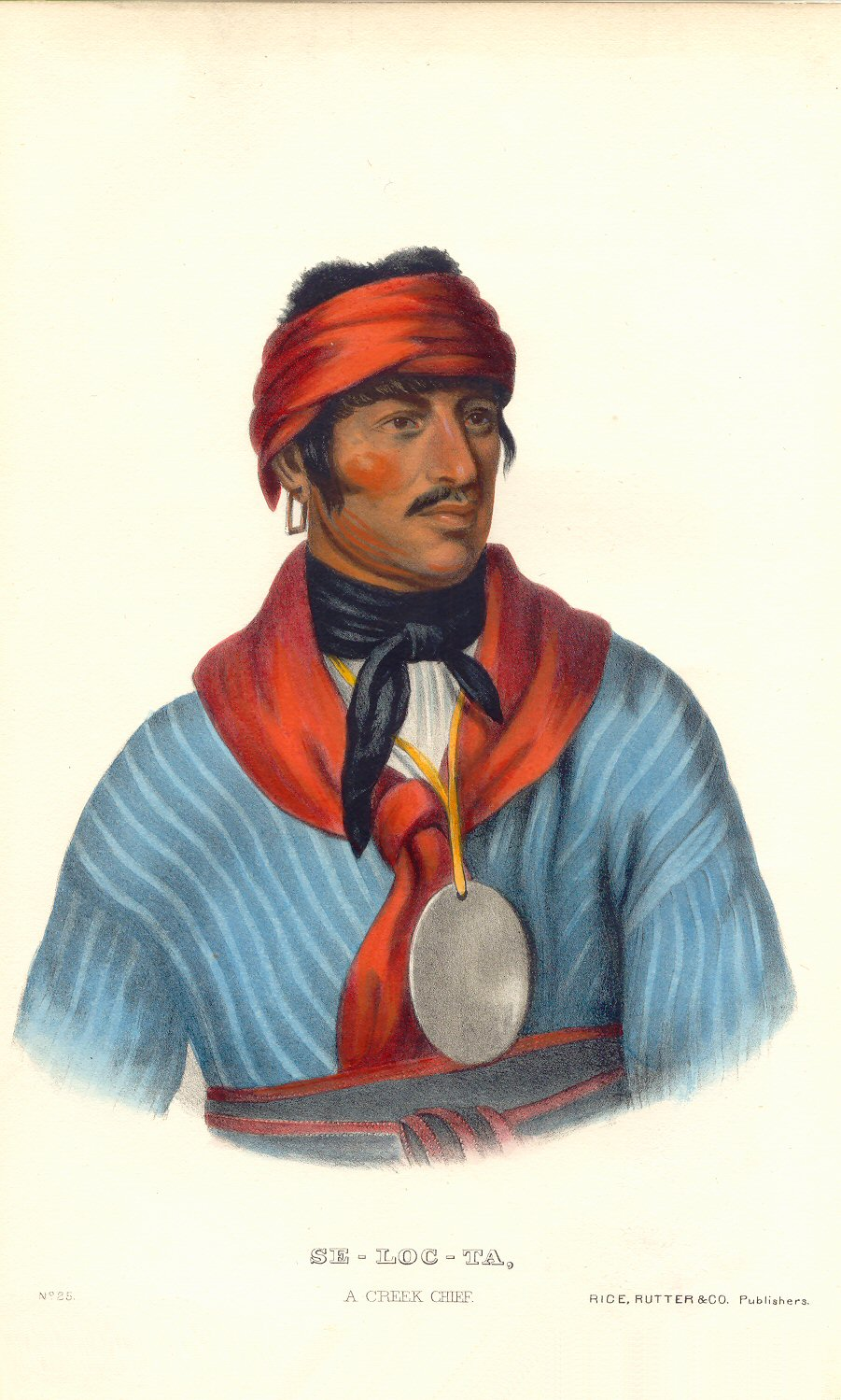
Selocta Chinnabby (or Shelocta) was a Muscogee chief.

Muscogee culture has greatly evolved over the centuries, combining mostly European-American influences; however, interaction with Spain, France, and England greatly shaped it as well. They were known for their rapid incorporation of modernity, developing a written language, transitioning to yeoman farming methods, and accepting European-Americans and African-Americans into their society. Muscogee people continue to preserve chaya and share a vibrant tribal identity through events such as annual festivals, stickball games, and language classes. The Stomp Dance (opvnkv-haco) and Green Corn Ceremony (Posketv-Rakko) are revered gatherings and rituals.

=== Clans ===
While families include people who are directly related to each other, clans are composed of all people who are descendants of the same ancestral clan grouping. Like many Native American nations, the Muscogee Creek are matrilineal; each person belongs to the clan of their mother, who belongs to the clan of her mother. Inheritance and property are passed through the maternal line. Hereditary chiefs were born into certain clans.

Biological fathers are important within the family system but must come from another clan than the mother. But, within the clan, it is the mother's brother (the mother's nearest blood relation) who functions as the primary teacher, protector, disciplinarian and role model for children, especially for boys. Clan members do not claim "blood relation" but consider each other as family due to their membership in the same clan. This is expressed by their using the same kinship titles for both family and clan relations. For example, clan members of approximately the same age consider each other "brother" and "sister", even if they have never met before.

Because of this system, the Muscogee Creek children born of European fathers belonged to their mother's clans and were part of their tribal communities. High-ranking daughters of chiefs often found it advantageous to marry European traders, who could provide their families with goods. Muscogee Creek believed young men who became educated in European ways could help them manage under the new conditions related to colonialism, while preserving important Muscogee Creek cultural institutions.

Muscogee clans are as follows:

- Alligator Clan (Hvlepvtvlke)
- Aktayahche Clan (Aktvyahcvlke)
- Bear Clan (Nokosvlke) (also "Muklasalgi")
- Beaver Clan (Eccaswvlke, Echasvlke) (also "Itamalgi", "Isfanalgi")
- Bird Clan (Fuswvlke)
- Bog Potato Clan (Vhvlvkvlke) (aka Sweet Potato Clan)
- Cane Clan (Kohvsvlke)
- Deer Clan (Ecovlke)
- Fish Clan (Rvro-vlke)
- Fox Clan (Culvlke)
- Goat Clan (Cowatvlke)
- Hickory-Nut Clan (Ocē-vlke)
- Kapitchalki Clan (Kvpeccvlke)
- Maize Clan (Vce-vlke)
- Mole Clan (Tvkusvlke)
- Otter Clan (Osvnvlke)
- Panther Clan (Kaccvlke) (also "Chukotalgi")
- Raccoon Clan (Wotkvlke) (also "Wahlakalgi")
- Salt Clan (Okcvnwvlke) (also "Okilisa")
- Skunk Clan (Konepvlke)
- Snake Clan (Cettvlke)
- Toad Clan (Sopaktvlke) (also "Pahosalgi")
- Tamalki Clan (Tvmvlke)
- Turkey Clan (Penwvlke)
- Turtle Clan (Lucvlke) – related to Wind Clan
- Waksalki Clan (Waksvlke)
- Wild-Cat Clan (Kowakkucvlke)
- Wind Clan (Hotvlkvlke)
- Wolf Clan (Yvhvlke) – related to Bear Clan.

=== Clothing ===
Ancestral Muscogee peoples wore clothing made of woven plant materials or animal hides, depending upon the climate. During the summer, they preferred lightweight fabrics woven from tree bark, grasses, or reeds. During the harsh winters, they used animal skins and fur for warmth.

During the 17th century, the Muscogee adopted some elements of European fashion and materials. As cloth was lighter and more colorful than deer hide, it quickly became a popular trade item throughout the region. Trade cloth in a variety of patterns and textures enabled Muscogee women to develop new styles of clothing, which they made for both men, women, and children. They incorporated European trade items such as bells, silk ribbons, glass beads, and pieces of mirror into the clothing.

=== Language ===
The Muscogee language is a member of the Muskogean family and was well known among the frontiersmen, such as Gideon Lincecum, of the early 19th century. The language is related to the Choctaw language, with some words being identical in pronunciation. The following table is an example of Muscogee text and its translation:

Mvskoke: Fayet aresasvtēs. Mont fayēpat vrēpēt omvtēs, hopvyēn. Momēt vrēpēt omvtētan, nake punvttv tat pvsvtēpet, momet hvtvm efvn sulkēn omvtēs. Momet mv efv tat efv fayvlket omekv, nak punvttuce tayen pvsvtēpēt omvtēs. Mont aret omvtētan, efv tat estvn nak wohēcēto vtēkat, nake punvttvn oken mv efv-pucase enkerrēt omvtēs.
English: Someone was hunting. He went hunting in far away places. He went continually, killing small game, and he had many dogs. And the dogs were hunting dogs, so he had killed many animals. When hunting, he always knew his dogs had an animal trapped by the sound of their barking.

== Treaties ==
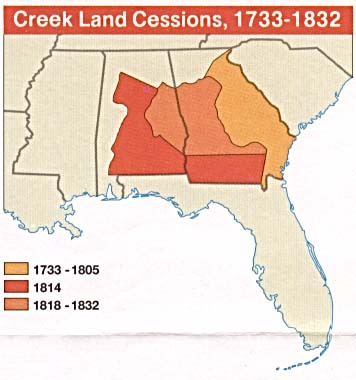
Muscogee Creek land cessions 1733–1832

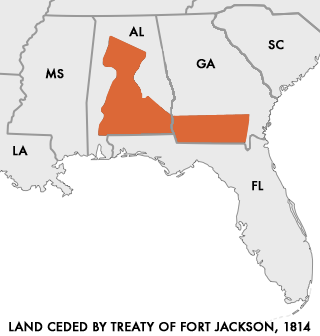
Ceded area as deemed by the Treaty of Fort Jackson in 1814

Land was the most valuable asset, which the Native Americans held in collective stewardship. The southern English colonies, US government and settlers systematically obtained Muscogee land through treaties, legislation, and warfare. Some treaties, such as the Treaty of San Lorenzo, indirectly affected the Muscogee. The treaties were:

Treaty	Year	Signed with	Where	Purpose	Ceded Land
Treaty of Savannah	1733	Colony of Georgia	?	?	?
Treaty of Coweta Town	1739	Colony of Georgia	?	?	?
Treaty of Savannah	1757	Colony of Georgia	?	?	?
Treaty of Shoulder-bone Creek	1786	State of Georgia	Sparta, Georgia	Land cession	All lands east of the Oconee River
Treaty of New York	1790	United States	New York City	Boundaries defined, Civilization of Creek, Animosities to cease	?
Treaty of Colerain	1796	United States	Colerain (Camden County, Georgia)	Boundary lines, Animosities to cease	?
Treaty of Fort Wilkinson	1802	United States	Fort Wilkinson	Land cession	?
Treaty of Washington	1805	?	?	?	?
Treaty of Fort Jackson	1814	United States	Fort Jackson near Wetumpka, Alabama	Land cession	23 million acres (93,000 km^{2})
Treaty of the Creek Agency	1818	?	?	?	?
Treaty of the Indian Spring	1821	?	?	?	?
Treaty of Indian Springs	1825	?	?	?	?
Treaty of Washington	1826	?	?	?	?
Treaty of the Creek Indian Agency	1827	?	?	?	?
Treaty of Cusseta	1832	United States	Washington City	create allotments	
Treaty with the Creeks	1833	?	?	?	?
Treaty with the Creeks	1838	?	?	?	?
Treaty with the Creeks And Seminole	1845	?	?	?	?
Treaty with the Creeks	1854	?	?	?	?
Treaty with the Creeks, Etc.,	1856	?	?	?	?
Treaty with the Creeks	1866	?	?	?	?

=== Indian Appropriations Act of 1871 ===
In 1871, Congress added a rider to the Indian Appropriations Act to end the United States' recognizing additional Indian tribes or nations, and prohibiting additional treaties.

That hereafter no Indian nation or tribe within the territory of the United States shall be acknowledged or recognized as an independent nation, tribe, or power with whom the United States may contract by treaty: Provided, further, that nothing herein contained shall be construed to invalidate or impair the obligation of any treaty heretofore lawfully made and ratified with any such Indian nation or tribe.

— Indian Appropriations Act of 1871

== Population history ==
Early estimates of the Creek probably did not cover the whole nation but just parts of the population. James Seagrove, an ambassador for the US to the Creek Nation and merchant who lived in southern Georgia, estimated the Creek population in 1794 at 10,000 warriors, and therefore around 50,000 people. In 1789, Henry Knox wrote that the Creek lived in at least 100 towns and villages. A census taken in 1832 reported 22,700 Creeks and 900 Black slaves.

in 1836, following the Creek War, the Treaty of Fort Jackson, the Treaty of Washington (1826), the Second Creek War and the removal to Oklahoma, Indian Affairs reported 17,894 Creeks already removed to Oklahoma, while an estimated 4,000 remained east of the Mississippi. In 1841, according to Indian Affairs, the number of Creeks in Oklahoma, removed west of the Mississippi, was 24,549, while 744 still remained in the east. In 1857, Henry Schoolcraft reported the Creek population at 28,214 people. It appears that Creek population declined during the subsequent years. Enumeration published in 1886 estimated only around 14,000 Creeks in Oklahoma (Indian Territory) as of 1884. In 1910, Indian Affairs reported 11,911 in Oklahoma. The census of 1910 counted 6,945 Creeks.

The Creek population has rebounded in the 20th and 21st centuries. According to the 2018 American Community Survey there were 107,370 people with Creek ancestry, including 50,168 in Oklahoma. In the 2010 census 48,352 people reported being full-blood Creek (4,596 more people reported being full-blood Native, but tribally mixed, with partially Creek ancestry). The 2020 census reported at least 45,092 full-blood Creeks.

== Muscogee tribes today ==
The Coushatta Tribe of Louisiana are a tribe of Muscogee people, descended from the Koasati, as are the Alabama-Coushatta Tribes of Texas.

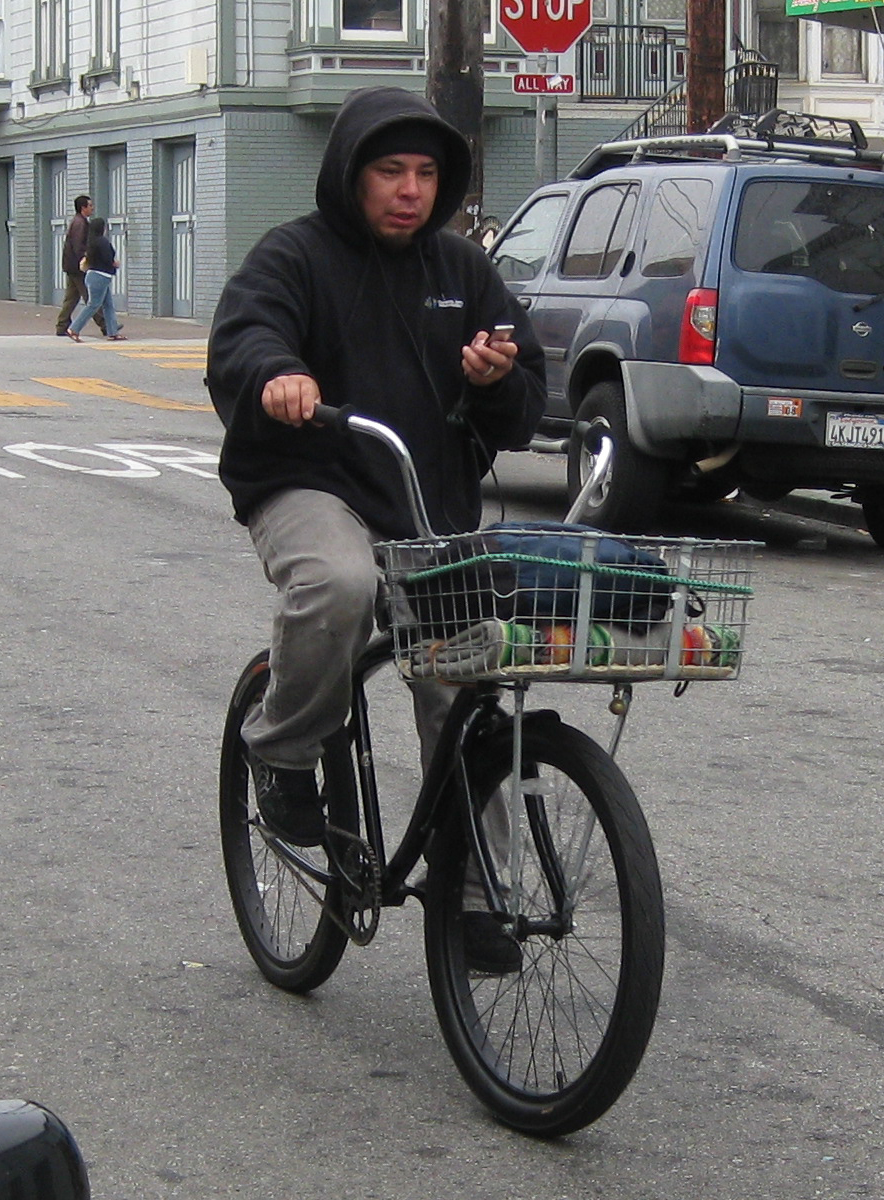
A Muscogee Creek-Navajo from Okmulgee, Oklahoma

=== Federally recognized tribes in Oklahoma ===
The Muscogee (Creek) Nation is a federally recognized Indian Nation. Their headquarters is in Okmulgee, Oklahoma. Their current Principal Chief is David W. Hill.

Three Muscogee tribal towns are federally recognized tribes: Alabama-Quassarte, Kialegee, and Thlopthlocco. Alabama-Quassarte Tribal Town is headquartered in Wetumka, Oklahoma and its chief is Wilson Yargee. Kialegee Tribal Town is headquartered in Wetumka. Jeremiah Hoia is the current mēkko or chief. The Thlopthlocco Tribal Town is headquartered in Okemah, Oklahoma. George Scott is the mēkko.

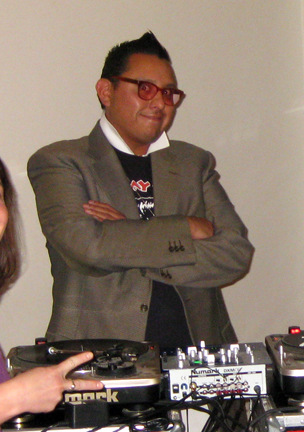
Micah Wesley, Muscogee Creek-Kiowa artist and DJ

=== Federally recognized tribes in Alabama ===
Eddie L. Tullis led the Poarch Band of Creek Indians in their petitioning the United States government to recognize a government-to-government relationship. On August 11, 1984, these efforts culminated in the United States Government, Department of Interior, and the Bureau of Indian Affairs acknowledging that the Poarch Band of Creek Indians existed as an "Indian Tribe". The tribe is the only federally recognized tribe in the state of Alabama.

On November 21, 1984, the US government took 231.54 acres (0.9370 km^{2}) of land into trust for the tribe as a communal holding. On April 12, 1985, 229.54 acres (0.9289 km^{2}) were declared a reservation.

=== Expansion of reservation ===
The United States Supreme Court issued their ruling for McGirt v. Oklahoma on July 9, 2020. The Court recognized a large part of eastern Oklahoma as part of the state's Muscogee (Creek) Nation reservation. The ruling also opened the possibility for Native Americans to have more power to regulate alcohol and casino gambling.

== Notable historical Muscogee people ==
Muscogee people from the 20th and 21st centuries will be listed under their respective tribes.

- William Augustus Bowles (1763–1805), also known as Estajoca, Maryland-born English adventurer and organizer of Muscogee Creek attempts to create a state outside of Euro-American control
- Samuel Benton Callahan (1833–1911), represented the Creek and Seminole nations in the Second Confederate Congress
- Stella Mason (unknown–1918), she was subject to a known lawsuit, highlighting a pattern of abuse against Freedmen among the Five Civilized Tribes.
- Alexander McGillivray, Hoboi-Hili-Miko (1750–1793), principal chief of the Upper Creek towns during the American Revolution
- William McIntosh (c. 1775–1825), Muscogee chief prior to removing to Indian Territory led part of the pro-American Muscogee forces against the Red Sticks
- Menawa (c. 1765 – c. 1836) was a principal leader of the Red Sticks during the Creek Wars.
- Mary Musgrove (c. 1700–1765) served as a cultural liaison between colonial Georgia and the Muscogee Creek community.
- Opothleyahola (c. 1798–1863), speaker, Muscogee chief, warrior leader during first two Seminole Wars and the Civil War, treaty signer, American ally
- Tomochichi (1644–1741), Creek chief who mediated with the British who established colonial Georgia, and Senauki, his wife and partial heir
- William Weatherford, also known as Red Eagle (c. 1781 – 1824), leader of the Red Sticks during the Creek Wars

== See also ==
- Black Seminoles
- Battle of Burnt Corn
- College of the Muscogee Nation
- Crazy Snake Rebellion
- Etowah Indian Mounds
- Fushatchee
- Green corn ceremony
- List of sites and peoples visited by the Hernando de Soto Expedition
- Muskogee, Oklahoma
- Nuyaka (Creek Nation)
- Ocmulgee Mounds National Historical Park
- Stomp dance
