= Treaty of Washington (1826) =

1826 treaty between the United States and Muscogee

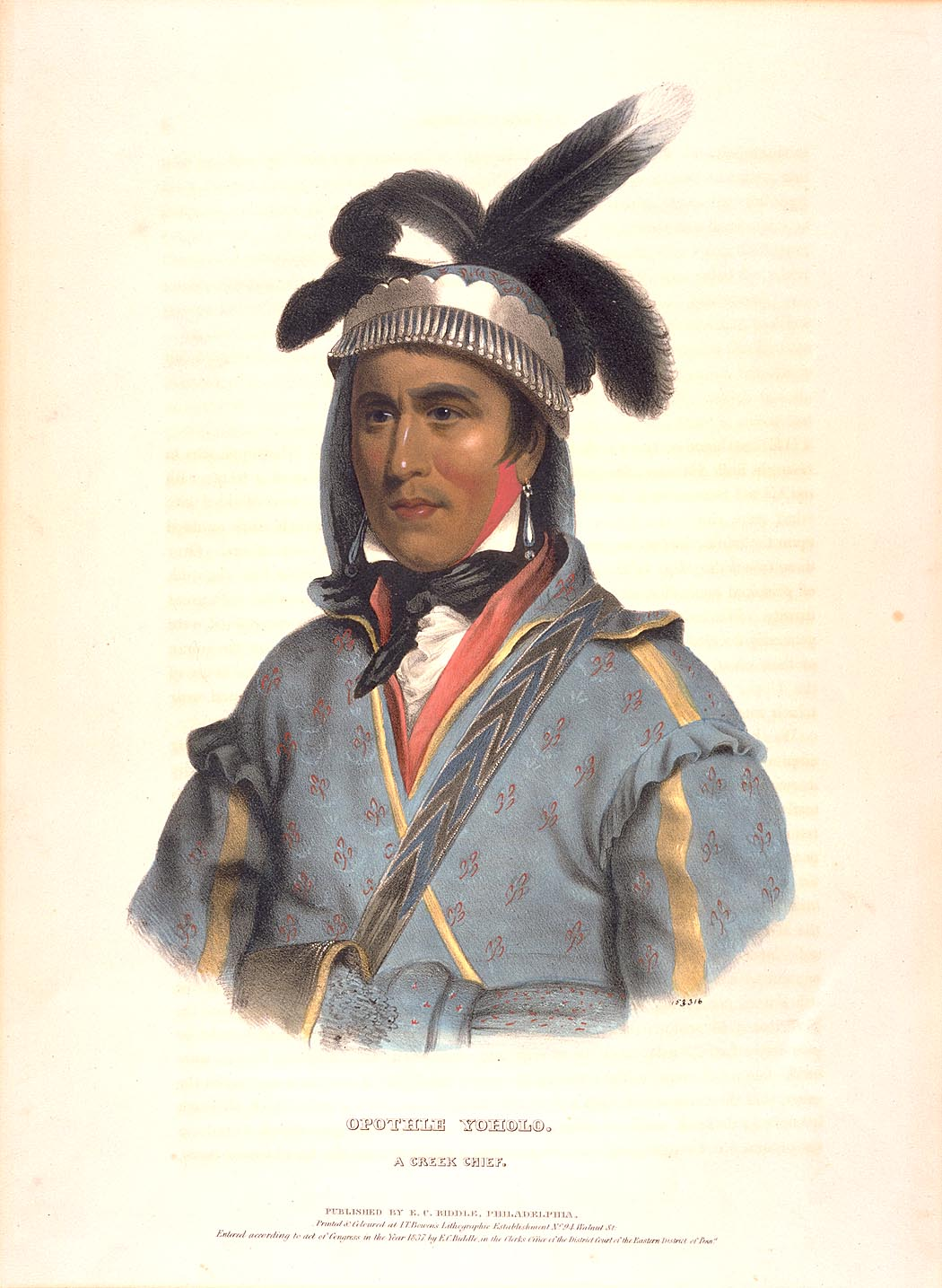
Opothleyahola

The 1826 Treaty of Washington was a treaty between the United States and the Creek Confederacy, led by Opothleyahola. The Creek National Council ceded much of their territory bordering Georgia to the United States.

The Creek Confederacy was a confederation of nations with diverse customs and histories. Over several decades, they had ceded small portions of their vast territory to the United States in various treaties. They had been allies with the Great Britain in the War of 1812. The 1814 Treaty of Fort Jackson which ended the Creek War stipulated that the Creeks would cede 23 million acres (93,000 km^{2}) of prime territory to the United States, leaving the Creeks a tract around the Chattahoochee River. The Creek Confederacy enacted a law that made further land cessions a capital offense. However, by mid-1820s, both political parties in Georgia favored the total removal of Native Americans west of the Mississippi River. Democratic governor George Troup aggressively moved to resolve the situation.

The Lower Creek Council, a small faction led by Troup's first cousin, William McIntosh, signed the Treaty of Indian Springs on February 13, 1825, ceding a large amount of Creek territory to the United States. However, the other chiefs and warriors (particularly the Upper Creeks) protested the treaty, stating that the signatories did not have the sovereign authority to act on behalf of the Creek Nation. McIntosh was executed on May 31, 1825, for violating Creek law prohibiting unauthorized territorial cessions.

President John Quincy Adams did not consider the treaty to be valid, and pressured Troup to stop white incursions onto Creek territory. Creek leaders traveled to Washington, D.C. to negotiate a peace treaty. A new treaty was negotiated between the United States and a widespread gathering of various Creek leaders, unified under the leadership of Opothleyahola. It voided the Treaty of Indian Springs and ceded to the United States all Creek territory on the east side of the Chattahoochee River for a one-time payment of $217,600 and a yearly annuity of $20,000. The treaty stipulated that the signatories of the Treaty of Indian Springs would have the same privileges as those who signed the new treaty, and made funding allowances for the Lower Creeks under the late William McIntosh to send a five-person deputation to explore lands west of the Mississippi River for potential resettlement. The United States would then fund the relocation, as well as providing for a full year's subsistence, a full-time U.S. Indian Agent, an interpreter, a blacksmith and a wheelwright. The treaty provided financial remuneration for the damages caused by the infighting between McIntosh's Lower Creeks and the rest of the Creek Nation. The Creeks legally retained possession of all their lands until January 1, 1827, after which they would retain a small portion on the Alabama-Georgia border.

The treaty was signed on January 24, 1826. A supplementary article signed on March 31, 1826, corrected some errors and stipulated the exact delineation of the boundary between Georgia and the Creek reserve. The United States agreed to pay the Creek Nation $30,000 (equivalent to $853,676 in 2025) for yet another piece of territory in what became Carroll County.

Not pleased with the new treaty and under intense pressure from expansionists, Troup ordered the land surveyed for a lottery, including the piece that was to remain in Creek jurisdiction. President Adams intervened by deploying American soldiers, but Troup called out the state militia, and Adams, fearful of a civil war, conceded. The United States government allowed Troup to quickly renegotiate the agreement and seize all remaining Creek territory bordering Georgia. By 1827, citizens of the Creek Nation were removed from Georgia. Within eight years, most of them would be relocated from Alabama to the designated Indian Territory (modern Oklahoma).
