= Jim Boy =

Muscogee war chief (1792–1851)

- Tstvnvke Emarv; Kvsehtv Haco
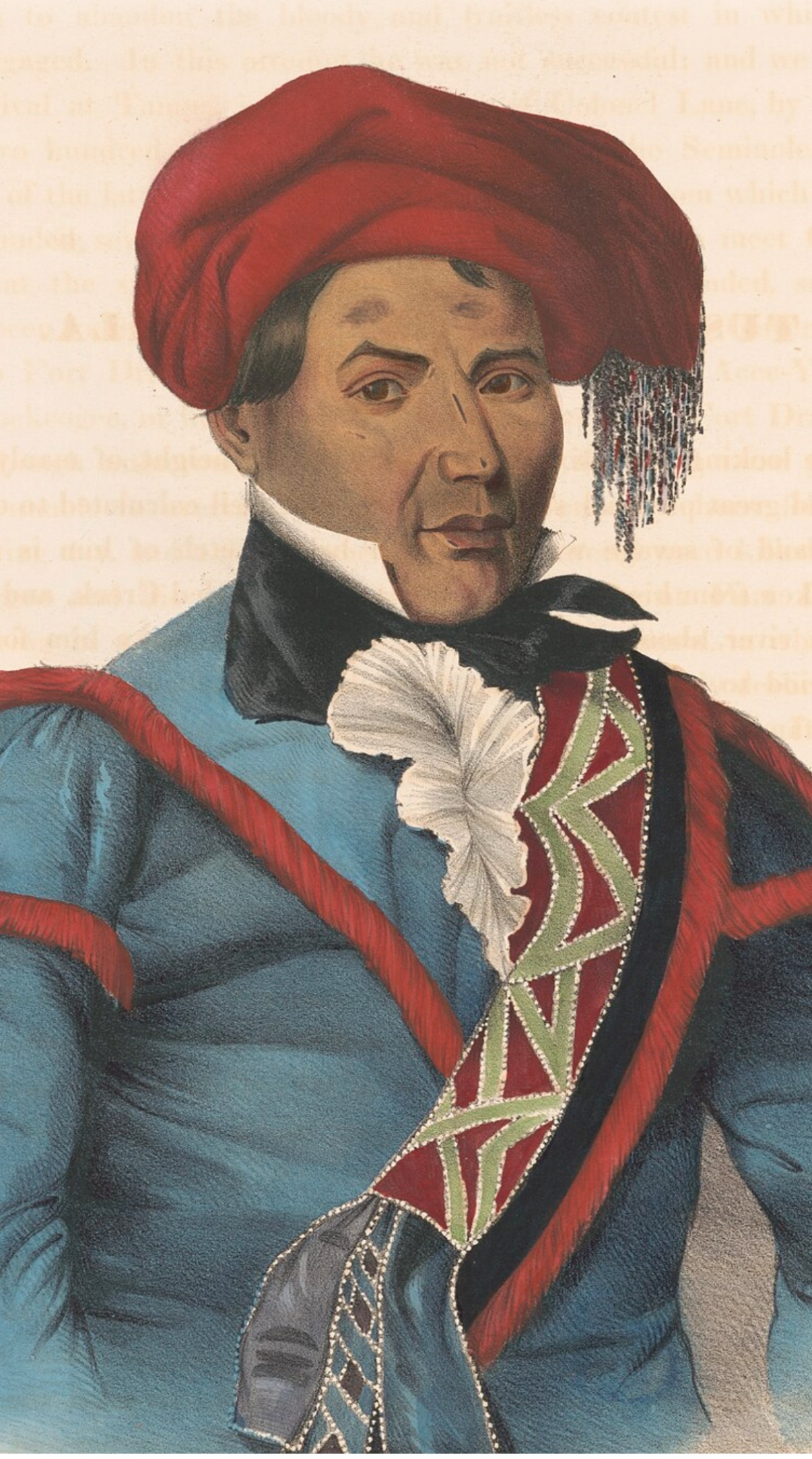
- Jim Boy, chief of the Autsi, Red Sticks prophet (Charles Bird King, c. 1836)
- Born: c. 1792 "On the Tallapoosa River," possibly at Autsi
- Died: 1851 (aged 60–61); Creek Nation, Indian Territory
- Other names: Jim Boy; High Head Jim; High-Headed Jim; Gun Boy; "Tustennuggee Emathla or Jim Boy, a Creek chief"; Tuskegee; Sanota; Kasita Hadjo; Justen Nuggee Emathla; cussetaw Tus to nug gie
- Title: Headman of Hoithlewaule; Headman of Clewalla; Headman of Thlobthlocco; Kvsehtv Haco; Tstvnvke Emarv

Jim Boy, or High Head Jim, (c. 1792–1851) also called Tustennuggee Emathla and Kasita Hadjo, was a 19th-century Native American leader of the Creek Confederacy (Muscogee, Mvskoke) in southeastern North America. He was associated with the Red Sticks political party within the tribe, and has been classed as one of the "prophets" of that era. He was "almost certainly" of mixed Creek–Black ancestry. He fought semi-organized American militia during the First Creek War, mostly notably at the Battle of Burnt Corn in 1813, and saved the lives of his adoptive mother and sisters at Fort Mims. Some 20 years later, during the Andrew Jackson administration, he was recruited by the United States Army to fight the Seminoles in Florida during the Second Seminole War, in exchange for promised money, debt forgiveness, and protection for his family back in Alabama. His wife, children, and slaves were deported while he was still in service; four of his children and three of his slaves were among the estimated 250–325 people killed in the steamboat Monmouth disaster on the Mississippi River in 1837. Following the expulsion and deportation of the Five Civilized Tribes from their ancestral lands east of the Mississippi, Jim Boy and his family settled on the Creek Nation land in what is now eastern Oklahoma.

== Name ==
His portrait is plate 6 in volume 11 (P27759) of McKenney and Hall's History of the Indian Tribes of North America with the caption "Tustennuggee Emathla or Jim Boy, a Creek chief". Tustennuggee Emathla, or Tstvnvke Emarv, is not exactly a name, but a title; it translates very roughly to warrior of experience and rank. His many names have complicated his biography; most sources assert that that Jim Boy and High-Head Jim are the same historical character, but in 2006 archaeologist Christopher Waselov wrote, "The Creek who rescued McGirth was Jim Boy, possibly the same man known as High-Head Jim, though probably not."

== Early life and Fort Mims ==
Jim Boy's birthplace and the identities of his biological parents are not reported in extant histories of the Muscogee. There are semi-reliable statements of his age that place his birth year in either 1791 or 1793. According to a 1939 account by Alabama state archivist Peter A. Brannon, Jim Boy was "an orphan entitled to the chieftancy of the Atassees...reared in the family of Mrs. Zack McGirth, widow of Gen. Alexander McGillivray, [he] grew up with her daughters. He saved the life of Mrs. McGirth and her girls and protected them from harm at the Fort Mims massacre." The Fort Mims Restoration Association website retells this story from McGirth's point of view and calls Jim Boy Sanota. Zack McGirth ran a whiskey still on Persimmon Creek (GNIS 152875), "near a lettered beech tree on the Federal Road," possibly slightly to the east of Fort Hull. McGirth was married to Vicey Cornells, said to be "the second daughter of Joe Cornells."

A man who investigated the execution of William McIntosh noted in his journal that Jim Boy "had negro blood." Ethan Allen Hitchcock described Jim Boy in his war journals as "a colored mixed." Thomas L. McKenney asserted that Jim Boy was "a full-blooded Creek." He is named as Jim Boy in some accounts and High Head Jim or High-Headed Jim in others. The name by which he is identified in the primary portrait of him is a title held by Muscogee and Seminole leaders, but researchers disagree as to how many ranks actually existed and the correct terminology for the different ranks. Most of the literature points to four ranks of warriors: unranked warriors (little emarthla or tasikyalgi), warriors (big emarthla or tastanagi), war chiefs (tustennuggee or tastanagi tako), and the Great Warrior (tustennuggee thlocco or isti puccanchau thlucco). Warriors of higher ranking were provided seating at council meetings around the squareground, the center of Creek life and their talwa settlements."

== First Creek War and interwar period ==
During the Creek War of 1813–1814 he was "Chief of the Autosees". According to an affidavit by bilingual Muscogee-native planter and interpreter named Sam Moniac (also called Sam Manac or Totkes Hajou), he encountered High Head Jim during the second week of July 1813, who apprised of the optimistic Indigenous war plan to arm the tribes with British weapons and ammunition and unite against the American settlers who encircled them:

I went up to my house on the road, and found some indians camped near it. Who I tried to avoid but could not. An Indian came to me who goes by the name of High Headed Jim, and who had been appointed to head a party sent from the Auttacee Town on the Tallapoose, on a trip to Pensacola. He shook hands with me & immediately began to tremble & jerk in every part of his frame, and the very calves of his legs would be convulsed, and he would get entirely out of breath with the agitation. This Practice was introduced in May & June last by the prophet Francis who says that he was so instructed by the Spirit. High Headed Jim asked me what I meant to do. I said that I should sell my property and buy ammunition & join them. He then told me that they were going down to Pensacola, to get ammunition, and that they had got a letter from a British General, which would enable them to receive ammunition from the Governor. That it had been given to the Little Warrior & saved by his Nephew when he was killed and sent down to Francis. High head told me that when they went back with their supply another body of men would go down for another supply of ammunition and that ten men were to go out of each Town and that they calculated on five horseloads for every Town. He said that they were to make a general attack on the American Settlements that the Indians on the Waters of the Coose & Tallapoose & on the Black Warrior were to attack the settlements on the Tombigby & Alabama particularly the Tensaw & fork Settlements. That the Creek Indians bordering on the Cherokees were to attack the people of Tennessee & that the Seminolees & lower Creeks were to attack the Georgians—That the Choctaws also had joined them and were to attack the Mississippi Settlements. That the attack was to be made at the same time in all places when they got furnished with ammunition.

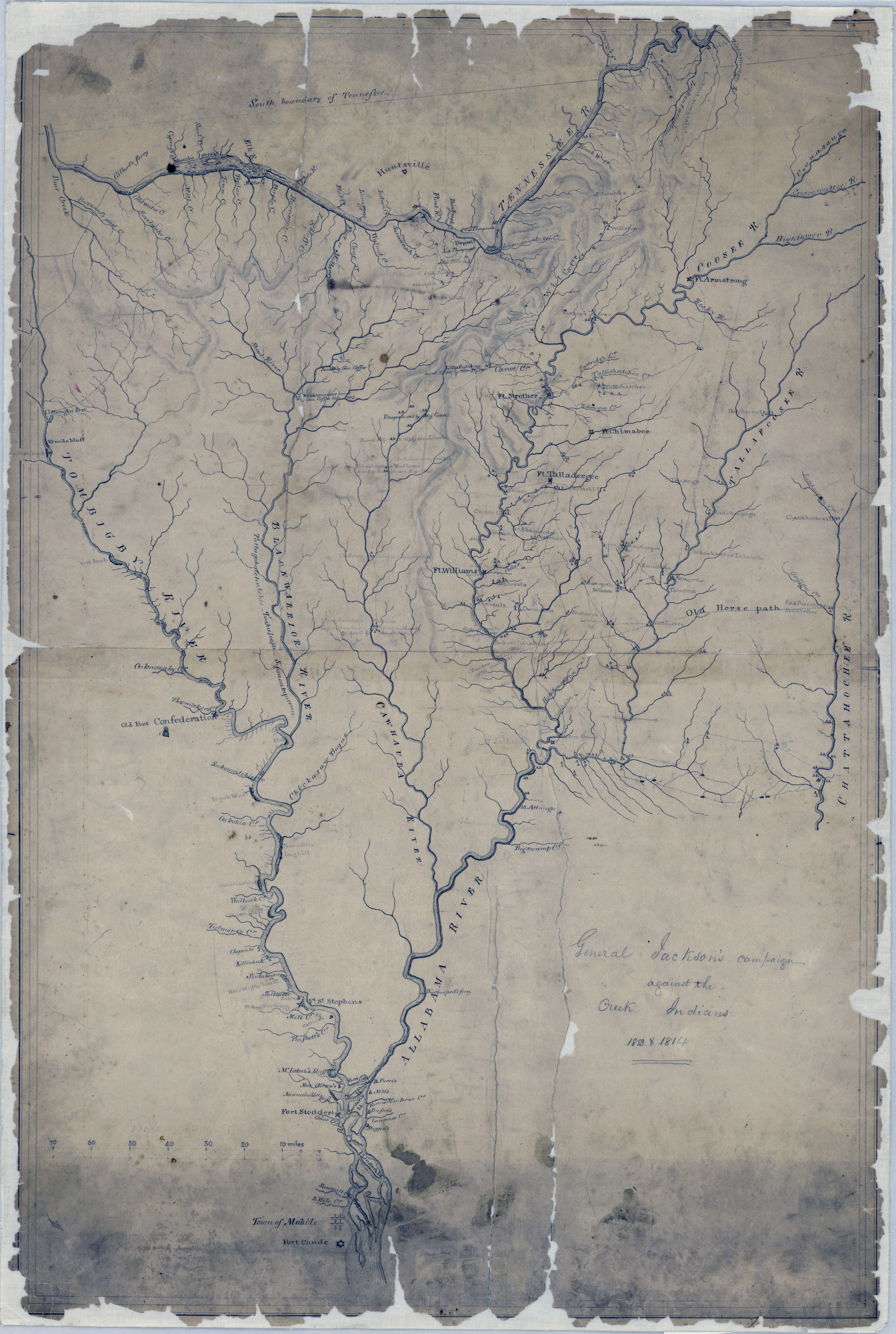
"General Jackson's campaign against the Creek Indians 1813 & 1814," showing the Muscle Shoals of the Tennessee River and the Alabama River watershed (NAID 102279378)

In the telling of American general and Muscogee chronicler Thomas Simpson Woodward, the Battle of Burnt Corn was an unplanned skirmish fought when Jim Boy and Peter McQueen were returning from a mission to Pensacola to buy ammunition for the obviously forthcoming war; "I have heard Jim tell it often, that if the whites had not stopped to gather up pack horses and plunder their camp, and had pursued the Indians a little further, they [the Indians] would have quit and gone off. But the Indians discovered the very great disorder the whites were in, searching for plunder, and they fired a few guns from the creek swamp and a general stampede was the result. McGirth always corroborated Jim Boy's statement as to the number of Indians in the Burnt Corn fight. I have seen many of those that were in the fight, and they were like the militia that were at Bladensburg—they died off soon; you never could hear much talk about the battle, unless you met with such a man as Judge Lipscomb, who used to make a laughing matter of it." Jim was at the Fort Mims massacre on August 30, 1813, "Jim Boy succeeded in saving Mrs. McGirth and her daughter, but her only son, James, was killed...After the Fort fell, and Jim Boy saved Mrs. McGirth and tried to save others, the Indians ran him off, and it was some time before they would be reconciled to him."

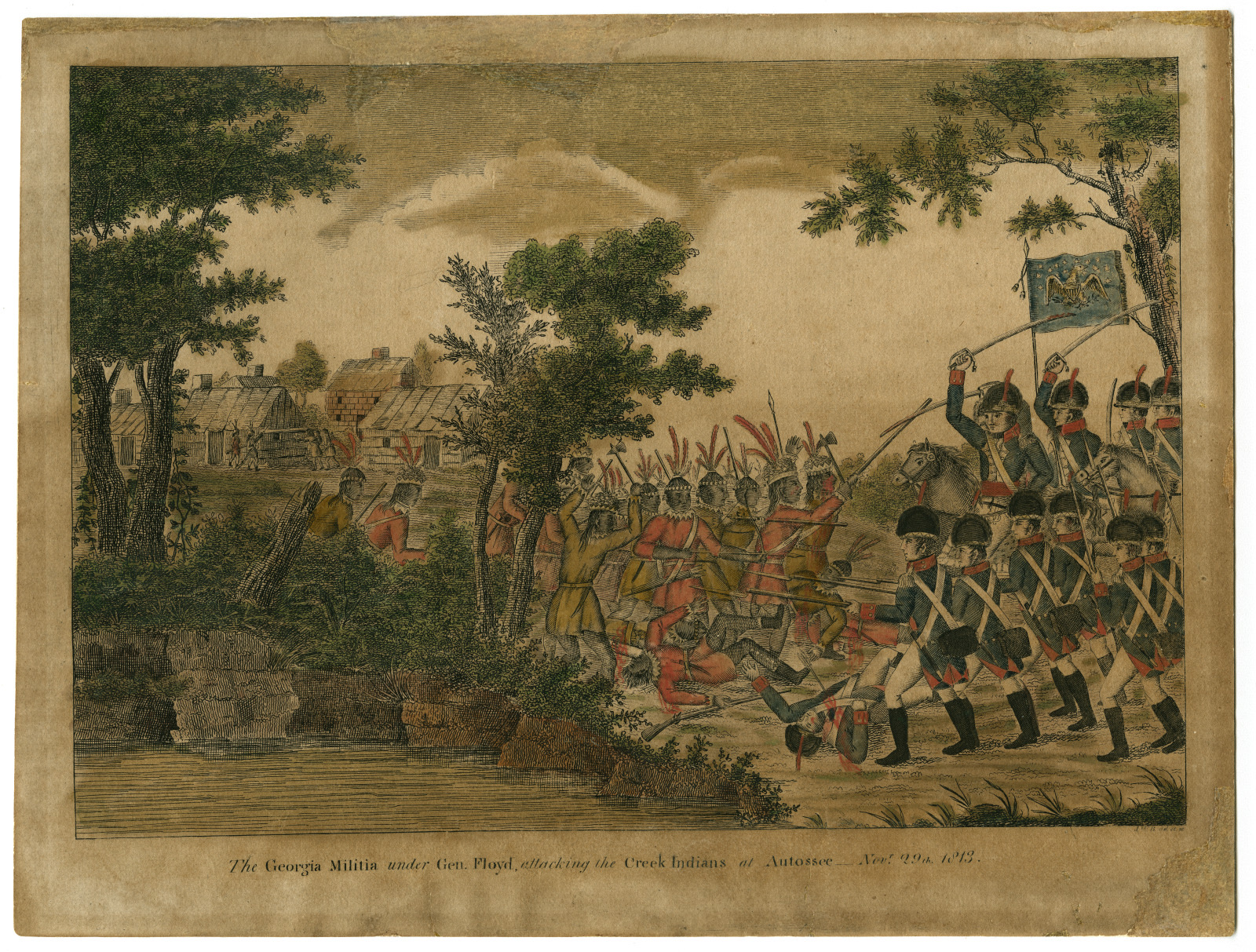
Atasi, the namesake village of Jim Boy's clan, was destroyed by troops led by John Floyd on November 29, 1813 at the Battle of Autossee (Historic New Orleans Collection, MSS 557.9.166)

The settlement of Atasi was destroyed by the Georgia militia at the Battle of Autossee of November 29, 1813. According to the account of George Stiggins, "In said Autussee battle the hostiles supposed that they lost in killed Eighty men and upwards of a hundred wounded their complete defeat with the burning of their town broke up the hostile settlement in the Autussees[.] it gave them a complete scare and set them to rambling[.] many of them took up their quarters in the Othlewalle camps[.] some made their way with their families to inaccessible places in the swamps of the forest and others went for Pensacola for safety among the Spaniards, the hostile camps by this time began to feel the want of ammunition there being a general scarcity of that article among them, so there was a general meeting called by the hostile chiefs and prophets, to take into view their situation and state of affairs..." The account of the mixed-race Indian trader and Indian agent Stiggins, written in the 1830s, also states that Jim was called Cussetaw Haujo (Kvsehtv Haco) and asserts (inaccurately, it seems) that he was killed at the Battle of Calebee Creek.

After the war Jim Boy lived at Thlopthlocco near Polecat Spring and Cubahatchee Creek (GNIS 151750), a left-hand tributary of the Tallapoosa River. Thlopthlocco means "big cane" or "tall reed" (perhaps originally referring to nearby canebrakes), and is pronounced "thlop-thloc'-oh." Polecat Spring was on the main road from Chattahoochee and was the site of an Indian subagency. It was located in what is now Macon County, Alabama, near Shorter.

In 1818, during the First Seminole War, Jim Boy reportedly fought with William McIntosh "against the Seminoles". Another account names him as Gun Boy and reports that he was taken prisoner by the Americans "before Fort Gaines." Thus, writes historian Kathryn Braund, there is no agreement on Jim Boy's involvement in the first Seminole War.

== Treaties, pre-expulsion era ==
Following the Treaty of Indian Springs in 1825, as Creek headmen were trying to discourage voluntary immigration to the west, "Tuskeneah...along with the former Red Stick prophet Jim Boy, drew a sword and threatened to kill John Reed of Thlewallee and William J. Wills of Thlakatchka while at Reed's mother's house near Line Creek." In 1832, Jim Boy was listed on the "Parsons and Abbot Census as the headman of Cle walla Town (Hoithlewaule). That town was a Red Stick town during the Creek War."

Jim Boy lived about 30 mi (48 km) west of Montgomery, on the way to Auburn, and a little southwest of Tuskegee. This land was ceded to the U.S. government in 1832 at the Treaty of Cusseta. He was "one of the 90 'mile chiefs' selected by the Creeks in Council to receive a full section of land under the 1832 Treaty of Washington."

Western land reserves that were to distributed to the Creeks in exchange for the eastern lands were handed out in a disorderly manner. In addition to poor recordkeeping and mismatches of who was supposed to be entitled to get what, Seminoles Coathlocco, Talladig Harjo, Cochus Harjo, and Charley Emathla of Davy's (or Cockrane's) town "were persuaded by the Creek Indian Jim Boy to emigrate from Florida to Alabama and acquire land under the 1832 treaty".

== Second Creek War ==
During the Second Creek War in 1836, "he attached himself to the friendly party." He led a troop of counterinsurgents "who aided the United States during the war" who "happened upon Neah Micco's camp in June 1836 and found captured slaves, as well as expensive furniture, writing paper, china, and cut glass. They also found provisions such as 'purloined beef, bacon, and pork in large quantities, both cooked and uncooked.'" Jim Boy led the detachment that captured Neah Emathla.

== Second Seminole War ==
Solicited by Thomas Jesup of the United States Army, he and Paddy Carr led 767 Creeks against Seminoles in the Second Seminole War. According to historian Christopher Haveman, U.S. Army officers "enticed the Creeks to volunteer with various promises. For instance, the Creek headmen who served in Florida received $10,000―to be disposed of as they may see fit, if the Creeks under their command performed in good faith. The government also promised to use their 1837 annuity to pay off accumulated debts and to get clear of the ruinous suits against them. An agent was also appointed to settle their land claims. The Creeks who served were organized into companies and paid for their services as soldiers. Those with horses were paid as mounted volunteers. In addition to the government's offerings, the Creeks made demands of their own. The first was that their family members be allowed to remain in Alabama under the protection of the federal government until their tour-of-duty was completed. The government subsequently placed the Creek family members in three large encampments at Polecat Springs, Echo Harjo's home thirty miles east of Polecat Springs, and at Fort Mitchell. Here the relatives of the warriors were issued provisions and protected from local white settlers."

Map of East Florida (published 1840) showing locations of Dade's Battle and the Battle of Wahoo Swamp

These Creeks were organized into a regiment and put under command of Major David Moniac. Jim Boy fought with this regiment in the Battle of Wahoo Swamp in November 1836 and the Battle of Lake Monroe in February 1837. In fall 1837 over 2,000 Creeks "still remained at Mobile Point waiting for their warriors to be discharged from service in Florida. While the delay in the return of the Creek warriors from Florida had allowed the Creek family members in Alabama to be victimized by white settlers, the delay also allowed the Creeks now at Mobile Point to be exposed to sickness," and people began dying from "diarrhea, dysentery, and intermittent fever." After being relocated for a time to the more healthful Pass Christian, on October 16, 1837, headman Jim Boy and approximately 200–300 other Muscogee boarded the steamboat Mazeppa for New Orleans where they transferred to the steamboat Cavalier to travel up the Mississippi River and thence to the Arkansas River en route to Fort Gibson, in what is now Muskogee County, Oklahoma.

== Removal, disaster, and Indian territory ==
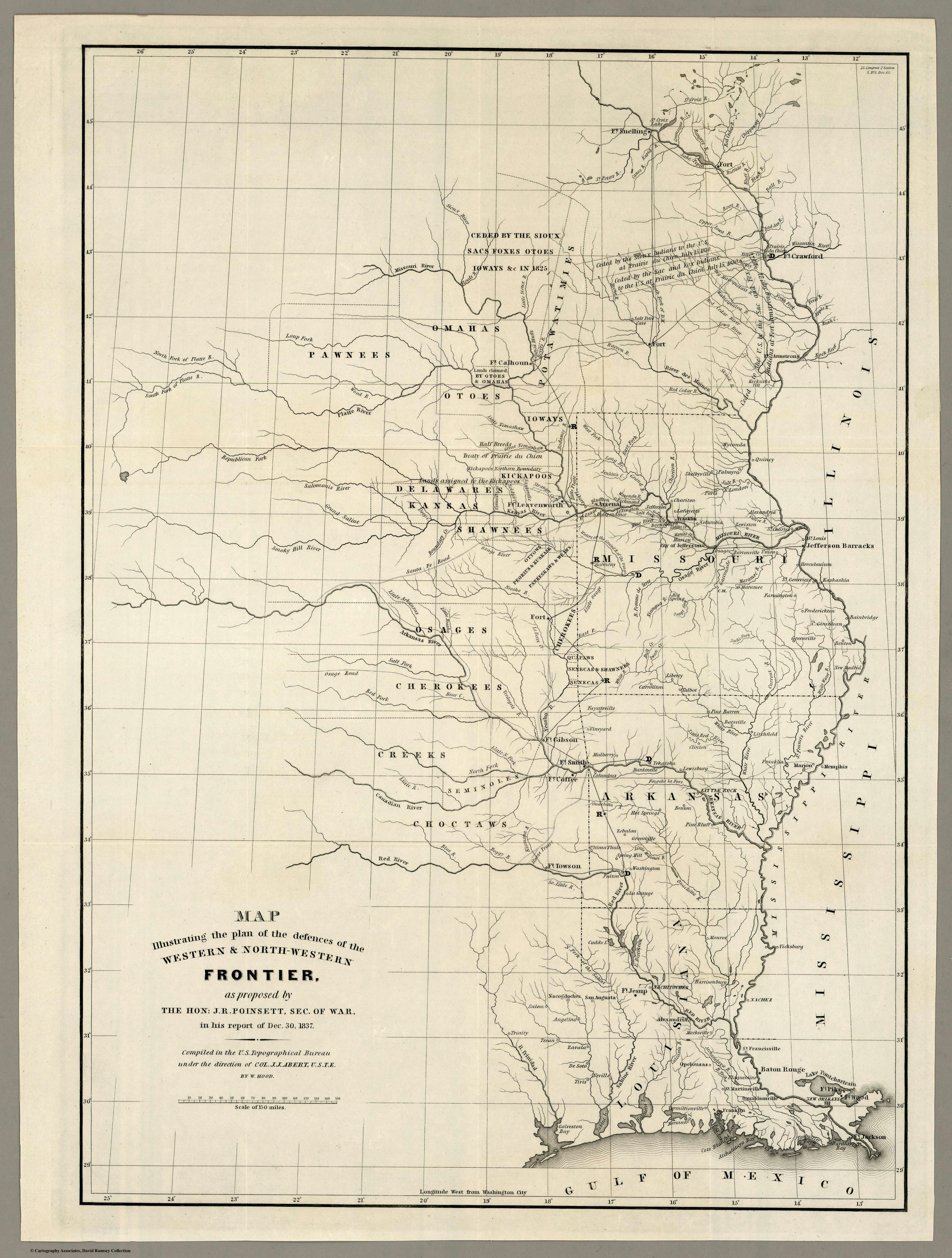
Map Illustrating the Plan of the Defenses of the Western & North-Western Frontier (1837)

Jim Boy and his household were deported as part of what historians call Detachment 6, and "after their tour of duty was over the warriors" joined their families at the Gulf Coast. USMC Lt. John George Reynolds wrote in 1837 to the effect that "losses sustained by the wealthy Creek families in east Alabama were great and proposes giving each family an average of fifty dollars in compensation and allow the headmen to distribute the funds proportionally" with "nearly all of Jim Boy's immediate people" considered wealthy.

Jim Boy stated that he allied with the U.S. Army "under a promise made by the commanding general, that in the removal of his people west of the Mississippi, about to take place, his property and family should be attended to, and that he should be indemnified for any loss that might happen in consequence of his absence. These stipulations, he alleges, were broken by the removal of his women and children, while he was absent in the service of the government, whereby his entire property was destroyed. Nor was this the worst of his misfortunes. His family, consisting of a wife and nine children, were among the unfortunate persons who were on board of the steamboat Monmouth, when that vessel was sunk by the mismanagement of those to whose care it was entrusted, and 236 of the Creeks, including four of his children, were drowned." In addition to Jim Boy's four children, three people he enslaved were killed in the nighttime boat collision. The steamboat Monmouth disaster took place on October 31, 1837, near Baton Rouge; the bodies of the dead were buried at Port Allen, Louisiana.

After Indian Removal, Jim Boy, his wife Nihethoye, and their surviving children lived at Creek Nation West, near what is now Wetumka, Oklahoma. Jim Boy died in Indian Territory in 1851.

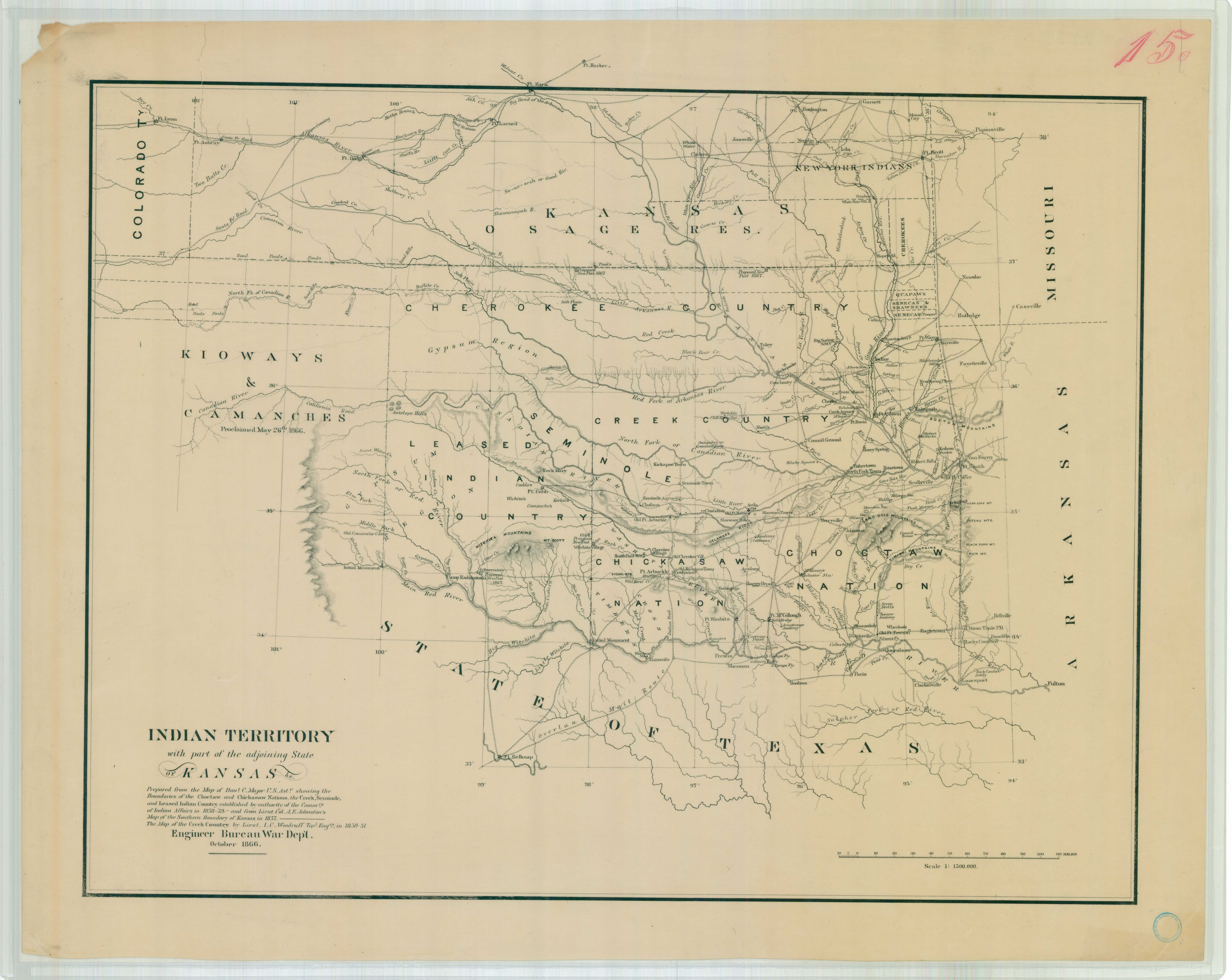
1866 map of Indian Territory, showing the Creek Nation at that time, including location of Fort Gibson (NAID 139308988)

== Family and legacy ==
Jim Boy had a half-brother named George Goodwin who was married to Anny Low. Anny Low was the daughter of Alexander Cornells' wife Big Woman, by her first husband, Tom Low.

His grandson Rev. William Jim Boy was "a well-known Methodist minister in the Creek nation." His wife was the aunt of Colonel William Robison, who was a Creek elder in the 1890s.

Halbert and Ball recorded in their 1895 history of the Creek War that Dr. A. B. Clanton of Leaf, Mississippi, knew him as Tuskegee, and reported: "'In his person he was the beau ideal of a hero' and 'beyond all comparison the finest looking man' that he had chanced to see." According to the Alabama Historical Quarterly in 1951, "Jim Boy is described as a remarkably handsome man, full six feet high, perfectly formed and with a commanding air. The late Rev. John Brown of Daleville, Mississippi, who served in the Seminole War, states that on one occasion, at General Jessup's headquarters, he saw Jim Boy, clad in his full war dress, engaged in conversation with the general; that he was struck with Jim Boy's appearance, and with the fact that he was by far a finer looking man than General Jessup."

A lithograph of Jim Boy, from a portrait probably painted by Charles Bird King, is plate 6 in volume 11 of Thomas McKenney and James Hall's History of the Indian Tribes of North America. The Smithsonian American Art Museum dates the portrait to about 1836.

== See also ==
- Homathlemico – Muscogee chief, hanged 1818
- Efau Haujo – 18th-century Muscogee chief
- Alexander Cornells – Creek interpreter (d. 1816)
- Oche Finceco – Mixed-Creek Nation tribal chief, often documented in lithographs

== Sources ==
- Braund, Kathryn E. Holland (November 1991). "The Creek Indians, Blacks, and Slavery". The Journal of Southern History. 57 (4). Baton Rouge, Louisiana: The Southern Historical Association: 601–636. doi:10.2307/2210598. ISSN 0022-4642. LCCN 36035310. OCLC 1782314.
- ——— (August 8, 2017). The African American Experience and the Creek War, 1813–14: An Annotated Bibliography (PDF) (Report). Horseshoe Bend National Military Park & Auburn University. npshistory.com. Cooperative Agreement Number P13AC00443.
- Halbert, Henry S.; Ball, T. H. (1895). The Creek War of 1813 and 1814. Chicago: Donohue & Henneberry. LCCN 02016796. OCLC 588549.
- Haveman, Christopher D. (August 7, 2009). The Removal of the Creek Indians from the Southeast, 1825–1838 (Ph.D thesis). Auburn, Alabama: Auburn University.
- Haveman, Christopher D. (2016). Rivers of Sand: Creek Indian Emigration, Relocation, and Ethnic Cleansing in the American South. Indians of the Southeast. Lincoln: University of Nebraska Press. ISBN 978-0-8032-8490-6. LCCN 2015008315. OCLC 933515729. Project MUSE book 43900.
- ———, ed. (2018). Bending their way onward: Creek Indian removal in documents. Lincoln: University of Nebraska Press. doi:10.2307/j.ctt1zk0n24. ISBN 978-0-8032-9698-5. JSTOR j.ctt1zk0n24. LCCN 2017036836. OCLC 1018379931. Project MUSE book 57372.
- Lawres, Nathan R. (2012). 'You Have Guns and So Have We...': An Ethnohistoric Analysis of Creek and Seminole Combat Behaviors (M.A. Anthropology). Orlando: University of Central Florida. 2145.
- Nuñez, Theron A. Jr. (1958c). "Creek Nativism and the Creek War of 1813–1814. Part 3 (Stiggins Narrative, Concluded)". Ethnohistory. 5 (3). Duke University Press: 292–301. doi:10.2307/480669. ISSN 1527-5477. LCCN 57043343. OCLC 1446170208.
- Owen, Thomas M. (1951). "Alabama Indian Chiefs". Alabama Historical Quarterly. 13: 5–91. ISSN 2769-8769. LCCN 36014637. OCLC 1478931.
- Stanley, John Mix (December 1852). Portraits of North American Indians, with sketches of scenery, etc., painted. Washington, D.C.: Smithsonian Institution. doi:10.5962/bhl.title.19033. LCCN 16005443. OCLC 3743801. OL 7904770W.
- Waselkov, Gregory A. (2006). A Conquering Spirit: Fort Mims and the Redstick War of 1813–1814. Tuscaloosa: University of Alabama Press. ISBN 978-0-8173-1491-0. LCCN 2006003877. OCLC 64098370.
- Watson, Samuel J. (2012). Jackson's Sword: The Army Officer Corps on the American Frontier, 1810–1821. Modern War Studies. Lawrence: University Press of Kansas. ISBN 978-0-7006-1884-2. LCCN 2012027879. OCLC 788282695.
- Woodward, Thomas Simpson (1939) [1859]. Woodward's reminiscences of the Creek, or Miscogee Indians, contained in letters to friends in Georgia and Alabama. Foreword by Peter Brannon (Reprint ed.). Tuscaloosa & Birmingham: Alabama book store, Birningham book exchange. LCCN 40000988. OCLC 1636426.
- Young, Mary (March 1990). "Creek Indian History: A Historical Narrative of the Genealogies, Traditions and Downfall of the Ispocoga or Creek Indian Tribe of Indians by One of the Tribe. By George Stiggins (1788–1845). Introduction and notes by William Stokes Wyman (1830–1915). Edited by Virginia Pounds Brown. Birmingham, Alabama: Birmingham Public Library Press, 1989. 176 pages. $24.95 Cloth" (PDF). Book Reviews. American Indian Culture and Research Journal. 14 (2). UCLA American Indian Studies Center: 137–139. ISSN 0161-6463. LCCN 78643481. OCLC 1781938.
