= Alexander Cornells =

Creek interpreter (d. 1816)

- Ocē Haco (Creek)
- Location of Cornells homestead in the vicinity of Fort Hull and Fort Decatur in the territory of the Upper Creeks in the 1810s; located approximately 7 mi (11 km) south of present-day Tuskegee and about 42 mi (68 km) east of Montgomery

Alexander Cornells (d. c. 1816), also known as Oche Haujo and Hickory Hadjo (Creek: Ocē Haco), was a bicultural diplomat, interpreter, assistant Indian agent, cattle rancher, slave owner, and plantation owner who was involved in treaty negotiations between the Creek Confederacy and the United States government. Alexander Cornells (Note: His name is rendered as Cornells in published records of his correspondence as Indian agent, but he seems to have signed as Curnells in some cases; another variant spelling is Cornel or Cornell, with no S at the end.) was an interpreter for the Upper Creeks. In the 1800s and 1810s he was micco, or headman, of one of the Muscogee mother towns, Tukabatchee.

== Ancestry and homestead ==
In the telling of Thomas Woodward in 1859, he was originally from a place called Little Tallasee near Proctor's Island on the Coosa River, and his father was Mad Blue Bob Cornells, while his mother "was a Tallasse."

In the telling of Henry S. Halbert and T. H. Ball in 1895, "It is difficult to reach certainty in regard to the various white men who married Indian women and became heads of families noted in the Creek history. It seems, that some time in the 18th century, Joseph Cornells, a white man, married an Indian woman, but her name has not been found. On the authority of Brewer, the Cornells family is placed among those claiming descent from the noted Sehoy. Three sons of this Joseph are named, George Cornells, Alexander Cornells, and James Cornells, the latter having been usually called Jim Cornells. And the name is often found written Curnells, as it was probably thus pronounced; but Colonel Hawkins and Charles Weatherford write Cornells." The Cornells descendant tree, poorly documented, may include Big Warrior, William Weatherford, and Opothleyahola. According to Claudio Saunt, Cornels' brother Joseph Cornels worked as an interpreter for Alexander McGillivray. The 1813 battle of Burnt Corn Springs took place around James Cornells' house near the Federal Road through Creek lands where it intersected with "the Wolf Trail to Spanish Pensacola."

Cornells lived near Tukabatchee, one of the mother towns. He worked as an interpreter; in 1797 he was paid US$131 (equivalent to $2,453 in 2025) for three months service. According to Benjamin Hawkins, writing in 1799, Tukabatchee was located between the Tallapoosa River and what Hawkins called Calebehatche Creek (possibly Cubahatchee Creek, GNIS feature 151750). Hawkins described the vicinity: "in some places the swamp is wide, the beach and white oak large, with poplar, cypress, red bay, sassafras, Florida magnolia, and white pine...The creek at its mouth is 25 feet wide. The flat between it and the river is fine for corn, cotton, and melons, oak, hickory, and shortleaf pine. From this flat to its source, it is margined with cane, reed, and palmetto...the range on these creeks is apparently fine for cattle; yet from the want of salt or moss, the large ones appear poor in the fall, while other cattle, where moss is to be had, or they are regularly salted, are fat."

Hawkins reported in the same letter:

The assistant and interpreter, Mr. Cornells (Oche Haujo), one of the chiefs of the Creek Nation, has a farm well fenced and cultivated with the plough. He is a half-breed, of a strong mind, and fulfills the duties enjoined on him by his appointment, with zeal and fidelity. He has nine negroes under good government. Some of his family have good farms, and one of them, Zachariah McGive [Zach McGirt?] is a careful, snug farmer, has good fences, a fine young orchard, and a stock of hogs, horses, and cattle. His wife has the neatness and economy of a white woman. This family and Sullivan's, in the neighborhood, are spinning."

== Career and Creek War ==
Historians group Cornells with Charles Weatherford and White Lieutenant, as part of a clutch of "wealthy men who valued the power and order legitimated by the social compact, became active in its enforcement in the wake of Alexander McGillivray's death." His enslaved Black workforce and his cattle herds made him rich; his dependence of slaves limited his dependence on young and hungry men from the Creek Confederacy, increasing intratribal class stratification. Their wealth came from "mercantile enterprises" and in many cases from stock raising; "Some Creeks and Seminoles had very large herds by the early 1800s. Herds of 1,000 to 2,000 cattle were recorded among some Lower Creek and Seminole towns, and herds of several hundred were not uncommon in the late 1700s and early 1800s." By the time of his death around 1816, Cornells, his brother David Cornells, Alexander McGillivray, Jack Kinnard, 'the Bully,' William McIntosh, the Perrymans, Menawa, and the Barnards, "constituted the core of an emergent bourgeoisie which would challenge and ultimately transform the traditional sociopolitical order among this group."

In 1803 he hosted the surveyors sent to lay out the Federal Road through Creek lands at a stop he called "Point Comfort," and told his guests of his belief that the "facility of intercourse which such a road would occasion would be highly beneficial to the red people as well as to the white." Cornells' letters to Benjamin Hawkins are an important primary source on the politics of the Creek Nation in the years prior to the Redsticks War, for instance his report in April 1813 that dissident Little Warrior had been slated for execution by a party led by William McIntosh but had initially escaped and was later flushed out of a wetland near the Coosa River and there killed. Around the same time he advised that the Red Sticks believed "the white people [...] could do them no injury, if they came among them, as the prophets would draw circles around their abode, and render the earth quaggy and impassable." Per military historian Tom Kanon, "Cornells's account indicates just how deeply the Red Sticks movement became steeped in spiritual overtones."

In June 1813 he condemned the Tecumseh-led Prophets movement, writing Hawkins that the claimed revelations were "fooleries," and that "other Creek leaders dismissed them as 'a sort of madness, and amusement for idle people.'" He reported that "Redsticks destroyed forges, spinning wheels, and cattle, leading their enemies to describe the two warring sides in terms of 'civilization' and 'tradition.' 'The Prophets are enemies to the plan of civilization and advocates for the wild Indian mode of living,' claimed Alexander Cornels, the wealthy mestizo on the payroll of the U.S. government. But like 'American' and 'communist' in the 1950s, Cornels' terms exalted one side and disparaged the other without actually describing the difference between them." Modern scholarship suggest there was something like a class war afoot in the Creek nation, with the less prosperous Red Sticks intending to destroy the core villages of Tuckabatche and Coweta "with every person in them, then kill Mr. Cornells the interpreter, Tustunugee Thlucco, Col. Hawkins, and all the old chiefs who had taken his talks.' [...] After these murders, Cornels reported, the Redsticks 'would be ready for white people.'"

Later that summer Sam Moniac swore an affidavit in August 1813 that Jim Boy ("High-Head Jim") had told him that, "the war was to be against the whites and not between Indians themselves—that all they wanted was to kill those who had taken the talk of the whites, viz.: the Big Warrior, Alex. Cornells, Capt. Isaac, Wm. McIntosh, the Mad Dragon's son, the little Prince Spoko Kange, and Tallasee Thicksico." Henry S. Halbert and T. H. Ball commented on this testimony in their 1895 history of the Creek War, "This deposition, although sworn to by as friendly and trusty a man as Sam Moniac, must not all be taken as reliable history."

Cornells was to be granted a square mile of land under the 1814 Treaty of Fort Jackson; the language read: "4th, and lastly. We give and grant to Alexander Cornells a half breed, and old and faithful interpreter, who, has been long in the public service, one mile square of land, at his option, to be located by him." Andrew Jackson and Benjamin Hawkins were awarded similar grants at the same time. The 14th United States Congress refused to approve these land grants to individuals. Jackson biographer James Parton wrote in 1860, "There is no nation, I presume, civilized or barbarous, that would permit men sent to negotiate a treaty to receive important benefits from the nation to which they were accredited. The thing is utterly and universally inadmissible. It would be opening the door to the worst corruption, and offering a reward to treason."

When he died, Benjamin Hawkins mourned him, writing, "We have not his equal among us."

== Personal life ==
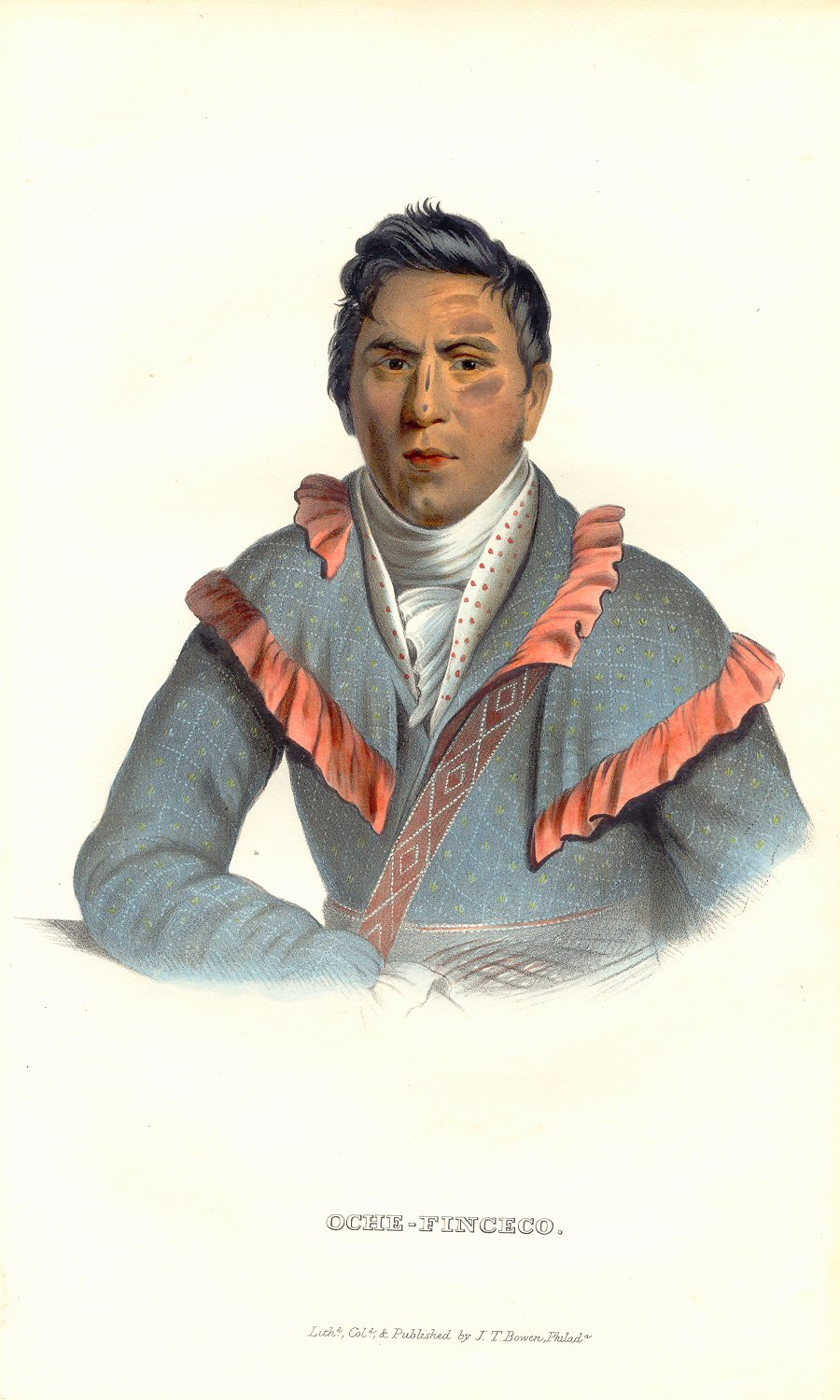
Oche-Finceco, lithograph after a portrait by Charles Bird King, as depicted in History of the Indian Tribes of North America

His wife was a daughter of Efau Haujo of Tuckabatchee, "Great Medal Chief." Cornells was married to Big Woman, "the daughter of the old Mad-Dog by the mother of Tuskenea." Their children were Sukey Cornells (who married her second cousin, Dick Cornells), and Charles Cornells (Oche Finceco) (who married Peggy McGillivray, a daughter of Alexander McGillivray, and who hanged himself around 1828).

Cornells' family was emblematic of shifting social norms in the Muskogee community: "Cornels readily adopted the model of the patriarchal, nuclear family, taking agricultural production out of the hands of his wife and daughters and using slaves in their place. The women in his wife's lineage protested, however, demanding that Cornels's daughters receive payment for learning how to spin cotton. Five or six of his wife's relatives also expected Cornels to feed them. Cornels objected under the belief that he was responsible solely for his own immediate family. From the perspective of these women, however, Cornels had married into their clan and lived in their household. Cornels's wife and her female relatives refused to abide by the precepts of patriarchy."

== See also ==
- Andrew Jackson and land speculation § Treaty side deals

== Sources ==
- Braund, Kathryn E. Holland (November 1991). "The Creek Indians, Blacks, and Slavery". The Journal of Southern History. 57 (4): 601–636. doi:10.2307/2210598. JSTOR 2210598.
- Ethridge, Robbie Franklyn (2003). Creek country: the Creek Indians and their world. Chapel Hill: University of North Carolina Press. ISBN 978-0-8078-2827-4. LCCN 2003011479. OCLC 52312190.
- Christopher, Raven M.; Waselkov, Gregory (April 2012). Archaeological Survey of the Old Federal Road in Alabama. Mobile, Alabama: Center for Archaeological Studies, University of South Alabama.
- Halbert, Henry S.; Ball, T. H. (1895). The Creek War of 1813 and 1814. Chicago, Ill., Montgomery, Ala.: Donohue & Henneberry; White, Woodruff, & Fowler.
- Kanon, Tom (2014). Tennesseans at War, 1812–1815: Andrew Jackson, the Creek War, and the Battle of New Orleans. Tuscaloosa: University of Alabama Press. ISBN 9780817318291. LCCN 2013049815. OCLC 900093586. Project MUSE book 30812.
- Sattler, Richard A. (June 1998). "Cowboys and Indians: Creek and Seminole Stock Raising, 1700–1900". American Indian Culture and Research Journal. 22 (3): 79–99. doi:10.17953/aicr.22.3.a3137743567026p2 (inactive September 7, 2026). ISSN 0161-6463.
- Saunt, Claudio (1999). A New Order of Things: Property, Power, and the Transformation of the Creek Indians, 1733–1816. Cambridge University Press. doi:10.1017/CBO9780511511554. ISBN 978-0-521-66943-6.
- Swanton, John Reed (1921). Early history of the Creek Indians and their neighbors. Bulletin of the Bureau of American Ethnology 73. Smithsonian Institution. Washington, D.C.: U.S. Government Printing Office. hdl:10088/15540. ISSN 0082-8882. LCCN 06006657. OCLC 562162326. OL 7677856W. 67th Congress, 1st Session, no. 97 (67-1:H.DOC.97; Serial Set 7938). – Other digital editions: govinfo.gov – Biodiversity Heritage Library – HathiTrust – Wikimedia
- Woodward, Thomas Simpson (1939) [1859]. Woodward's reminiscences of the Creek, or Miscogee Indians, contained in letters to friends in Georgia and Alabama. Foreword by Peter Brannon (Reprint ed.). Tuscaloosa & Birmingham: Alabama book store, Birningham book exchange. LCCN 40000988. OCLC 1636426.
