= Paddy Carr (Muscogee) =

Muscogee interpreter and businessman (c. 1807–aft. 1847)

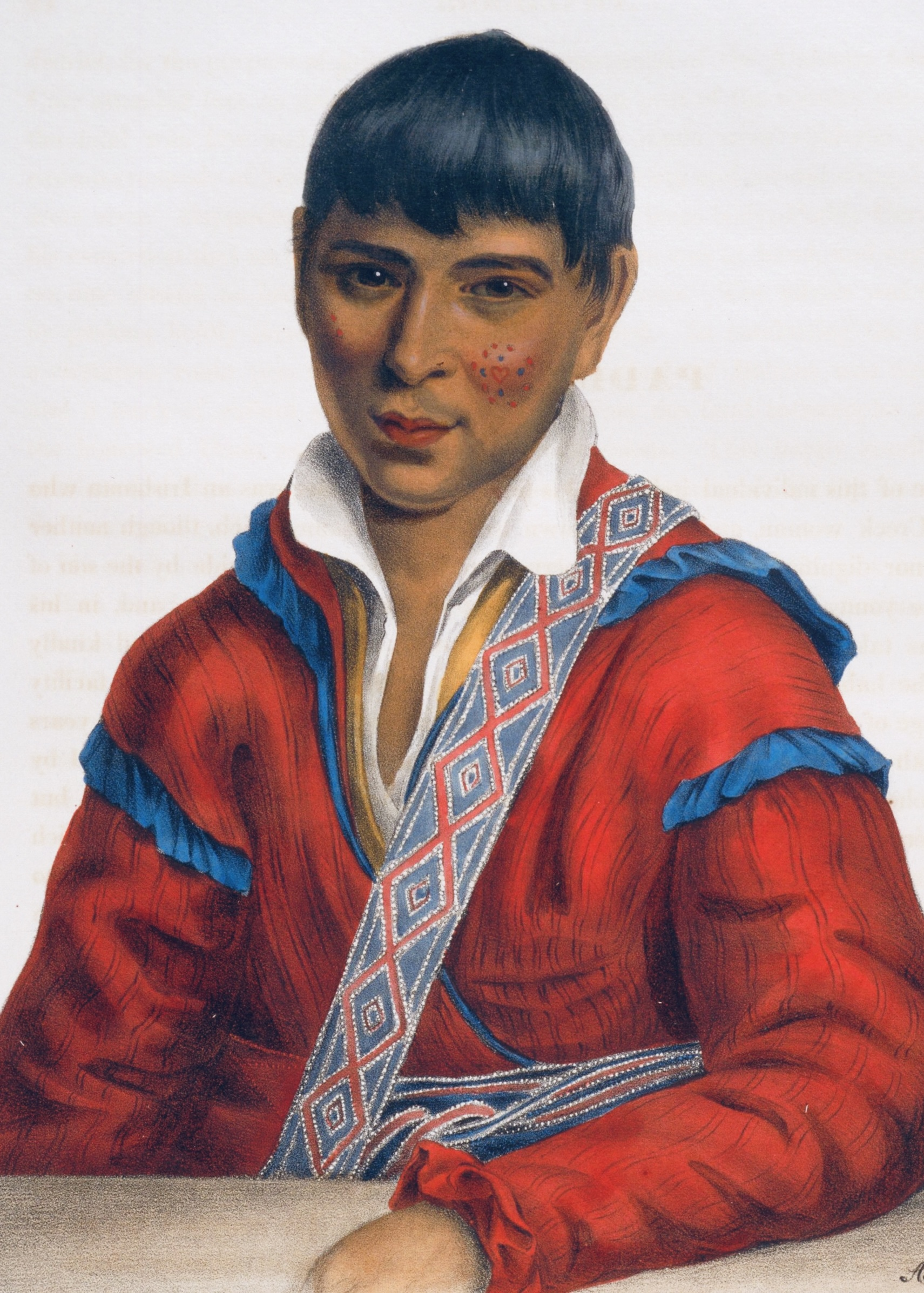
- Paddy Carr, Creek interpreter, printing by McKenney & Hall based on a portrait by Charles Bird King
- Born: March 1807; Near Fort Mitchell, Alabama
- Died: after 1847
- Citizenship: Muscogee Confederacy

Paddy Carr (March 1807–after 1847) was a Muscogee interpreter and diplomat, military officer and scout, slave owner, plantation owner, and real estate investor. Carr was mixed race and a fluent Muskogee-speaker, who lived in Alabama in the southeastern United States in the early 19th century. He was considered an "acculturated, accommodationist" Muscogee leader and a controversial figure.

In the 1820s, he served as an interpreter for the Muscogee at treaty negotiations with the U.S. government. Carr was also a wealthy planter who used labor from enslaved people to grow crops and had a marked interest in horses and horse trading. In the 1830s, he worked as a guide assisting U.S. Army officers, and as officer commanding Native fighters (on the side of the U.S. government) during the Second Creek and Second Seminole Wars. Before the pre-Removal treaties that granted land allotments to the tribe, he "worked with the land speculators to defraud less sophisticated Indians." He migrated from Alabama to the west in 1847, but reportedly returned to Alabama at an unknown date.

== Early life ==
Paddy Carr was born in March 1807 as the biological son of a Muscogee woman from Cusseta town and an Irish man, one of many "marriages and cohabitations between white men and Indian women [which] were common in areas of English settlement...and, even earlier, in areas of French settlement." He was raised by the Indian agent at Fort Mitchell, John Crowell. Growing up in Crowell's household he learned "how to gain wealth by farming Creek tribal lands, free of charge, with slave labor. He also learned how to gain access to Creek annuity payments, as every year he saw John Crowell and his brother, Tom Crowell, who operated a store near the agency, put the Creeks in debt and then take off a healthy cut of the government money as their compensation." Crowell also operated a racetrack at Coweta town, where plantation owners like James Jackson raced their thoroughbreds. Carr's allegiance, in adulthood at least, was to Coweta.

Carr was "handsome, well-built, and dark-skinned, with a face tattooed in ancient Creek fashion." As described by a U.S. Army surgeon, he was "very intelligent in conversation, and has no doubt received a good education. He speaks our language with fluency, is correct in his deportment, and rather polished in his manners." His bilingual fluency allowed him to conduct business in both English and Muskogee, "the lingua franca within the sprawling Creek Confederacy, which included non-Creek tribes."

== Diplomacy ==
He was an interpreter for the Creek delegation, led by Opothleyahola, in Washington, D.C. in 1826. According to one study of language in Alabama, "protocol sometimes demanded the presence of an interpreter, even when Indians knew English or French, as the case may be, so that Indians would not dishonor themselves by being forced to speak a different language when acting in an official capacity to represent the tribe." Carr was one of several bicultural Creeks who translated colonial languages (English, French, Spanish), into Muskogee and back again, some others of note being William Hambly, Galphin, Alexander Mayfield, George Lovett, Juan Antonio Sandoval, Juan Garzón, and Sam Moniac. In 1827, Carr interpreted for the elderly chief Little Prince in conversation with U.S. Army lieutenant John R. Vinton, who had been dispatched to Georgia by U.S. President John Quincy Adams to represent the federal government's defense of a strip of land in far western Georgia that the governor, George M. Troup, argued had already been ceded by Indigenous residents, which was not the position of the United States.

== Land speculation ==
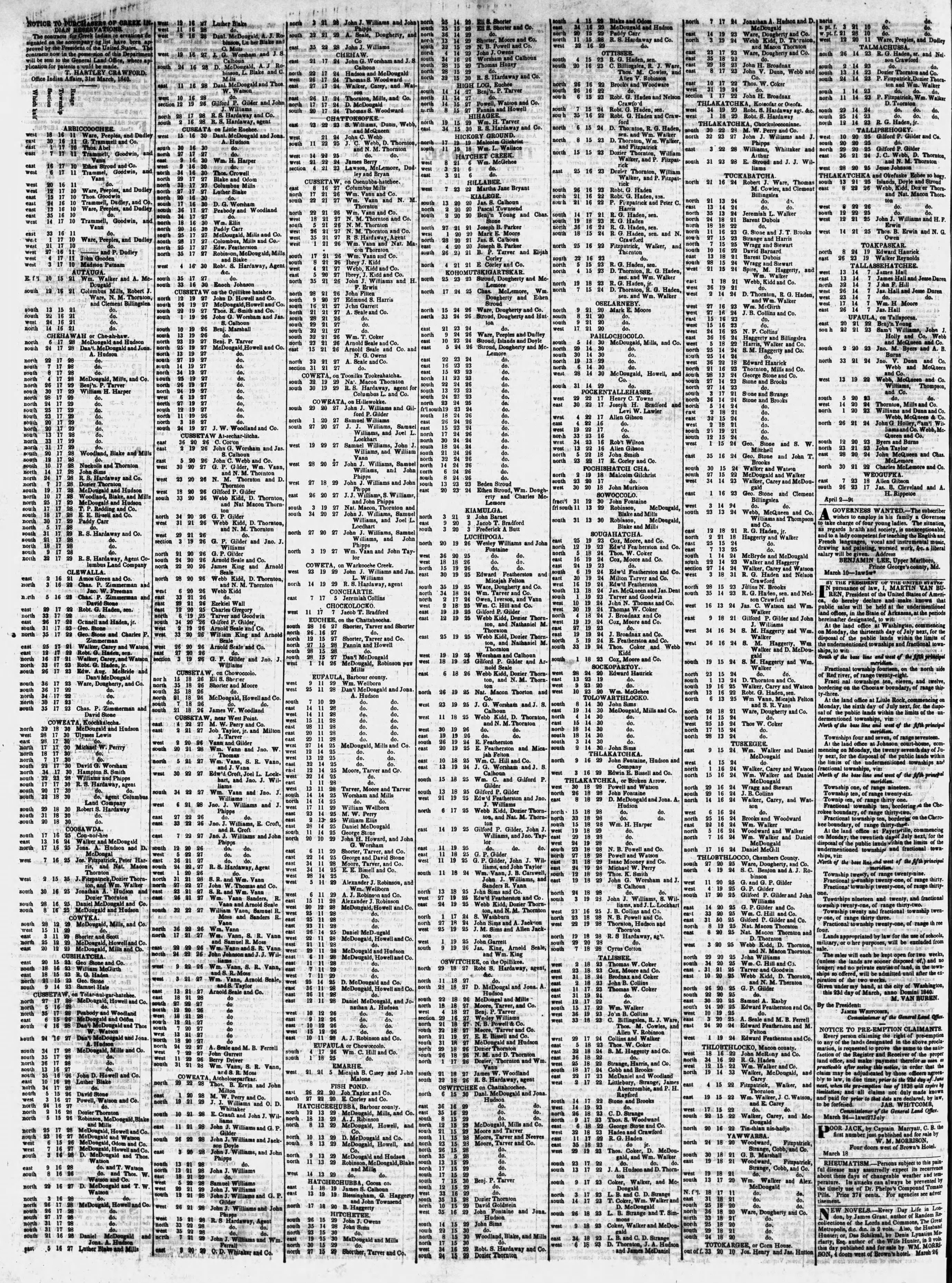
Paddy Carr and Malcolm Gilchrist were among those who purchased land reserves from Muscogee people who were going to be deported from Alabama if they did not emigrate voluntarily ("Notice to Purchasers of Creek Indian Reservations" Washington Union, April 9, 1840)

In the 1830s, Carr was a leader of the "McIntosh faction" in Alabama along with other surviving allies of Creek leader William McIntosh, including Benjamin Marshall, Joseph Marshall, and James Islands. According to historian John T. Ellisor, this group "represented a number of bicultural Creeks who remained in Alabama" when others had already migrated to the shortgrass prairies of Arkansas Territory and Indian Territory "either because they loved [the region] or, more likely, because they had substantial cattle herds and other property that they could not transport easily or afford to leave." In 1833 he was one of the "acculturated" planters among the Lower Creeks who received "considerable portions" of the Creek debt fund.

In 1836, "Working through their Creek interpreter, Paddy Carr—a shareholder in the Columbus Land Company—as well as a group of 'smart and active' Creek blacks, the speculators bribed, intimidated, and intoxicated the assembled Indians to get them to deny the existence of any land frauds" to the government investigator. John Hogan, the government agent responsible for investigating land fraud perpetrated on the Creeks discovered that Carr served as "interpreter and agent provocateur" for a group of land speculators (Daniel McDougald, Luther Blake, Dr. Columbus Mills, Capt. William Walker, and others) who had assembled at Watoolahawka (Neah Micco's town) for a "secret council with Neah Micco, Efau Emathla, Tuskenea, and other antiremoval chiefs...to put in place a scheme that would satisfy all present." With help from Georgian real-estate investors who had it out for the competing Alabamian real-estate investors, Hogan found that "The speculators had stolen about three-fourths of the Lower Creek land. The members of the Euchee town lost virtually all of their property to theft, as did the Creeks of Cusseta town. Hogan also uncovered a number of ingenious schemes the speculators used to get the Indians' land. At Cusseta, Paddy Carr bought the land of his tribespeople, then took back all the purchase money with a false promise. He told his fellow Creeks that he would use the money to send a delegation to Washington to get the president to reverse all the land sales and return all the allotments to the Creek Nation." He also worked as a purchaser for the land speculators Perry & Company, "whose underhanded tactics and success in stealing Creek reserves created resentment." Hogan's determination was that Carr was "as great a rogue as any in the nation." According to historian Christopher D. Haveman, "Neah Emathla, a prominent Hitchiti headman...claimed that Carr had personally stolen his reserve."

== Second Creek War ==
Carr worked with Thomas Sidney Jesup as an interpreter and guide during the Second Creek War in the 1830s. Property belonging to Carr and his foster father, Col. Crowell, was targeted during the conflict. Rebel Creeks "destroyed the plantation of Paddy Carr, the Creek who associated almost exclusively with whites and gave such valuable assistance to the land speculators. At night the inhabitants of Columbus could look across the river and see the fires burning. The rebels also took the slaves from the plantations they demolished. Paddy Carr alone lost seventy blacks." Carr joined with U.S. Army general Winfield Scott against the rebels, during which time, "He and his men wore buckskin leggings, calico hunting shirts, and scarlet turbans with strips of white cloth tied around the center" to mark them as a unified group of "friendlies."

Based on a far-fetched and unproven theory promulgated by Hogan, "Both Governor Clay and General Jesup suspected Judge Shorter and Paddy Carr of instigating the Creek war, and even those citizens who doubted Hogan's full account still blamed the speculators for causing the war and sought to censure them."

== Second Seminole War ==
Carr was one of the 776 Creeks recruited by the U.S. government to fight for them during the Second Seminole War in Florida. He served "under Captain John F. Lane. Of his service in Florida it was noted that he 'fought well—He has generally headed the scouting parties, and has performed those laborious and dangerous duties with great promptitude and cheerfulness.'"

When he returned from service in November 1837, he discovered "'no indians Left in The old Creek Nation'" but planned to remain in Russell County until he settled his business.

== Emigration ==
Carr left Russell County, Alabama, for the Indian Territory in February 1847, a decade later than most deported Creeks, leading a group "which included 11 Indians and eight blacks." According to 20th-century historian Grant Foreman, "He did not remain in the West but returned to Alabama."

== Legacy and family ==
In 2010, Ellisor described Carr as a representative figure of a troubled time:

Carr associated mainly with whites, made himself the centerpiece of their balls and parties, sought after profit, and, of course, worked closely with the Columbus gang to take advantage of Creek land allotees. Carr could also be haughty and proud and quick to defend his honor. He possessed a violent streak and was indicted at least once for the murder of another Indian, but apparently never convicted. Letters sent to the War Department, supposedly written by Carr, say that he favored removal as the salvation of the Creeks, and he undoubtedly believed, like the other McIntosh party members and the acculturated Cowetas in general, that the Creeks must educate themselves and utilize the market system to survive...In the end, Carr, and others like him, represented, in sociological terms, 'points of weakness' in Native society, for by mortgaging themselves and their land to the colonizers and the economic system, they became the keys, not to a meaningful acculturation of Natives, but to a loss of tribal integrity and independence. Perhaps more than any other single individual, Paddy Carr's actions, indeed his very being, revealed the tangled and destructive nature of interethnic conflict and collusion in New Alabama.

Carr's portrait is plate 5 in volume 9 (P27746) of McKenney and Hall's History of the Indian Tribes of North America, based on a painting made around 1825. Shortly after the treaty negotiations in 1826, he "married the daughter of Colonel Lovett, a respectable half breed, with whom he received a portion which, with the property accumulated by himself, furnished a capital sufficient to enable him to go into trade. In a few years he amassed a considerable property, and is now, in 1837, possessed of from seventy to eighty slaves, besides landed property, and a large stock of horses and cattle."

He had three wives, one of whom was Jane Hawkins, kin to Benjamin Hawkins (an influential Indian agent) and a daughter of William McIntosh (an important Creek leader who was sentenced to death in 1825 by fellow Creeks for his role in land cessions). Jane Hawkins Carr eventually granted herself a de facto divorce and "moved to the Indian Territory in the late 1820s or early 1830s. Jane Carr self-emigrated and paid for the transportation and rations of 49 members of her family."

Carr had twin daughters Ariadon and Areanne. He had a brother called Tom Carr.

== Sources ==
- The Indian Tribes of North America No. 9. Philadelphia: F. W. Greenough. 1838. NMAI.AC.115_ref9 – via Smithsonian Institution.
- Bonner, James C. (March 1960). "Journal of a Mission to Georgia in 1827". The Georgia Historical Quarterly. 44 (1): 74–85. ISSN 0016-8297. JSTOR 40578004.
- Ellisor, John T. (2010). The Second Creek War: Interethnic Conflict and Collusion on a Collapsing Frontier. Indians of the Southeast. Lincoln, Nebraska: University of Nebraska Press. ISBN 978-0-8032-2548-0. LCCN 2010009967. OCLC 701719679. Project MUSE book 1494.
- Foreman, Grant (1985) [1934]. Five Civilized Tribes. Civilization of the American Indian Series (Reprint ed.). Norman: University of Oklahoma Press. ISBN 978-0-8061-7266-8. LCCN 34038511. OCLC 44962633. OL 1223881W.
- Haveman, Christopher D. (2016). Rivers of sand: Creek Indian emigration, relocation, and ethnic cleansing in the American South. Indians of the Southeast. Lincoln: University of Nebraska Press. ISBN 978-0-8032-8490-6. LCCN 2015008315. OCLC 933515729. Project MUSE book 43900.
- ——— (2017). "The Indomitable Women of the Creek Removal Era". In Ashmore, Susan Youngblood; Dorr, Lisa Lindquist (eds.). Alabama Women: Their Lives and Times. University of Georgia Press. pp. 24–53. doi:10.1353/book52089. ISBN 978-0-8203-5077-6. LCCN 2016051435. OCLC 988028967.
- ———, ed. (2018). Bending their way onward: Creek Indian removal in documents. Lincoln: University of Nebraska Press. doi:10.2307/j.ctt1zk0n24. ISBN 978-0-8032-9698-5. JSTOR j.ctt1zk0n24. LCCN 2017036836. OCLC 1018379931. Project MUSE book 57372.
- Picone, Michael D. (2018). "2. Multilingual Alabama". In Nunnally, Thomas (ed.). Speaking of Alabama: the history, diversity, function, and change of language. Tuscaloosa: The University of Alabama Press. pp. 18–49. ISBN 978-0-8173-1993-9. LCCN 2018005493. OCLC 1077769981. Project MUSE book 63153.
