= Chekilli =

Chekilli (flourished 18th-century) was a Native American chief from the Creek people. He negotiated peace with the British in 1733 upon the founding of Savannah, Georgia by the British. He did this alongside another chief, Tomochichi. Chekilli might have visited England in 1734. When the Creeks visited the British in Savannah, in 1735, Chekilli presented the Creek origin myth. He gave the British a buffalo skin that had drawings of the cosmology. He lived in Coweta in 1753. The USS Chekilli was named after him.
