= Abihka =

Unknown city built by Indigenous peoples of North America

Abihka (Creek: Apehkv) was one of the four mother towns of the Muscogee Creek confederacy. Its precise location is presently unknown.

== History ==
=== Origins ===
The Abihka (Note: Also Abcha, Abeca, Abecaes, Abecka, Abeica, Abeika, Abeka, Abica, Abi'hka, Abihki, Abika, Abikaw.) were the remnants of the 16th century "Chiefdom of Coosa." The bulk of the Natchez people settled with the Abihka after being dispersed by the French in the 18th century.

By 1771, white traders had settled in the village with the indigenous peoples.

=== Etymology ===
The name "Abihka" (meaning unknown), is sometimes used to refer to all the Upper Creek peoples.

== Territory ==
The members of the Abihka were Upper Creek Indians. Their main place of residence was along the banks of the Upper Coosa and Alabama rivers, in what is now Talladega County, Alabama. Besides the town of Abihka, the Creek had established other important towns in their territory: Abihkutchi, Tuckabutche, Talladega, Coweta, and Kan-tcati. Selocta Chinnabby was a famous member of the Abihka Clan.

The town of Abihka lay about 159 miles to the south of the Chickasaw territory.

== Ceremonial grounds ==
After the removal to the Indian Territory, refugees from the Abihka mother-town established a ceremonial stomp dance ground which they call Abihka (or sometimes, Arbeka). It is located near Henryetta, Oklahoma.

Alice Brown Davis and her husband, George Rollin Davis, operated a trading post, post office, general store and the Bar X Bar ranch in Arbeka until George's death. She succeeded him as postmistress in the 1890s. There is an Arbeka Road in the area.
