= Battle of Autossee =

Battle fought during the Creek War

- Part of the War of 1812, the Creek War
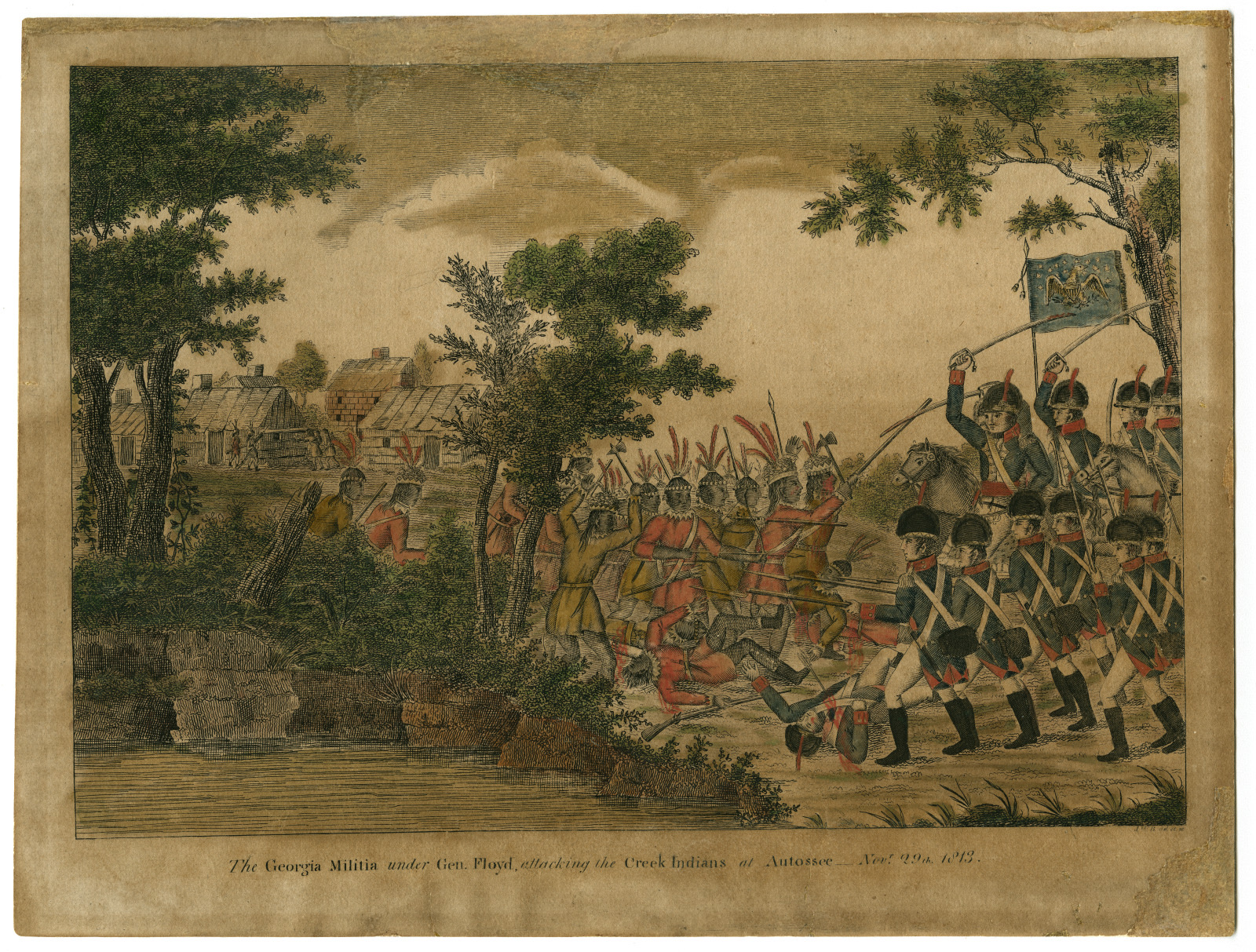
- "Georgia Militia under Gen. Floyd, attacking the Creek Indians at Autossee" (Historic New Orleans Collection MSS 557.9.166)
Date	November 29, 1813
Location	In present-day Macon County, Alabama 32.440°N 85.943°W
Result	American victory

Belligerents
United States	Red Stick Creeks

Commanders and leaders
John Floyd (WIA)	Unknown, Creek Kings †

Strength
1,350–1,400	1,500

Casualties and losses
Americans: 6–11 killed during battle, 5 wounded, 5 killed in ambush after battle - American allied Creek: unknown	200 killed, unknown wounded

The Battle of Autossee took place on November 29, 1813, during the Creek War, at the Creek towns of Autossee (Note: Autossee translates to "war club" in Muskogean) and Tallassee (Note: Tallassee translates to "apple grove" in Muskogean) near present-day Shorter, Alabama. General John Floyd, with 900 to 950 militiamen and 450 allied Creek, attacked and burned down both villages, killing 200 Red Sticks in the process.

== Background ==
The recent Fort Mims massacre had done nothing but validate Floyd's intentions to prepare for a larger offensive. He had raised a substantial company of militia in Georgia, and had made his way into the Mississippi Territory (in what is today central Alabama) in response to increased tensions between white settlers and Creek factions.

As Andrew Jackson, John Coffee and John Cocke made their way south from Tennessee with a force of 3,500 men, Floyd set out along the Federal Road for Autossee, a village of about 1,500 Creek (which included High Head Jim and others responsible for the massacre at Fort Mims). His company included 900 militiamen and 450 allied Creek, many from Tukabatchee, under the command of William McIntosh.

== The battle ==
Before sunrise, the Georgia militia split into two columns in an effort to surround the town. Three things, however, did not go as planned before the attack could commence. First, Floyd discovered a second, smaller Red Stick town, Tallassee, forcing him to order the company to spread out thinner than originally planned. Also, a western escape route could not be blocked by McIntosh (as ordered by Floyd) because he and his men could not cross the deep, freezing cold Tallapoosa River. They instead had settled for crossing Calebee Creek and blocking the northern routes. Lastly—but most critically—a Red Stick hunter had spotted them and warned the town, allowing the inhabitants time to both evacuate the women and children; and to send out runners to call for help from nearby settlements. (Note: The requested help never came.) Floyd's men had superior musketry and cannon that allowed them to quickly storm the village and set it ablaze. Although most of the Creek warriors fled, Floyd later reported that some stayed to fight to the end—dying in the fires.

== Aftermath ==
In three hours, 200 to 250 Red Sticks were killed. Most of the townspeople had escaped, however, due to the militia's thinly spread formation and the ill-placed allied Creek fighters. Floyd lost 11 of his men by comparison (and a small number of allied Creek), with five wounded—including himself. (Note: Floyd had been shot with a musket ball to the knee in the midst of battle.) Between the two towns, 400 houses were burned to the ground.

Now low on supplies, the militia headed back to Fort Mitchell. The Creek warrior, Paddy Walsh—late to help his fellow warriors at Autossee—harassed them along the way, and killed an additional five men. Upon their arrival at the fort, the militia regrouped for two months and prepared for another offensive that resulted in the Battle of Calebee Creek in late January 1814.

== Legacy ==
The site of Autossee now lies on private property in Macon County, Alabama, near the town of Shorter. The location is unmarked and inaccessible to the public.

== See also ==
- Homathlemico – Muscogee chief, hanged 1818
