= Efau Haujo =

18th-century Muscogee chief

Efau Haujo or Ifo Hadjo (Creek: Efv Haco), also known as Mad Dog, (1710–1812) was a "Great Medal Chief" of the Muscogee people of North America and "speaker for the nation at the national council." He was headman at the tribal town of Tuckabatchee in what is now Macon County, Alabama. As described by Indian agent Benjamin Hawkins in 1799, "He is one of the best informed men of the land, faithful to his national engagements. He has five black slaves and a stock of cattle and horses; but they are of little use to him; the ancient habits instilled in him by French and British agents, that the red chiefs are to live on presents from their white friends, is so rivited, that he claims it as a tribute due to him, and one that never must be dispensed with. At the public establishment there is a smith's shop, a dwelling house and kitchen built of logs, and a field well fenced."

Smithsonian ethnologist J. R. Swanton believed that the memoirs of Colonel George Hanger, published 1802, contained a description of an Indian who was likely Efau Haujo, apparently from when Hanger was stationed with the British Army in North America during the American Revolutionary War:

One of their Chiefs came to pay his respects to the Commanding Officer at Savannah. Reader, I think his triumphant entry and dress will at least make you smile. He was mounted on a small, mean Chickesaw horse, about twelve hands and an half high: his dress consisted of a linen shirt, a pair of blue cloth trowsers, with yellow and scarlet flaps sewed down the outward seams; over this he had an old full-dress uniform of the English foot-guards, the lace very much tarnished: a very large tye-wig on his head; an old gold-laced uniform hat, Cumberland-cocked; a large gorget round his neck; a sword, in a belt, hung over his shoulder; a tomahawk and scalping-knife in his girdle; rings in his nose and ears; his face, and breast, which was quite open, painted various colours; and a musket on his shoulder. He was one of the most distinguished Chiefs amongst the whole Indian nations, and was called the mad dog."

He signed the Coleraine Treaty of June 1796, and he also was speaker for the nation during treaty negotiations at Fort Wilkinson in 1802. Big Warrior married his "deserted wife." His daughter Big Woman, "the daughter of the old Mad-Dog by the mother of Tuskenea," married planter and Indian agent Alexander Cornells.

== See also ==
- Oche Finceco, his grandson
