= Little Prince (chief) =

Leader of Lower Creeks (1780s–1832)

Little Prince or Tastanaki Hopayi, Tustanagee Hopae (Tvstanagi Hopvyē in Mvskokē «Far Warrior» < ho·pv·yē «far») (died 1832) was an 18th-century chieftain and longtime representative of the Lower Creeks from the 1780s until his death in 1832. During the early 19th century, he and Big Warrior shared the leadership of the Creek National Council.

== Biography ==
Little Prince is first recorded in 1780 living as a chieftain at Broken Arrow. During the summer, he joined British Indian Agent John Tate who led a combined force of Upper and Lower Creeks to support Colonel Thomas Brown at Augusta, Georgia who was at the time defending the city against American forces.

After Tate died en route to the city, most of the Upper Creek with the exception of Tukabatchee chieftain Efa Tustenuggee returned to their villages while Little Prince and his 250 warriors continued on to Augusta. Arriving in time to take part in the Battle of Augusta, Little Prince led an attack to break the siege by Colonel Elijah Clarke suffering 70 casualties as a result.

Following the American retreat, a number of American prisoners were handed over to the Creek and tortured before their execution most notably the garrison commanding officers Brown and Grierson. How much control Little Prince had over his warriors at this point is disputed among historians however his ally Efa Tustenuggee was said by General Thomas S. Woodward to be "the most hostile and bitter enemy the white people ever had".

He was a later signatory of the Treaty of Colerain in 1796, thereafter a supporter of peaceful relations with the United States government, although he would take part in the Creek War in 1813. He and seven other chieftains were involved in the execution of Little Warrior during the spring of 1813, however he would retain his position of the lower Creek until his death in 1832.

Little Prince operated a tavern along the Federal Road in Creek Stand, Alabama.
