= George Mayfield =

American spy (1779–1848)

George Mayfield (1779−1848) was an interpreter and spy for General Andrew Jackson during the Creek War of 1813–1814. He is most notable for his dual existence between the white and Native American peoples of North America at a pivotal moment in the history of the United States.

== Early life and capture by the Creek ==
Mayfield's father, Southerland Mayfield, lived on a Washington District (modern-day Tennessee) homestead on the frontier between the United States and the Creek Indian nation. On March 10, 1789, the Mayfield farm was attacked by a party of 10−12 Creek. The attack left all of the males of the Mayfield family dead except for 10-year-old George and his younger brother, who were held captive by the Creek.

For the next 11 years, Mayfield lived among the Creek and became accustomed to their ways. He lost the ability to speak English and purportedly contracted a fondness for their mode of life.

== Reintroduction into American society ==
The attack at his father's homestead had left much of Mayfield's family dead, but his mother and sister had survived and resettled in Nashville. Although Mayfield lived contentedly among the Creek, he retained memories and affections for his mother and sister. In 1800, at the age of 21, Mayfield left his adopted people to search out his mother and sister.

Upon his return to the Anglo-American settlement, Mayfield found himself heir to an estate that had been left to him after the death of his father 11 years earlier. He ceded almost all of the property to his mother and sisters and kept only 80 acres (324,000 m^{2}) for himself.

== Creek War ==
The United States continued to grow, and the need for new lands was pushing colonists further west, creating pressure in the territory which had long past been settled and regularly hunted by the Creek peoples. The clash of cultures eventually resulted in the Creek War of 1813−1814. Leading James Madison's war effort was General Andrew Jackson, who parlayed his success in removing the Creek from their ancestral homes into two terms of his own presidency.

Owing to his unique knowledge of the Creek language and territory, Mayfield had been recommended to Jackson by the commanding general of the Tennessee troops. He proved to be a valuable asset to General Jackson. He performed as a guide, an interpreter, and a spy.

On March 27, 1814, Mayfield was wounded at the Battle of Horseshoe Bend.

== Later life ==
In the Treaty of Fort Jackson which ended the war, the Creek chiefs recognized not only Mayfield's bravery, but also his integrity in his dealings with them during negotiations. As a result, they stipulated that he be granted 1 square mile (2.6 km^{2}) of the land they forfeited. The U.S. government, however, refused to allow this, which forced Mayfield to petition Congress for the grant. Congress finally complied; however the grant was never enforced by the government.

Mayfield died in 1848.
