= Warriorstand, Alabama =

Unincorporated community in Alabama, United States

- Unincorporated community
- Location in Alabama Location in the United States
- Coordinates: 32°18′43″N 85°33′12″W
- Country: United States
- State: Alabama
- County: Macon
- Elevation: 489 ft (149 m)
- Time zone: UTC-6 (Central (CST))
  - Summer (DST): UTC-5 (CDT)
- Area code: 334
- GNIS feature ID: 128603

Warriorstand (also Warrior Stand) is an unincorporated community in Macon County, Alabama, United States.

== History ==
The lands of Macon County were occupied by Creek Indians prior to European-American settlement.

In 1805, the Old Federal Road was built across the Creek Nation, connecting Milledgeville, Georgia with Fort Stoddert, Mississippi Territory. The Creek were given authority by the United States to operate "houses of entertainment" along the route. A tavern was established at "Warrior Stand", a stagecoach stop owned by Big Warrior, a prominent Creek Chief. When Marquis de Lafayette visited the United States in 1824–1825, his party stayed one night at the tavern.

The community had a Methodist Episcopalian Church, as well as a Masonic Grand Lodge (#115).

== Demographics ==
Historical population
Census	Pop.	Note	%±
1880	145		—
1890	215		48.3%
U.S. Decennial Census

Warrior Stand was listed on the 1880 and 1890 U.S. Censuses. It did not appear on any others after.

== Today ==
The Warrior Stand Volunteer Fire Department has been recognized for its exceptional work providing rural fire safety education. The baseball diamond at the South Macon Recreation Center in Warrior Stand is used for local competitions.

== Notable people ==
- George Wylie Henderson, author.
- William D. Jelks, Governor of Alabama from 1901–1907.
