= Emperor Brim =

Emperor Brim, also known as Hoboyetly, (died 1733) was a Muscogee mico, or ruler, of Coweta who rose to power through a series of shifting alliances with France, England, and Spain.

His two sons, Hollata Brim and Seepeycoffee Brim, both later served as leading Cowetas, but it was Malatchi Brim, a maternal relation of Emperor Brim (perhaps a nephew), who succeeded him as mico in accordance with the Creek custom of matrilineality.

During the Yamasee War, Brim initially supported the Yamasee in their efforts against the British in general and white South Carolinians in particular. However, as circumstances changed, Brim ended up signing a treaty with the British. He also used the conflict to launch raids against the enemy Cherokees as well as Carolinians.
