= Steamboat Monmouth disaster =

300+ Muscogee killed, 1837

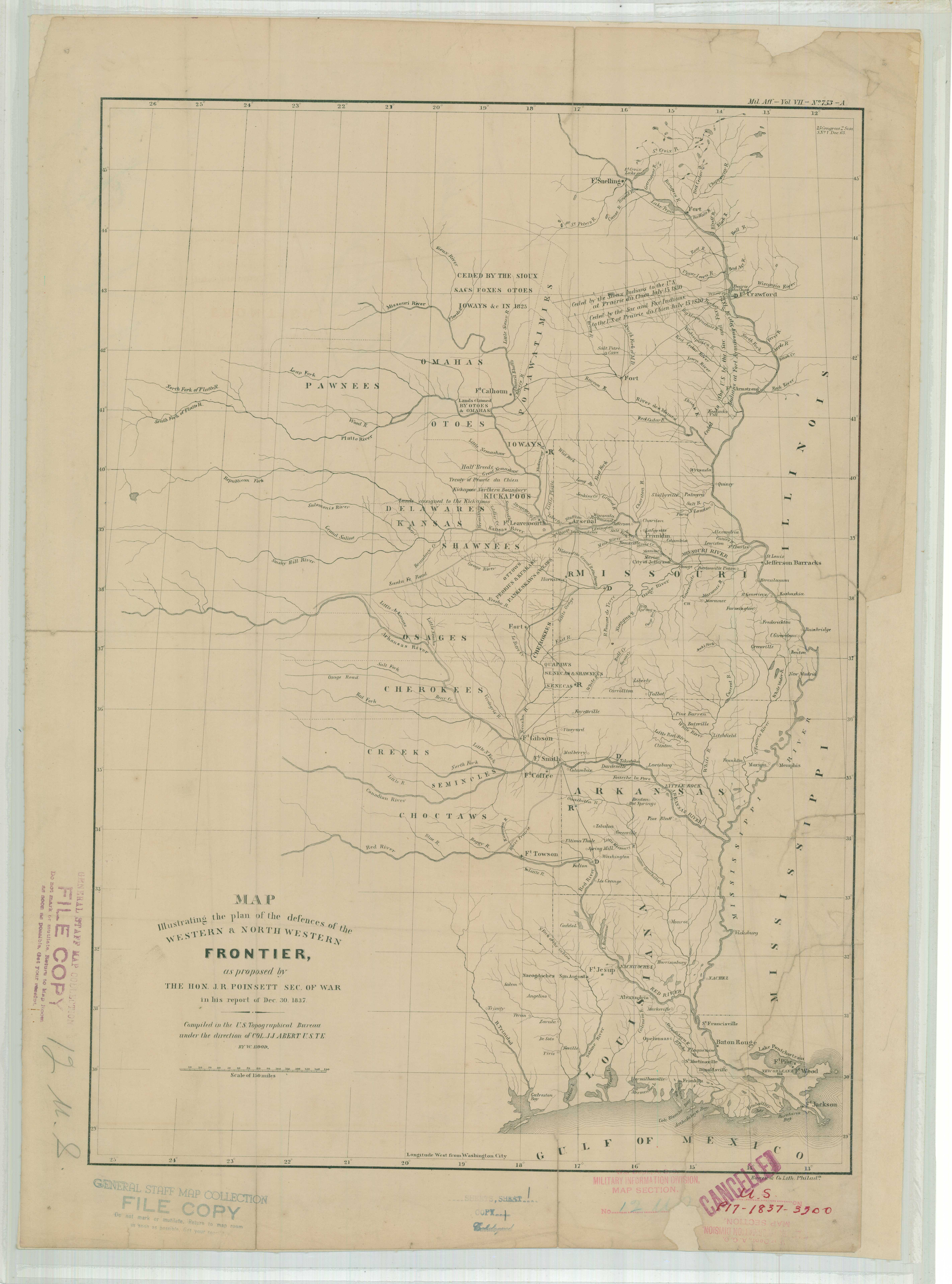
"Map Illustrating the Plan of the Defenses of the Western and Southwestern Frontier" published 1837, showing west Mississippi, Baton Rouge, and the Arkansas River and approximate indigenous territories at that time (NARA 77452208)

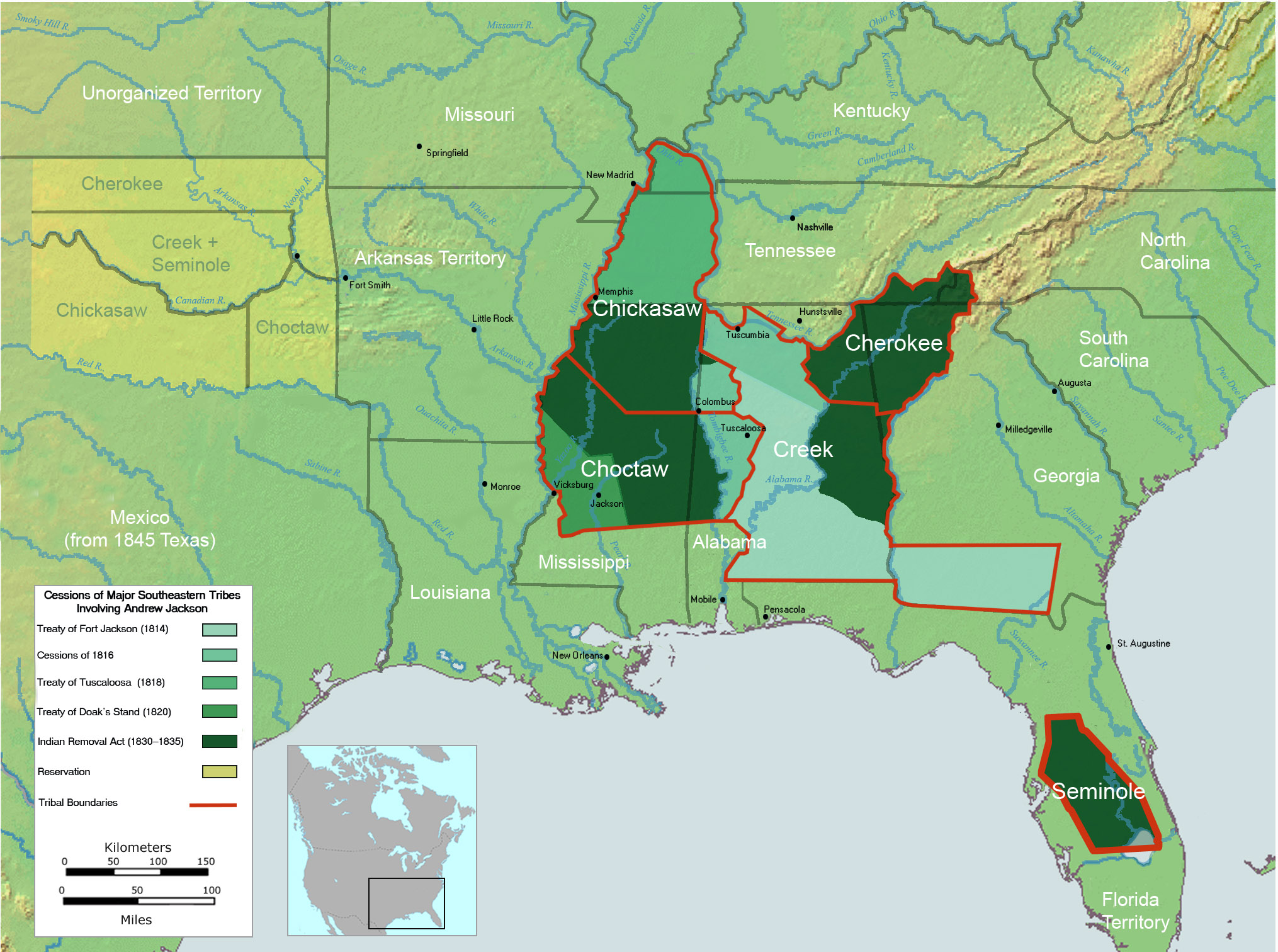
The Indian Removal Act of 1830 and treaties involving Jackson before his presidency displaced most of the major tribes of the Southeast from their traditional territories east of the Mississippi River

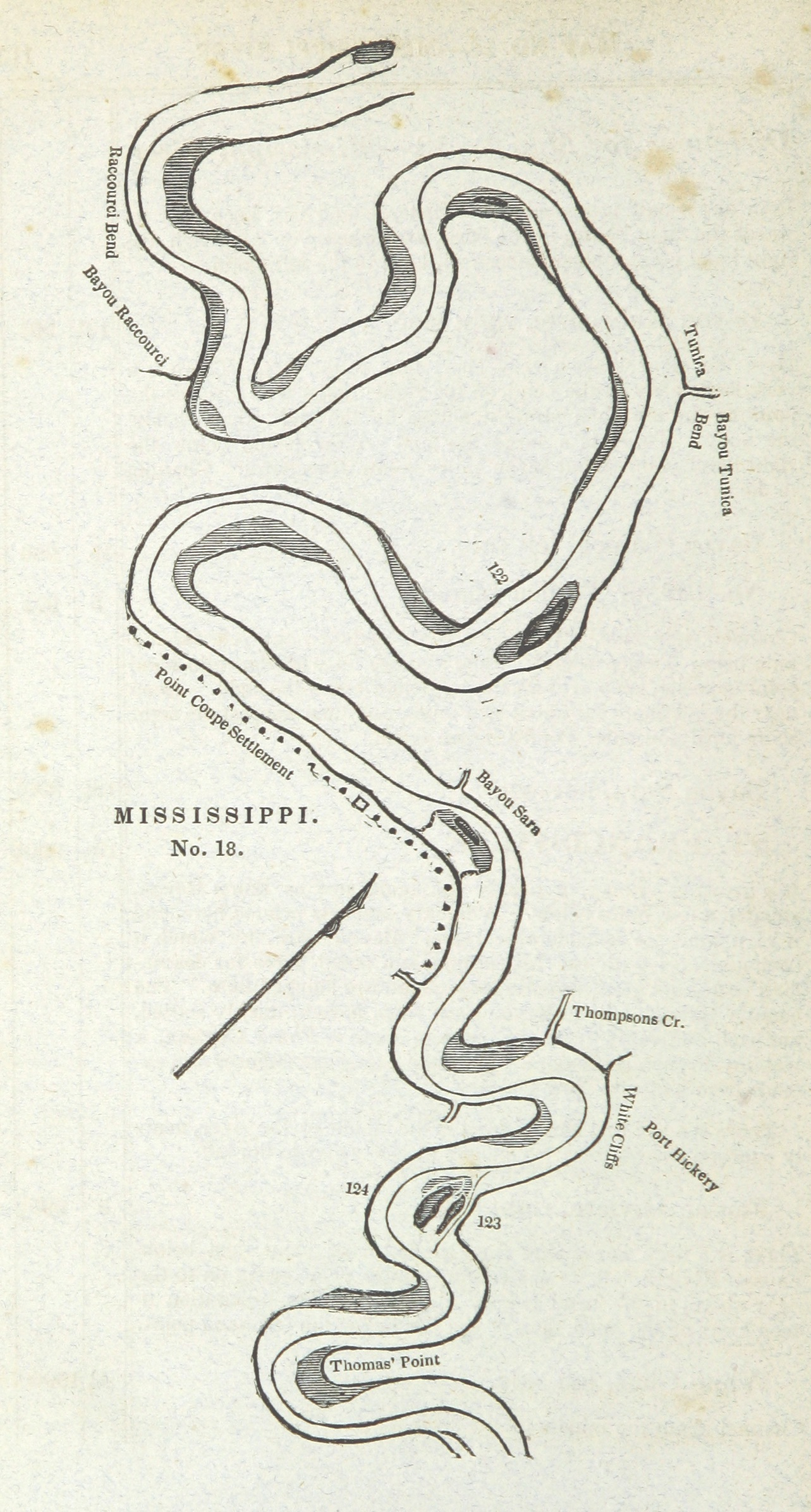
1832 map of the River, showing Prophet's Island as 123–124

The steamboat Monmouth disaster of October 31, 1837, killed approximately 311 Muscogee people who were being forcibly removed from their ancestral homeland in the southern United States to the Indian Territory, in present-day Oklahoma. The deaths were the result of a nighttime boat collision on the Mississippi River just north of Baton Rouge, Louisiana. The Monmouth was one of seven steamboats transporting roughly 3,000 Muscogee and enslaved Blacks who were part of what historians call Detachment 6 during Creek Removal.

== Collision ==
The U.S. Army ("the Alabama Emigrating Co. through the agency of Col. W. A. Campbell") hired three steamboats at New Orleans, the Yazoo, the John Newton, and the Monmouth, to move the "Upper Creeks" band of Muscogee to the Great Plains. Some 700 passengers were put on board the Monmouth. En route from New Orleans to the Arkansas River, near Prophet Island (now Profit Island, 30.5910°N 91.2948°W), in drizzly dark conditions, the negligently crewed Monmouth collided with a steamer called Warren that was towing a ship called Trenton or Tremont. The steamboat was apparently violating traditional navigation rules of the river and veered unexpectedly into the path of the Warren.

== Casualties ==
According to a contemporary report "the hull sank and the cabin floated downstream in two parts." The destruction of the Monmouth resulted in the drowning deaths of the ship's fireman, the ship's bar-keeper, and an estimated 311 passengers. The owners of the steamboat said there were 693 passengers aboard and the loss of life was only 230 with "many of the survivors badly injured." The survivors were picked up by the Yazoo, the John Newton, and the Warren. The bodies of the Muscogee dead were buried in mass graves near Port Allen.

The Monmouth was reportedly a little over a year old, meaning she was launched sometime in 1836. The death toll from the Monmouth would stand as the Mississippi River's worst transportation disaster until the American Civil War. The loss of life in the Monmouth disaster contributed to the overall death toll of the Trail of Tears.

== Oral history ==
The WPA Indian-Pioneer Project project recorded in the 1930s collected a retelling of the disaster:

When we boarded the ship, it was at night time and it was raining, cloudy and dark. There were dangerous waves of water. The people aboard the ship did not want the ship to start on the journey at night but to wait until the next day. The men in command of the ship disregarded all suggestions and said, "the ship is going tonight." ¶ The ship was the kind that had an upper and lower deck. There were great stacks of boxes which contained whiskey in bottles. The officers in charge of the ship became intoxicated and even induced some of the Indians to drink. This created an uproar and turmoil. ¶ Timbochee Barnett, who was my father, and I begged the officers to stop the ship until morning as the men in charge of the steering of the ship could not control the ship and keep it on it's [sic] course but was causing it to go around and around. ¶ We saw a night ship coming down the stream. We could distinguish these ships as they had lights. Many of those on board our ship tried to tell the officers to give the command to stay to one side so that the night ship could pass on by. It was then that it seemed that the ship was just turned loose because it was taking a zig-zag course in the water until it rammed right into the center of the night boat. ¶ Then there was the screaming of the children, men, women, mothers and fathers when the ship began to sink. Everyone on the lower deck that could was urged to go up on the upper deck until some of the smaller boats could come to the rescue. The smaller boats were called by signal and they came soon enough but the lower deck had been hit so hard it was broken in two and was rapidly sinking and a great many of the Indians were drowned.

== See also ==
- Jim Boy
- Carey A. Harris
- 1837 in the United States
- List of disasters in the United States by death toll

== Sources ==
- Haveman, Christopher D. (2016). Rivers of Sand: Creek Indian Emigration, Relocation, and Ethnic Cleansing in the American South. Indians of the Southeast. Lincoln: University of Nebraska Press. ISBN 978-0-8032-8490-6. LCCN 2015008315. OCLC 933515729. Project MUSE book 43900.
