= George Wylie Henderson =

American writer

George Wylie Henderson (June 14, 1904 – 1965) was an American writer of the Harlem Renaissance.

== Biography ==
Henderson was born in 1904 in Warriorstand, Alabama, an unincorporated area of Macon County. He attended the limited and segregated rural school. He went to Tuskegee Institute, where he learned printing as a trade.

As a young man, Henderson moved to New York, joining the Great Migration of hundreds of thousands of blacks from the South to Northern and Midwestern industrial cities in the early part of the 20th century. He supported himself as a printer for the New York Daily News.

He also worked as a writer, becoming associated with writers and artists of the Harlem Renaissance. Henderson lived in New York City until his death.

From 1932 to 1933, he published nine stories in The New York Daily News, in its "Daily Story from Real Life" series. In addition, he became a regular contributor of short stories in Redbook Magazine, which had national distribution.

Henderson also published two novels, Ollie Miss (1935) and Jule (1946), which dealt with pressures on African Americans in the modernizing South. These novels were reprinted in 1989 and 1990, respectively, by the University of Alabama Press, with an introduction by Blyden Jackson. David Nicholls suggests that these expressed some of the "individualist ethos" of Booker T. Washington, president of the Tuskegee Institute which Henderson had attended. They also express contrasts, as Ollie Miss is about an African-American woman near Tuskegee who wants a farm where she can raise her child. Jule, by contrast, deals with a young man who leaves the South to go to the city in the North, similar to Henderson's own journey of advancement, to an urban center that held the promise of autonomy.
