= Big Warrior =

Muscogee Nation chief (died 1825)

- Tustanagee Thlucco
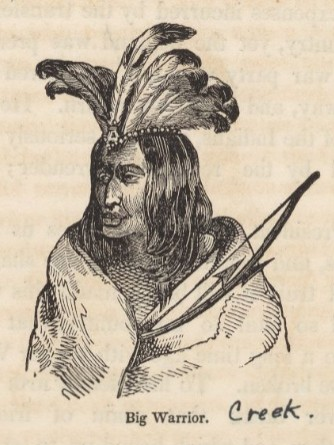
- American artist's conception of Big Warrior in an 1847 book illustration designed by William Croome.

Creek leader
- In office Early 1800s – 1825
- Preceded by: None
- Succeeded by: None

One of two principal chiefs of the Creek National Council

Personal details
- Born: Tustanagee Thlucco Tukabatchee
- Died: March 8, 1825 Washington, D.C.
- Party: Creek National Council
- Spouse: Tefvhoe
- Children: Tuskenea, Yargee

Big Warrior or Tustanagee Thlucco (Tvstanagi Rakkē in Mvskokē «Big Warrior» < rak·kē «big») was a principal chief of the Muscogee Nation until his death on March 8, 1825. He was referred to as "one of the most powerful Creeks allied with the United States".

== Early life ==
Big Warrior was from the town of Tukabatchee. His father was of Piankeshaw descent and his mother was Tukabatchee. He married a Tukabatchee woman named Tefvhoe.

The name Tustanagee Thlucco is actually a war title meaning "great warrior," and was given to the man who led all the warriors of a town. No other Creek name is recorded for Big Warrior.

Big Warrior, representing the Upper Creek Towns as Speaker, shared the leadership of the Creek National Council with Little Prince, principal chief of the Lower Towns. He is described as having "owned a sizeable plantation which enslaved men, women, and children worked." He reportedly kept between 70 or 80 slaves, with one early 20th-century historian holding that he enslaved 300. He spoke no English. General Thomas Woodward described Big Warrior as the largest man that he had ever seen among the Creeks and as spotted as a leopard.

== Leadership ==
He would become Mekko (chief) of Tukabatchee in the early 1800s and Principal Chief of the Upper Creeks. He did not like or trust the Americans, but believed it was in the Nations best interests to ally themselves with them. Big Warrior's policies made him a target of the Red Sticks during the Creek Civil War. Tukabatchee was surrounded by Red Sticks in 1813 and its inhabitants had to find asylum in Koweta, among the Lower Creeks. Tukabatchee would be rebuilt following the end of the Creek Civil War in 1814.

He had two sons, Tuskenea and Yargee and at least two daughters. Tuskenea would replace Big Warrior as Mekko of Tukabatchee who would be succeeded by Opothleyahola a few years later.

=== Alliance with the US government ===
In October 1811, Tecumseh visited Tukabatchee to deliver his message of pan-tribal unity and hostility to the United States. Nevertheless, Big Warrior remained intent on maintaining treaty alliances with the United States. The U.S. threatened the Creek Nation with invasion in order to obtain justice for crimes committed on the Tennessee Frontier and along the Federal Road. Big Warrior and the Creek National Council sought to prevent a deterioration in the relationship between Creek and the United States and so in response, they pursued those guilty of the crimes, which included robbery and murder. The men called on to punish and sometimes execute the guilty parties were known as Law Menders. These actions were opposed by many Creek people, who joined the Red Sticks and fought against Big Warrior and the Council in the Creek War.

=== Treaties and loss of land ===
Big Warrior promised the American allies that the Creek would pay for assistance in the war against the Red Sticks. When peace terms were being negotiated, an April 14th letter from Major General Thomas Pinckney to Benjamin Hawkins instructed him to inform their Creek allies that friendly Chiefs would be remunerated for the land cessions, and they would be compensated for damaged property. Both the Red Sticks and U.S. troops had contributed to the property damage, where soldiers had "razed several towns and slaughtered nearly all the livestock in Creek country." However, Andrew Jackson did not uphold the promise to compensate their Creek allies for their property damage, which angered Big Warrior. In a letter he wrote to Hawkins, he said "We are not asking [Jackson] for any thing. We only want our pay for Individuals out of our own funds, and that on the offer of General Pinckney." Big Warrior's objections did not convince Jackson, who according to the Minutes of Occurrences at Fort Jackson threatened to put Big Warrior in chains for insisting on compensation. Hawkins described Big Warrior as having "a difficult part to act," with the competing obligations to the U.S. allies and to the Creek people in terms of securing treaty terms. Historians such as Claudio Saunt take a more critical view, analyzing different statements that Big Warrior made both publicly and privately during treaty negotiations and suggesting that he valued compensation for personal losses more than he valued the land being ceded away which comprised "thousands of acres of forests held in common by Creeks."

Ultimately, the 1814 Treaty of Fort Jackson forced harsh settlement terms on the entire Creek Nation. In the treaty, the United States "declared the Creeks a defeated people and took nearly 22 million acres of land in payment for war expenses", and Big Warrior was described along with other National Council chiefs as being "forced" to sign it.

== Later years and death ==
In the following decade, Big Warrior became an opponent of further land cessions, including seeking compensation for land taken in the Treaty of Fort Jackson. Big Warrior owned a tavern that was operated by his daughter and her husband near Fort Bainbridge and an additional tavern near Warriorstand. Big Warrior worked against a land treaty made by William McIntosh in 1825, the Treaty of Indian Springs. The Creek National Council did not authorize the treaty and they sent a delegation to Washington, D.C. to protest the ratification. Big Warrior travelled as a part of the Creek delegation, and he died on March 8, 1825, while in Washington, D.C.
