= Oche Finceco =

Mixed-Creek Nation tribal chief, often documented in lithographs

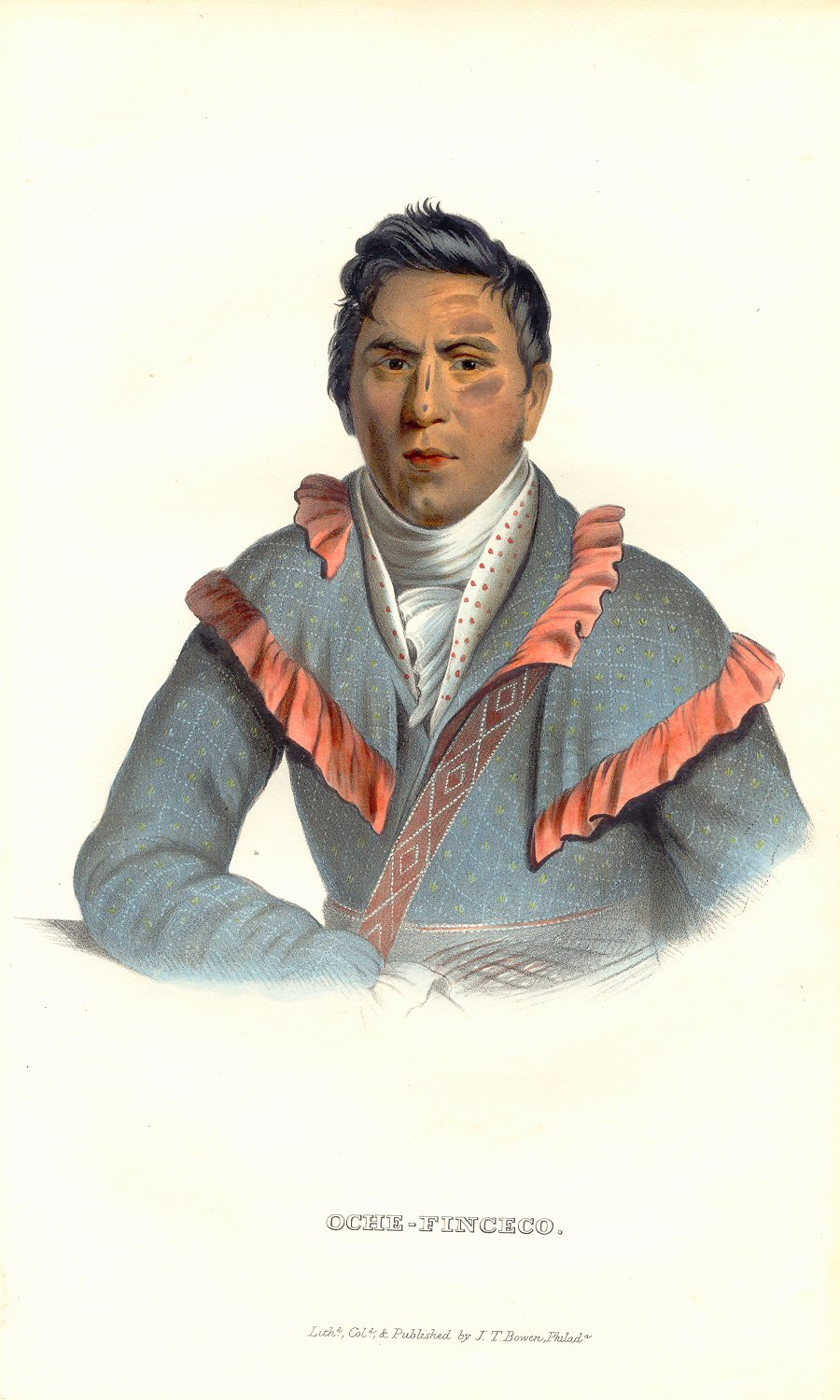
Oche Finceco painted by Charles Bird King

Oche Finceco, also known as Charles Cornell (Note: alternatively spelled Cornells) (died c. 1827), was a leader of the Muscogee Creek Nation. In the aftermath of the controversial Treaty of Indian Springs, Finceco was part of the delegation of Creek chiefs who travelled to Washington, D.C. to negotiate the Treaty of Washington in 1826. For his efforts, he was paid US$10,000. He quickly lost all the money gambling, and subsequently committed suicide.

== Personal life ==
Finceco was the son of Alexander Cornell, a Creek of mixed ancestry. Finceco married Peggy McGillivray, the daughter of Alexander McGillivray.

Finceco notably had his portrait painted by Charles Bird King. King considered Finceco to be "the most handsome young Indian" he had met. Thomas L. McKenney stated that Finceco was "held in much esteem by his people". McKenney noted in 1827 that after Finceco's death, his grave was well kept, and a roof was being constructed over the site.
