= Coweta (tribal town) =

Native American town

Coweta (Creek: Kvwetv) was a tribal town and one of the four mother towns of the Muscogee Confederacy in what is now the Southeast United States, along with Kasihta (Cusseta), Abihka, and Tuckabutche.

Coweta was located on the Chattahoochee River in what the Spanish called Apalachicola Province now in the modern state of Alabama. It was a central trading city of the Lower Towns of the Mucogee Confederacy. Members of the tribal town were also known as Caouitas or Caoüita.^{[p. 391]}

The Cherokee language name for all the Lower Creek is Anikhawitha.^{[p. 391]}

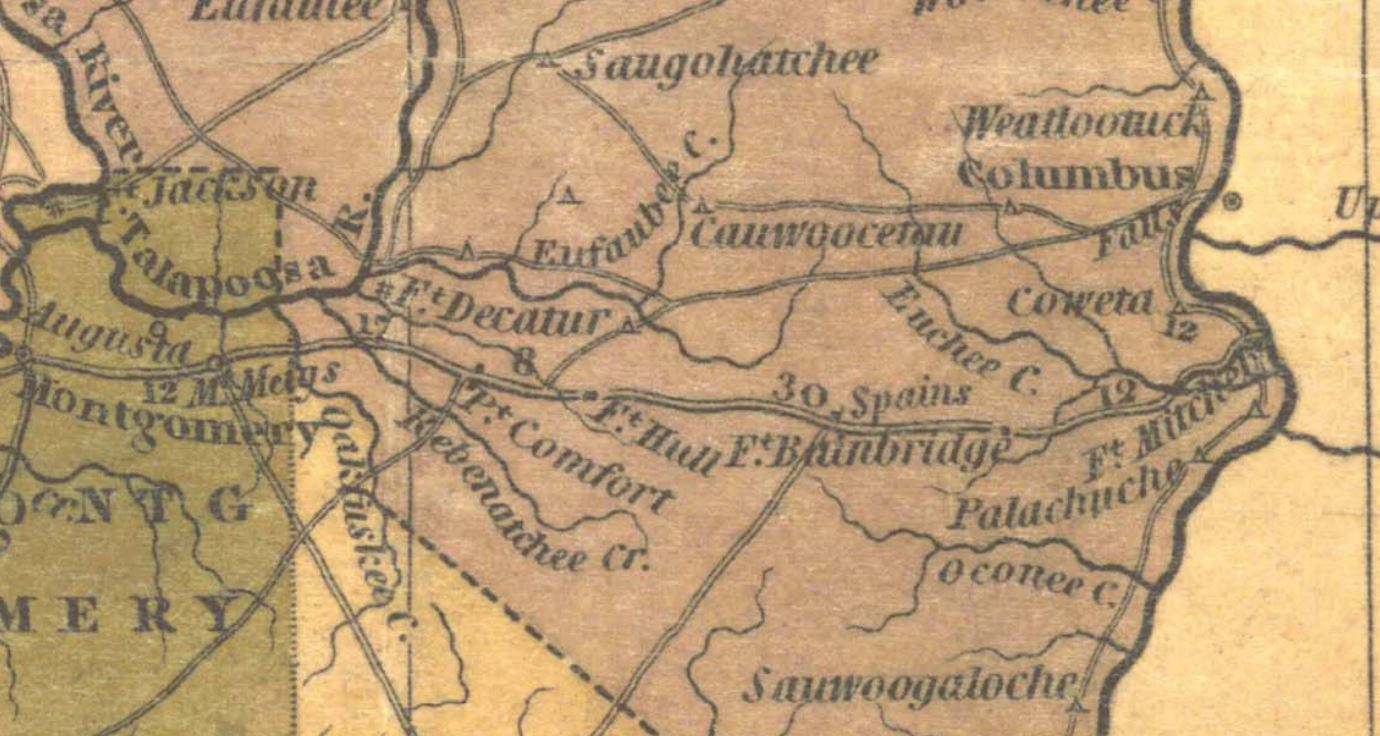
Coweta (located to the right) as portrayed in Henry Schenck Tanner's 1830 The Traveler's Pocket Map of Alabama.

== Notable members ==
- William McIntosh (1775–1825)
- Mary Musgrove (ca. 1700–1767)
- Emperor Brim (died 1733)
- Malatchi (1720-1756)
