= Thomas Simpson Woodward =

American brigadier general (1797–1859)

Thomas S. Woodward
- Born: 1796; Elbert County, Georgia
- Died: February 4, 1860 (aged 63–64); Winn Parish, Louisiana

Thomas Simpson Woodward (February 22, 1797 – February 4, 1860) was a plantation owner, land speculator, memoirist, and a U.S. state militia general during the First Creek War. He settled and named the area that developed into Tuskegee, Alabama. Late in life, he wrote letters about his experiences with and beliefs about Native Americans.

== Life and career ==
Woodward was born in Elbert County, Georgia in 1797 and was orphaned at a young age. He was raised by his mother and her brother. The South Carolina Congressman William Woodward was his uncle, and South Carolina Congressman Joseph A. Woodward was his cousin.

He became a brigadier general in the Georgia militia and fought alongside Creek Indians.

He migrated west and established a plantation in Camden, Arkansas, a town he named. He later moved to Wheeling in Winn Parish, Louisiana and established a 16,000-acre plantation, which he named Montgomery after the capital city of Alabama. With James Dent he plotted land he owned and named it Tuskegee.

A collection of his letters was published in 1859 as Woodward's Reminiscences of the Creek, or Muscogee Indians, Contained in Letters to Friends in Georgia and Alabama, in Montgomery, Alabama. According to an introduction to his book he had a daughter with one of his slaves and moved to Louisiana.

He had a son named Thomas Woodward who was a colonel in Louisiana. He died February 4, 1860, at his home in Winn Parish after a long illness.

A painted portrait of Woodward is preserved by the Alabama Department of Archives and History.
