= Tukabatchee =

Mother town in the Muscogee Confederacy

Coordinates: 32°28′38″N 85°52′47″W

Tuckabatchee Tokepahce (Creek)
- Interactive map of Tuckabatchee; Tokepahce (Creek)
- Location: Elmore County, Alabama

Alabama Register of Landmarks and Heritage
- Official name: Tukabahchi
- Designated: July 21, 1977

Tuskatche-mico, or the bird-tail king of the Cusitahs (John Trumbull, 1790)

Tuckabatchee, Tukabatchee, or Tuckabutche (Creek: Tokepahce) is one of the four mother towns of the Muscogee Creek confederacy. The tribal town was located on west bank of the Tallapoosa River opposite Uphapee Creek in what is now Elmore County, Alabama, from at least 1690 until after 1835. It was considered part of the Upper Creeks grouping.

As of 1775 the settlement was between Big Bend Creek and Uphapee Creek and on both sides of the Tallapoosa, extending three miles along the river. The population in 1790 was estimated at 780 people.

The town is believed to be the first site of the ancient 'busk' fire which began the Green Corn Ceremony. Tukabatchee was the home of Big Warrior, one of the two principal chiefs of the Creeks until his death in 1826. Chief Opothleyahola was born here in 1780. In 1811 Tecumseh and Tenskwatawa (better known as the Prophet) addressed Creek leaders in the Tukabatchee town square. Tecumseh was so disappointed in Big Warrior's response at the end of his speech against American expansion that he said upon reaching Chalagawtha the Prophet would "...stamp his foot and all of Tuckabatchee's cabins would fall." An ahistorical legend subsequently developed stating that the town was leveled by the New Madrid earthquake a month later but there is neither documentary nor archeological evidence that the town was destroyed.

During the Creek War in 1813, Red Stick rebels surrounded the town. The siege was lifted by Creeks from the nearby town of Cusseta. As reported in Niles' Register, "Extract of a letter, dated Creek Agency, 27th January, 1813.—The civil war among the Creeks has raged with great fury. The fanatics have destroyed Tuckabachee, the chiefs and the inhabitants having previously left it, under an escort of warriors from Cusseta and Cowetaw, and moved down to Cowetaw. Since then they have destroyed Kialijee and several of its inhabitants, and more than thirty have been killed on both sides. Aubeecoochee behaved with consummate bravery. A party under a prophet killed four of their chiefs—the warriors killed him and his party, and hearing that Ouckfuskaachee sided with the prophets, they turned on them and cut the whole off."

Variant spellings include Tiquipache.

== Sources ==
- Wright, Amos J. (2003). Historic Indian Towns in Alabama, 1540–1838. University of Alabama Press. doi:10.2307/jj.30347380. ISBN 978-0-8173-8387-9. LCCN 2003000201. OCLC 772845336.
