= Benjamin Hawkins =

American politician (1754–1816)

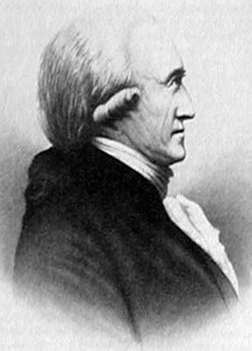
- In office November 27, 1789 – March 4, 1795
- Preceded by: None
- Succeeded by: Timothy Bloodworth

Member of the Congress of the Confederation
- In office 1781 – 1783; 1787

Member of the North Carolina House of Representatives
- In office 1778 – 1779; 1784

Personal details
- Born: August 15, 1754 Granville County, Province of North Carolina, British America
- Died: June 6, 1816 (aged 61) Crawford County, Georgia, U.S.
- Resting place: Roberta, Georgia, U.S. 32°40′0.61″N 84°5′45.73″W
- Party: Pro-Administration (1789–1791); Anti-Administration (1791–1795)
- Relations: Philemon Hawkins II (father); Micajah T. Hawkins (nephew); William Hawkins (nephew)
- Education: College of New Jersey

Benjamin Hawkins (August 15, 1754 – June 6, 1816) was an American planter, statesman and a U.S. Indian agent. He was a delegate to the Continental Congress and a United States Senator from North Carolina, having grown up among the planter elite. Appointed by George Washington in 1796 as one of three commissioners to the Creeks, in 1801 President Jefferson named him "principal agent for Indian affairs south of the Ohio [River]", and was principal Indian agent to the Creek Indians.

Hawkins established the Creek Agency and his plantation near present-day Roberta, Georgia, in what became Crawford County. He learned the Muscogee language, and had a Creek woman, Lavinia Downs, as common-law wife, who, in the Creek's matrilineal society, provided an entry into that world. He wrote extensively about the Creek and other Southeast tribes: the Choctaw, Cherokee and Chickasaw. He eventually built a large complex using African slave labor, including mills, and raised a considerable quantity of cattle and hogs.

== Early life and education ==
Benjamin Hawkins was born to Philemon Hawkins and Delia (Martin) Hawkins on August 15, 1754, the third of four sons. The family owned a slave plantation in what was then Granville County, North Carolina, but is now Warren County. He attended the county schools, then at the College of New Jersey (later to become Princeton University). He was "apt at multiple languages", a linguistic competence that would later enable him to learn Indian languages. When the college (which he never graduated from) temporarily closed due to the outbreak of war, Hawkins was commissioned a Colonel and served for several years on George Washington's staff as his main interpreter of French.

== Career ==
Hawkins was released from federal service late in 1777, as Washington learned to rely on Lafayette for dealing with the French. He returned home, where he was elected to the North Carolina House of Representatives in 1778. He served there until 1779, and again in 1784. The North Carolina General Assembly sent him to the Continental Congress as their delegate from 1781 to 1783, and again in 1787.

In 1789, Hawkins was a delegate to the Fayetteville Convention that ratified the United States Constitution. He was elected to the first U.S. Senate, where he served from 1789 to 1795. Although the Senate did not have organized political parties at the time, Hawkins' views aligned with different groups. Early in his Senate career, he was counted in the ranks of those senators viewed as pro-Administration, but by the third congress, he generally sided with senators of the Republican or Anti-Administration Party.

=== U.S. Indian agent ===
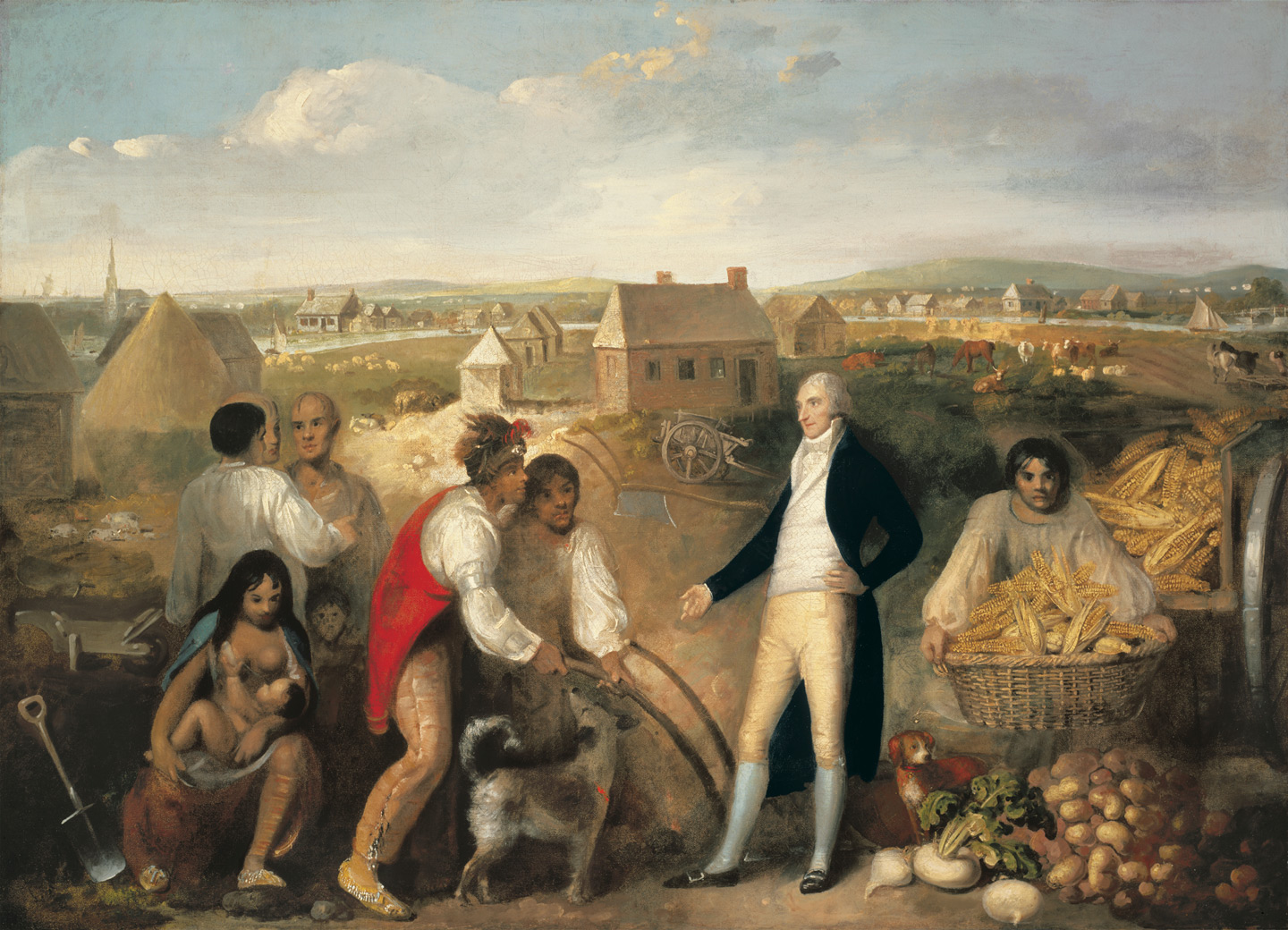
Benjamin Hawkins, portrayed on his plantation, teaches Creek people to use European technology. Painted in 1805.

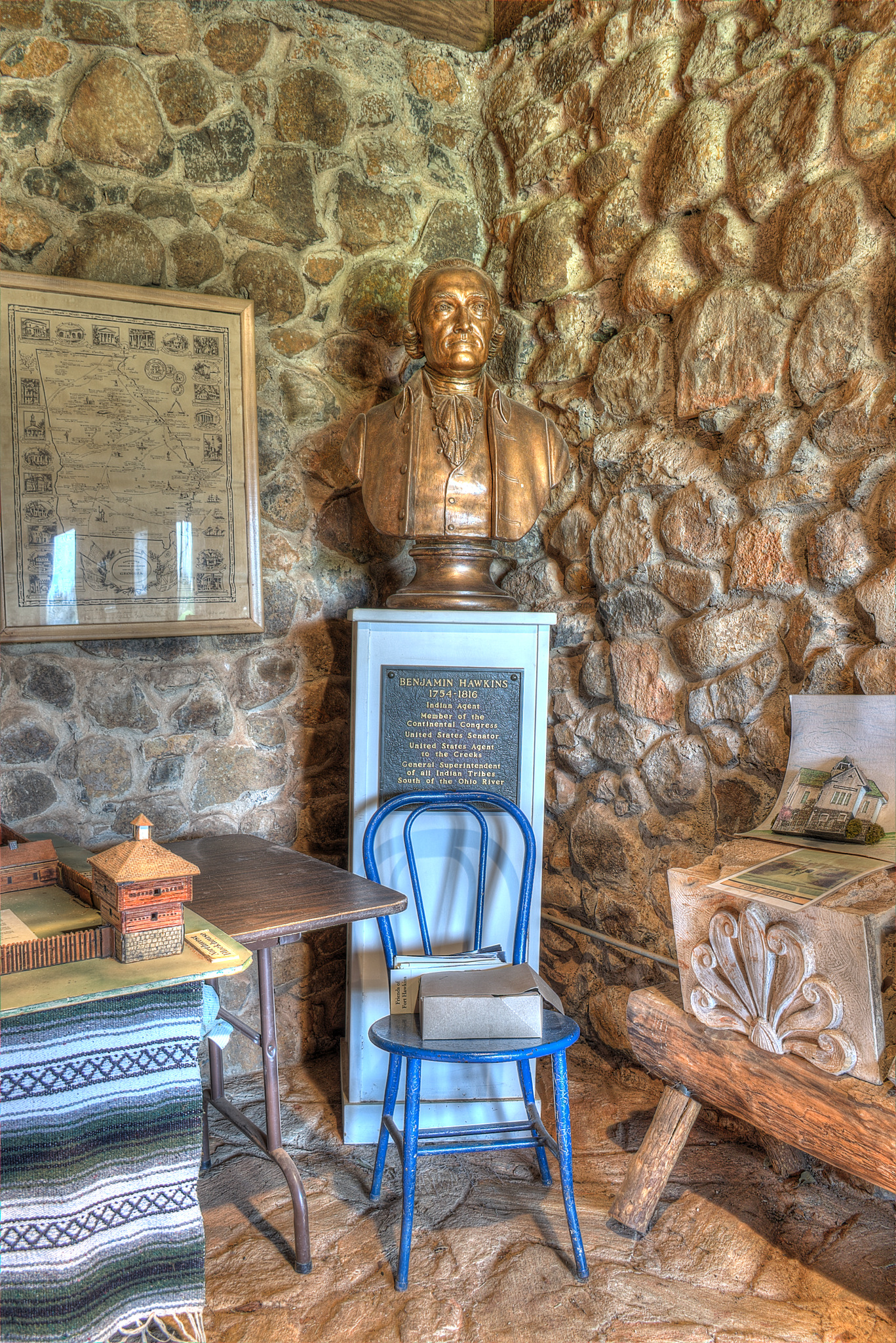
Bust on display at Fort Benjamin Hawkins

In 1785, Hawkins had served as a representative for the Congress in negotiations over land with the Creek Indians of the Southeast. He was generally successful, and convinced the tribe to lessen their raids for several years, although he could not conclude a formal treaty. The Creek wanted to deal with the 'head man'. They finally signed the Treaty of New York (1790) after Hawkins convinced George Washington to become involved.

In 1786, Hawkins and fellow Indian agents Andrew Pickens and Joseph Martin concluded a treaty with the Choctaw nation at Seneca Old Town, also known as Hopewell, the plantation of Andrew Pickens, near Clemson, South Carolina. They set out the boundaries for the Choctaw lands as well as provisions for relations between the tribe and the U.S. government.

In 1789, conditions among the Creeks seemed to indicate an urgency for his return to the Creek country. Accordingly, he left Tennessee early in September for Fort Wilkinson on the Oconee River in Georgia. The next few months were spent with the Creeks. January 1, 1789, was set as the date for the assembling of the commissioners for running the Creek line in conformity to the treaties at New York and Coleraine. Hawkins had some difficulty in persuading the Creeks to agree to the running of the line, as many of the younger warriors were opposed. On February 16 Hawkins reported to Secretary of War, James McHenry that the line had been run from the Tugalo River over Currahee Mountain to the main south branch of the Oconee River. Though about sixteen families of Georgians were found on the Creek lands in the area known as Wofford's Settlement, McHenry was told "...I am happy in being able to assure you that there was no diversity of opinion among us, and that the line was closed in perfect harmony." This line became known as the Hawkins Line.

In 1796, Washington appointed Benjamin Hawkins as General Superintendent of Indian Affairs, dealing with all tribes south of the Ohio River. As principal agent to the Creek tribe, Hawkins soon moved to present-day Crawford County in Georgia where he established his home and the Creek Agency. He studied the language and was adopted by the Creek. He wrote extensively about them and the other southeast tribes.

=== Georgia ===
Hawkins' plans for the Indians was a "Plan of Civilization", by which he meant adopting the European-American lifestyle, raising crops and animals on farms. He began to teach European-American agricultural practices to the Creek, and started a farm at his and Lavinia's home on the Flint River. He brought his enslaved Black workers from North Carolina, and eventually purchased others. He hired other workers to assist them in clearing several hundred acres for his plantation. They built a sawmill, gristmill, and a trading post for the agency. Hawkins expanded his operation to include more than 1,000 head of cattle and a large number of hogs, and raised "immense crops" of corn and other provisions. For years, he met with chiefs on his porch and discussed matters there. His personal hard work and open-handed generosity won him such respect that reports say that he never lost an animal to Indian raiders. He became a respected and trusted man among the community, and bore the title as “The Beloved Man of the Four Nations.” Cherokee women told Hawkins "that, of the several Indian agents who visited them, he was the first who thought it worth while to examine into the situation of the women".

He contributed to the 19 years of peace between settlers and the tribe, the longest such period during European-American settlement. When in 1806 the government built a fort at the fall line of the Ocmulgee River, to protect expanding settlements just east of modern Macon, Georgia, the government named it Fort Benjamin Hawkins in his honor.

Hawkins saw much of his work to preserve peace destroyed in 1812. A group of Creek rebels, known as Red Sticks, were working to revive traditional ways and halt encroachment by European Americans. The ensuing civil war among the Creeks coincided with the War of 1812.

During the Creek War of 1813–1814, Hawkins organized "friendly" Creek Indians under the command of chief William McIntosh to aid Georgia and Tennessee militias in their forays against the traditionalist Red Sticks. General Andrew Jackson led the defeat of the Red Sticks at the Battle of Horseshoe Bend, in present-day Alabama. Hawkins was unable to attend negotiations of the Treaty of Fort Jackson in August 1814, which required the Creeks to cede most of their territory and give up their way of life.

Hawkins later organized "friendly" Creek warriors to oppose a British force on the Apalachicola River that threatened to rally the scattered Red Sticks and reignite the war on the Georgia frontier. Hawkins learned of the peace on February 25, 1815. From February through June 1815 Edward Nicolls engaged in a heated exchange of letters (Note: Sent by Nicolls on February 28, April 28, May 12 and June 12, 1815) with Hawkins as U.S. Indian Agent. (Note: Hawkins responded on March 19 and 24, May 24 and 28) Hawkins accused Nicolls of being overzealous and of overstepping his authority in his personal defense of Redstick Creeks, Seminoles, and their maroon Creole allies, whom some Americans in authority viewed as nothing more than runaway slaves, lost or unclaimed property.

Hawkins tried more than once to resign his post and return from the Georgia frontier, but no President would accept his resignation. (Dale Cox quotes a letter from Hawkins to Governor Early, which says that President Madison accepted his resignation, and that Mr Limbaugh is to take charge in the interim, until a successor is formally appointed.) He remained Superintendent until his death. Near the end of his life, he formally married Lavinia Downs in a European-American ceremony, making their children legitimate in United States society. They already belonged to Downs' clan among the Creek, who had a matrilineal kinship system. The children gained status from their mother's clan and people, and their mother's eldest brother was usually more important in their lives than their biological father.

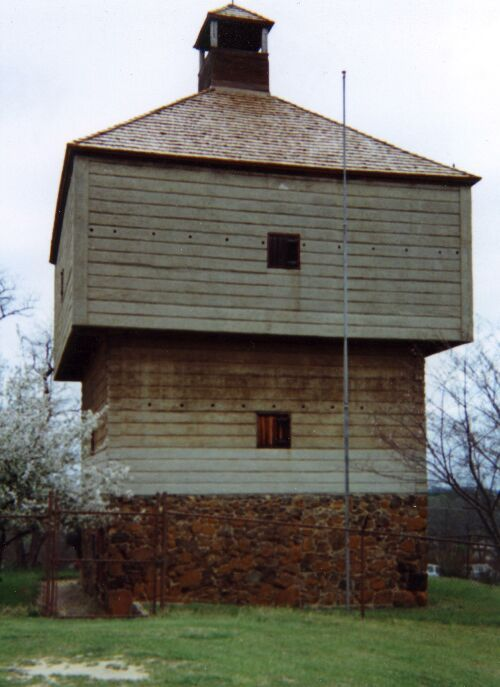
Fort Benjamin Hawkins, Georgia (U.S. state)

Fort Hawkins was built overlooking the ancient site since designated as the Ocmulgee National Monument. Revealing 17,000 years of human habitation, it is a National Historic Landmark and has been sacred for centuries to the Creek. It has massive earthwork mounds built nearly 1,000 years ago as expressions of the religious and political world of the Mississippian culture, the ancestors to the Creek.

== Hawkins and slavery ==
Hawkins' plantation was farmed by enslaved labor, but beyond that his unhappy record on slavery has been overlooked. He transformed the Creek Agency and Fort Hawkins into holding stations for fugitive slaves, and paid Indians $50 (equivalent to $1,075 in 2025) for every fugitive delivered there. (He expected to be reimbursed by their owners.) Captured Blacks that did not have an owner, he told the Creeks to keep; i.e., he encouraged slavery among the Creeks.

It was Hawkins who first used the term negro fort to refer to the British Post on the Apalachicola River, at that time in Spanish Florida. Hawkins started the call for its capture or destruction.

== Personal life ==
He married Susan Lavinia Downs, who some believe was a Creek Indian woman (the Creeks wanted him to take a Creek wife), whereas other evidence indicates that she was a white woman. They had a total of six daughters: Georgia, Muscogee, Cherokee, Carolina, Virginia, and Jeffersonia, and one son, James Madison Hawkins. In 1812, thinking he was on his death bed, Hawkins remarried his wife Susan Lavinia Downs to make sure their children were legitimate in U.S. society. Jeffersonia was born after this marriage. He had seven children with her, although he resisted Creek pressure to marry her until near the end of his life.

Hawkins was close to his nephew William Hawkins, whom he made a co-executor of his estate along with his wife; he bequeathed to William a share of his estate, reputed to be quite large. This bequest became a source of contention among his heirs, especially as he had not altered his will to include his youngest daughter Jeffersonia.

== Death ==
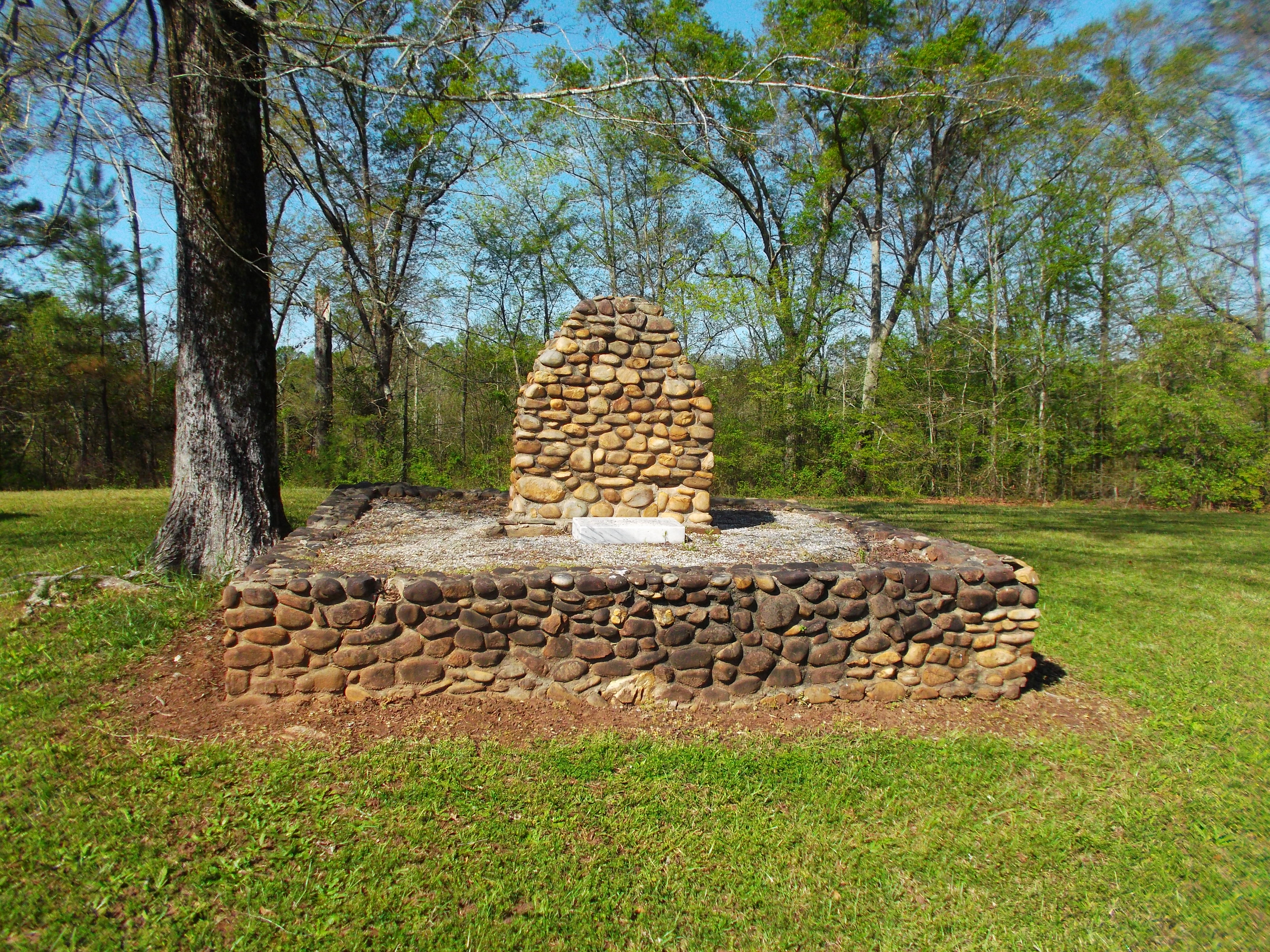
Benjamin Hawkins's gravesite

After the British withdrew on May 16, 1815, Hawkins was organizing another force when he died of a sudden illness on June 6, 1816. He was buried at the Creek Agency near the Flint River and in the vicinity of Roberta. By 1913, the grave was still unmarked and had fallen into dereliction before the Daughters of the American Revolution took it into its care. A marker was put in place in 1931.

Hawkins was succeeded as Indian agent by David Mitchell, former governor of Georgia.

== Archival material ==
- The Georgia Historical Society has three boxes of Hawkins material, some of which has been published.

== Legacy and honors ==
- Hawkinsville, Georgia is named in his honor.
- Hawkins County in Tennessee bears his name.
- He is the namesake of the Benjamin Hawkins Boy Scout Camp near Byron, Georgia. This camp was sold in 2024.
- The archeological site of the original Fort Benjamin Hawkins is listed on the National Register of Historic Places (NRHP), and it is within the Fort Hill Historic District of Macon, Georgia, also listed on the NRHP.
- Hawkins was elected a member of the American Antiquarian Society in 1813.
- Hawkins was purported to have coined the phrase "If God is willing, and the Creeks don’t rise”.
- Hawkins appears in John Trumbull's 1824 painting General George Washington Resigning His Commission, which was featured on the reverse of the United States five-thousand-dollar bill.

== Further reading (most recent first) ==
- Robbie Franklyn Ethridge, Creek Country: The Creek Indians and Their World, Chapel Hill: University of North Carolina Press, 2003.
- Thomas Foster, editor. The Collected Works of Benjamin Hawkins, 1796-1810. 2003, University of Alabama Press, ISBN 0-8173-5040-3.
- Florette Henri. The Southern Indians and Benjamin Hawkins, 1796-1816. 1986, University of Oklahoma Press, ISBN 0-8061-1968-3.
- C. L. Grant, editor. Benjamin Hawkins: Letters, Journals and Writings. 2 volumes. 1980, Beehive Press, volume 1: ISBN 99921-1-543-2, volume 2: ISBN 99938-28-28-9.

U.S. Senate
Preceded by None	U.S. senator (Class 3) from North Carolina; 1789–1795; Served alongside: Samuel Johnston, Alexander Martin	Succeeded by Timothy Bloodworth
