= Fort Benjamin Hawkins =

- Hawkins Archeological Site
- U.S. National Register of Historic Places
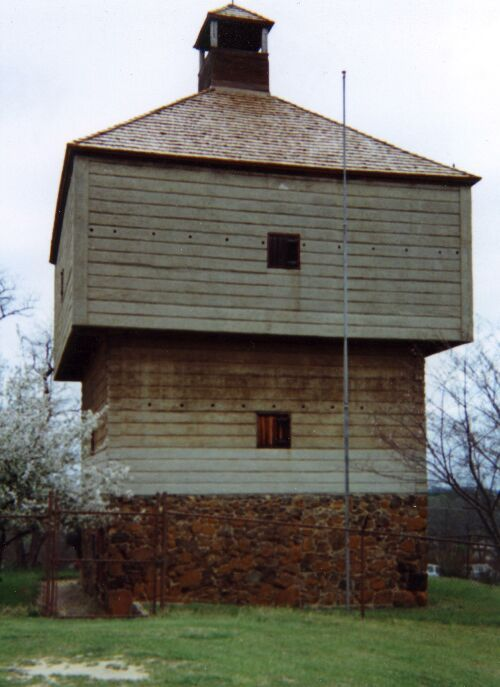
- Fort Hawkins (1938 reconstructed southeastern blockhouse)

- Location within Georgia Location within the United States
- Location: Macon, Georgia
- Coordinates: 32.8489°N 83.6116°W
- Built: 1806
- NRHP reference No.: 77000410
- Added to NRHP: November 23, 1977

Fort Hawkins was a fort built between 1806 and 1810 by the United States Army during President Thomas Jefferson's administration. Built in what is now Georgia on the Fall Line on the east side of the Ocmulgee River, the fort overlooked the Ocmulgee Old Fields. The Lower Creek Trading Path passed by just outside the fort's northwestern blockhouse, and continued in a westerly direction to a natural ford on the Ocmulgee River. The fort became important to the Lower Creek Indians, the United States, and the State of Georgia for economic, military, and political reasons.

The fort originally had a log palisade wall surrounding a 1.4-acre area, which contained living and working quarters for soldiers and officers, as well as two blockhouses on the northwestern and southeastern corners. A replica of the southeastern blockhouse was begun in 1928 based on architectural plans by Curran Ellis and Henry Behr, but not completed until 1938. A small archaeological excavation was conducted in 1936. The Fort Hawkins Archeological Site is listed on the National Register of Historic Places and is included within the boundaries of the Fort Hill Historic District, also listed on the NRHP.

The Fort Hawkins Commission ran the site from 1990-2018. Under the guidance of Chairman Bob Cramer, the commission hired the Lamar Institute to conduct archaeological excavations in 2005. These excavations continued intermittently until 2013, and found evidence of a second palisade wall, as well as several brick buildings, and recovered nearly 40,000 artifacts. Historical research by Dan Elliott has also added greatly to the current understanding of the fort. A replica log cabin was dedicated in 2014 to serve as a Visitors' Center. The commission was replaced by the non-profit Fort Hawkins Foundation, Inc. in 2018, and this organization has run the site ever since.

== History ==
Fort Hawkins was built by the United States in 1806, and was a place of "relatively great economic, military, and political importance." For the Creek Nation, it was a center of the deerskin trade with Americans, who had a trading post or factory there.

The US government used the fort as the Southeastern Command of the U.S. Army. It was "a major troop garrison and bivouac point for regular troops and state militia in several important campaigns, and a major government fur trade factory for regulating the Creek economy." The Creek Indians ceded their lands east of the Ocmulgee River, except for the Ocmulgee Old Fields. The fort was built on the highest ground in the immediate vicinity. The Lower Creek Trading Path passed just outside of the fort's northwestern blockhouse. This ancient path was improved and became a part of the Federal Road to connect the nation's capital city with the ports of Mobile, Alabama, and New Orleans, Louisiana. This change encouraged the travel of many more troops, settlers, and visitors to the area.

Fort Hawkins (not Fort Benjamin Hawkins) was named for Benjamin Hawkins, who served as the General Superintendent of Indian Affairs (1796–1816) South of the Ohio River, as well as principal US Indian agent to the Creek. A former US Senator from North Carolina, Hawkins had been appointed by President George Washington to deal with the Choctaw, Cherokee and Chickasaw in the larger territory, and worked to bring about years of peace between the Creek and American settlers. Hawkins was named the Beloved Man of the Southeastern tribes, indicating the respect they had for him. He married Lavinia Downs, the daughter of Isaac Downs, a veteran of the American Revolutionary War.

Fort Hawkins was used during the U.S. military campaigns of the War of 1812 against Great Britain. General Andrew Jackson visited the Fort and used it as a staging area for the Battle of New Orleans from 1814-15, as well as during the Creek and Seminole wars. After the frontier moved farther west, the military threat to interior Georgia essentially receded. Through the treaties of 1825 and 1826, the Creek were forced to move west of the Chattahoochee River. The city of Macon was founded in 1823, and by 1828, the fort was in private ownership.

== Preservation, reconstruction and excavation ==
From 1928, the Daughters of the American Revolution and the Macon Kiwanis Club raised funds to create a replica of one of the blockhouses to memorialize the fort. In 1936, archaeological a small excavation under the direction of archaeologist Gordon Willey, and supported by workers and funded under the US Works Progress Administration (WPA) was conducted. The reconstruction of a replica of the southeastern blockhouse was completed in 1938. Some of the original stones were recovered to be used in the basement section. The upper floors were made of concrete formed to simulate the original wood timbers, intended to be more durable at a time of uncertain funding for historic projects.

Because historical records had been destroyed when Washington, D.C., was burned during the War of 1812, in 1971 the city authorized limited archaeological excavation to establish the original dimensions of the fort. The excavation revealed numerous ceramic artifacts, including remnants of English-American style dishes used by residents, dated from c.1779 – c.1834. Fort Hawkins was listed on the National Register of Historic Places (NRHP). in 1977.

The City of Macon acquired the historic site in 2002 with help from the state's Greenspace Program and the Peyton Anderson Foundation. After redevelopment, the city and Commission plan to use the fort site as a greenspace park and as a history center for the city. The southeast blockhouse, which is opened to the public, has become an icon of the city. Archeologists were concerned that construction of the Fort Hawkins Grammar School and a road on part of the site in the early 20th century had destroyed the archaeological record. Since 2005, archeological excavations at the fort site have shown that extensive artifacts and stratigraphy have survived and can be interpreted.

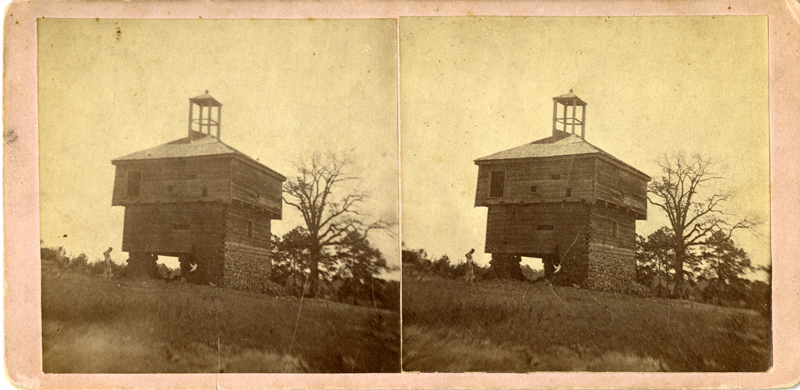
Fort Hawkins c. 1876

From 2005 to 2007, the Fort Hawkins Commission, with funding from the Peyton Anderson Foundation and the City of Macon, hired the Lamar Institute to conduct extensive excavations of the fort site. Principal Archaeologist Dan Elliott's work revealed evidence of two palisade walls having been constructed there. The second palisade enclosed several brick buildings, making it a more substantial complex than originally thought by the limited historical descriptions. In 2007, additional palisades were found. Related historical research has indicated that these were probably constructed from 1809–1810 by the U.S. Army's Regiment of Rifles.

The nearly 40,000 artifacts recovered from the fort era (1806–1821), provide insight into the lives of the different groups of people interacting with one another on the American frontier. This evidence demonstrates a more complex and significant history at the fort than previously known. This physical evidence proves that the fort was more important than previously understood, indicating the need for additional study and a more thorough interpretation of the artifacts. Excavations in October 2011 concentrated on the outer western and southern walls (circa 1810) of the former stockade. An intrusive 19th century cellar, associated with the Thomas Woolfolk plantation, was also sampled during the 2011 field season. Limited excavations in May 2012 focused on discovering remnants of the northwestern blockhouse. Indirect evidence of the blockhouse is indicated by the abrupt termination of the western palisade wall (circa 1806) at its northern end. All outward indications of the blockhouse have been lost to erosion and grading.

Today, the Fort Hawkins Foundation, Inc. operates the Fort Hawkins site, and is currently making plans for the reconstruction of the entire fort complex as a site where the public may immerse themselves in the history and archaeology of Fort Hawkins, the Woolfolk Plantation, and Fort Hawkins School - all of which have been situated on the property at different times.

Fort Hawkins also hosts the Ocmulgee Archaeological Society, which holds its monthly meetings at the Visitors' Center at 6:30 pm on the first Monday of each month (excluding holidays). This archaeological non-profit specializes in public archaeology, and has hosted Fort Hawkins Archaeology Day each May since 2004 on the grounds of this important historic archaeological site

== Recognition ==
- 1977, Fort Hawkins Archeological Site is listed on the National Register of Historic Places(NRHP).
- 1993, Fort Hawkins is included in the Fort Hill Historic District, listed on the NRHP.
- 2002, a State Highway Marker was erected at the fort.
- 2007, Fort Hawkins was featured in Georgia's Archaeology Month program, capped by a weekend celebration at the fort.

== Images ==
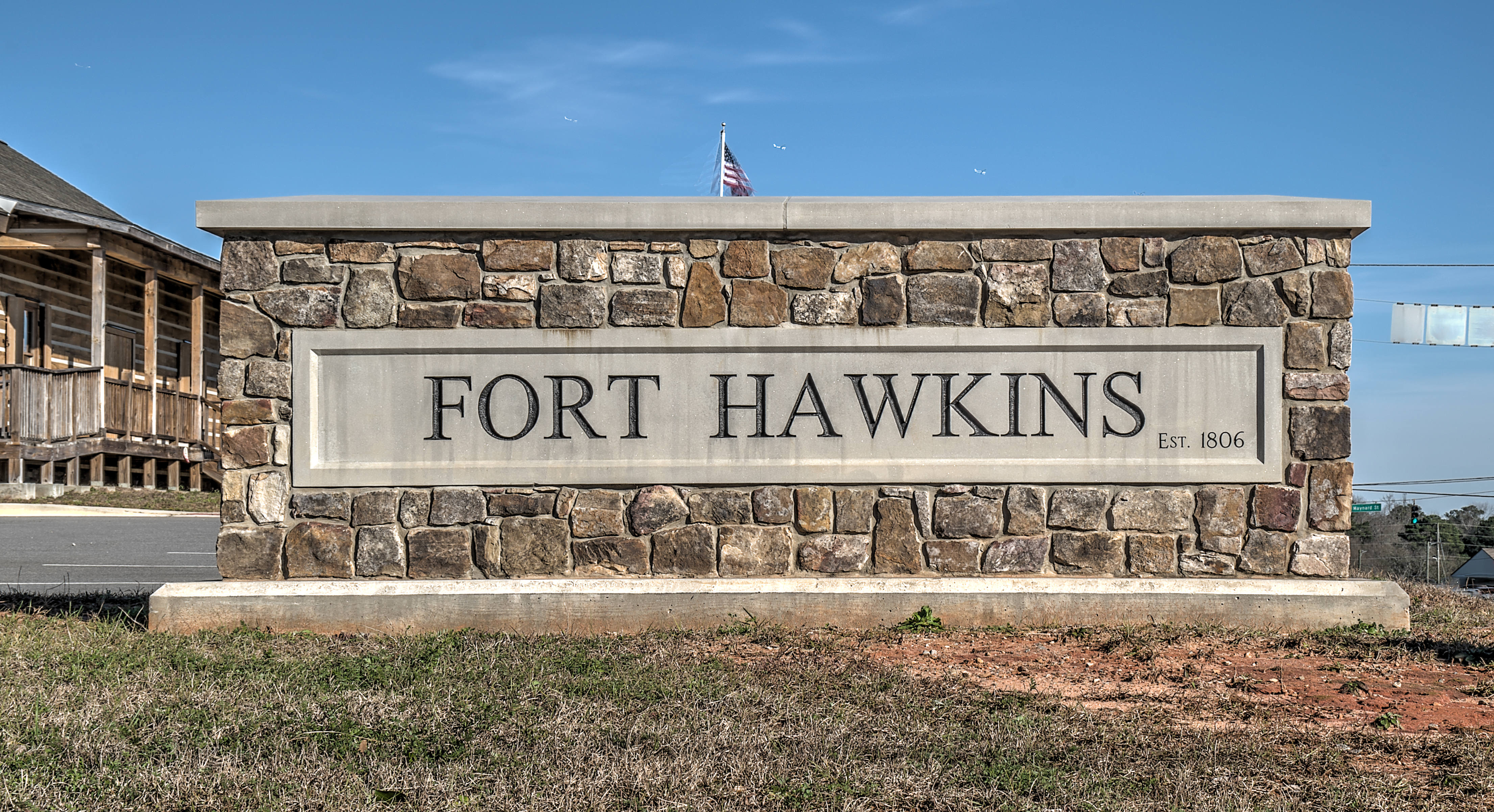
entrance sign

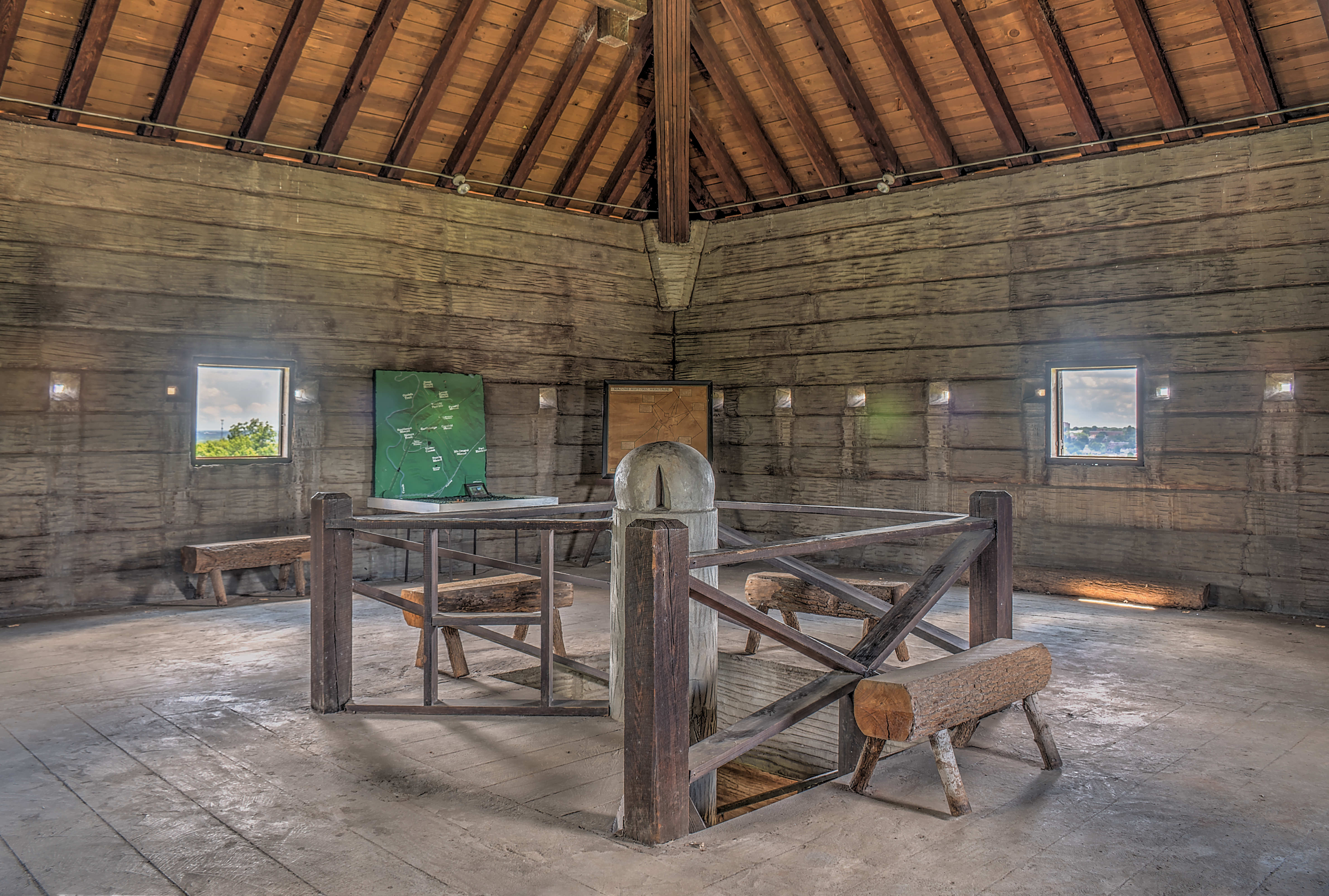
upper level of fort blockhouse

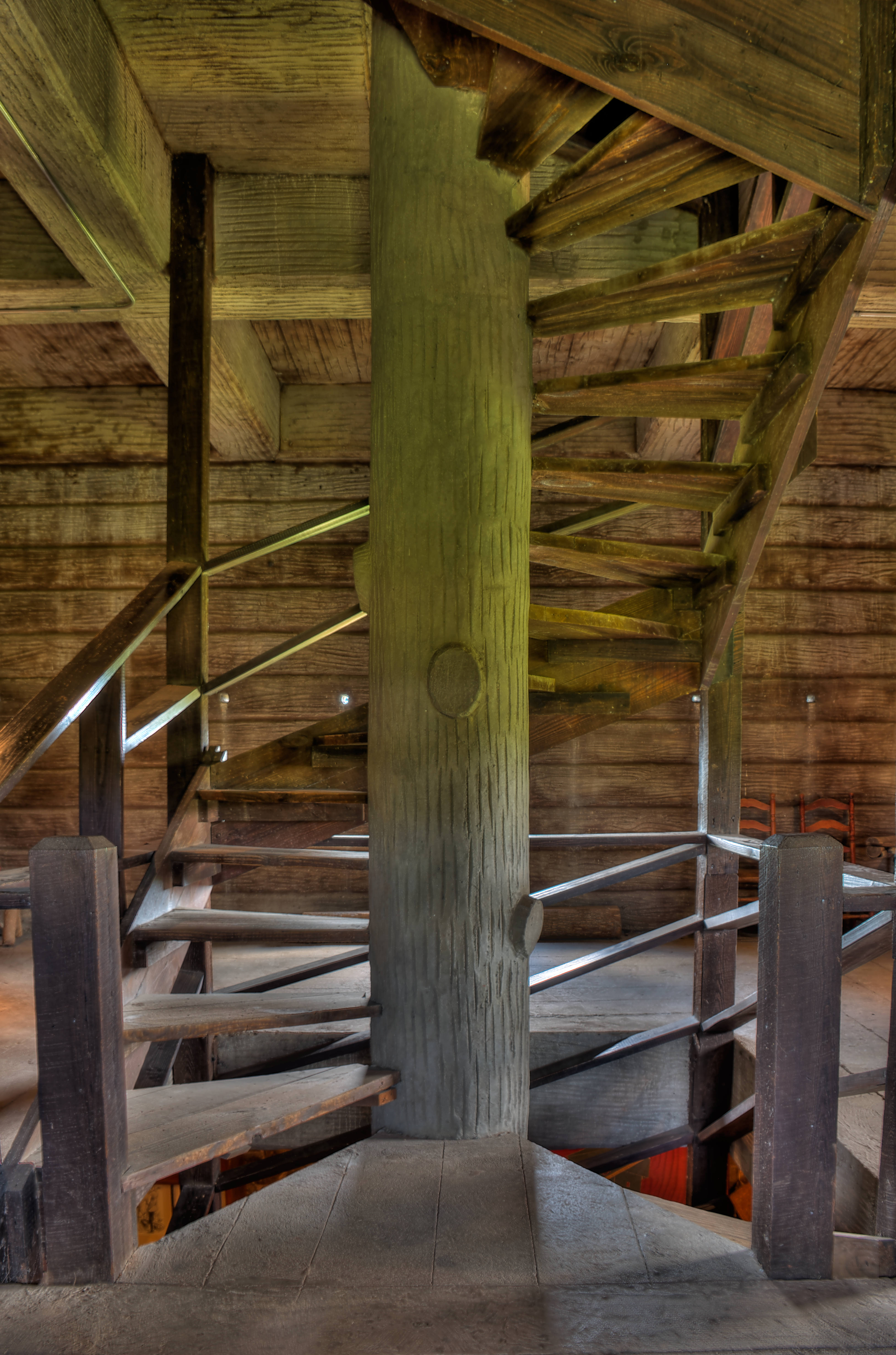
middle level of fort blockhouse

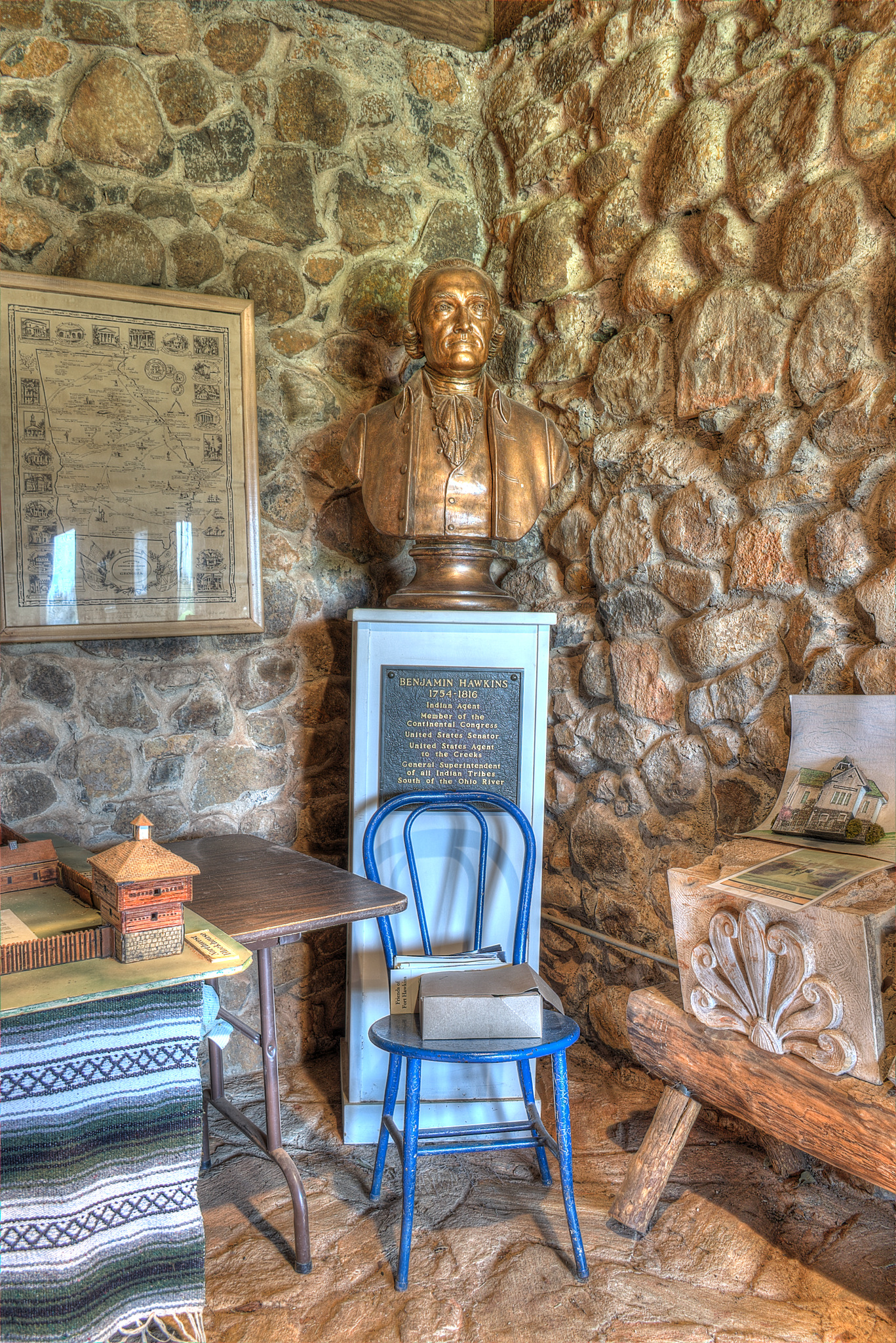
bust of Benjamin Hawkins

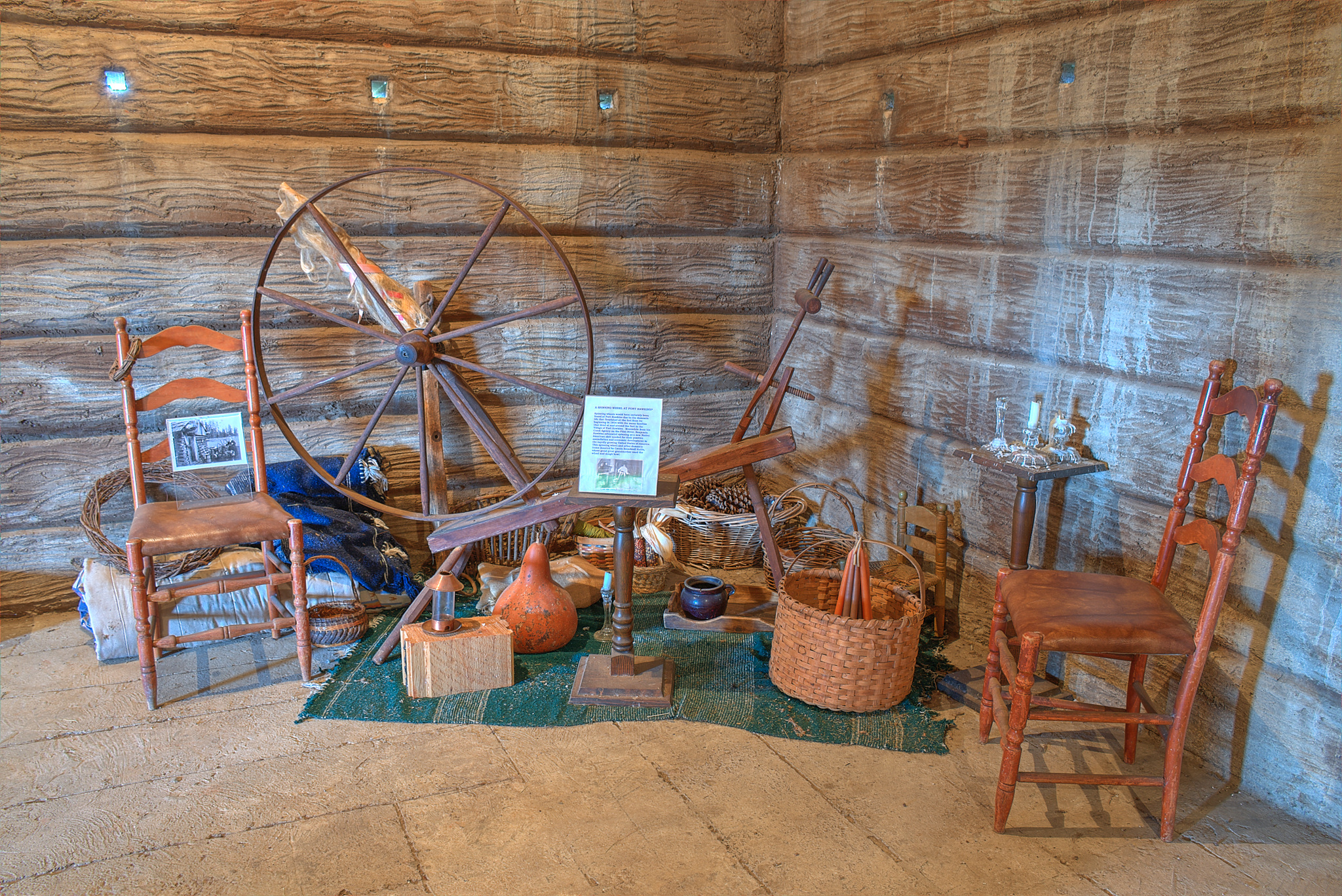
spinning wheel
