= United States five-thousand-dollar bill =

Denomination of US currency

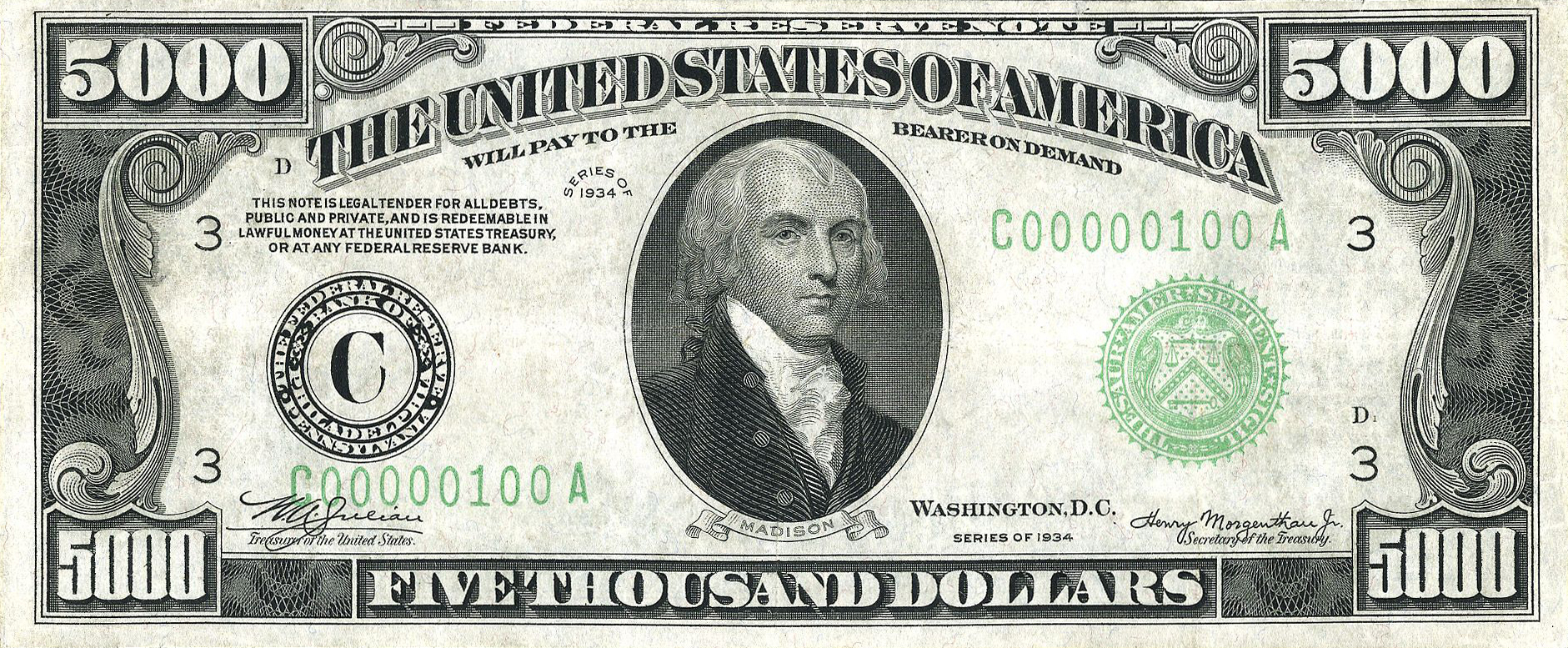
1934 US 5000-dollar bill

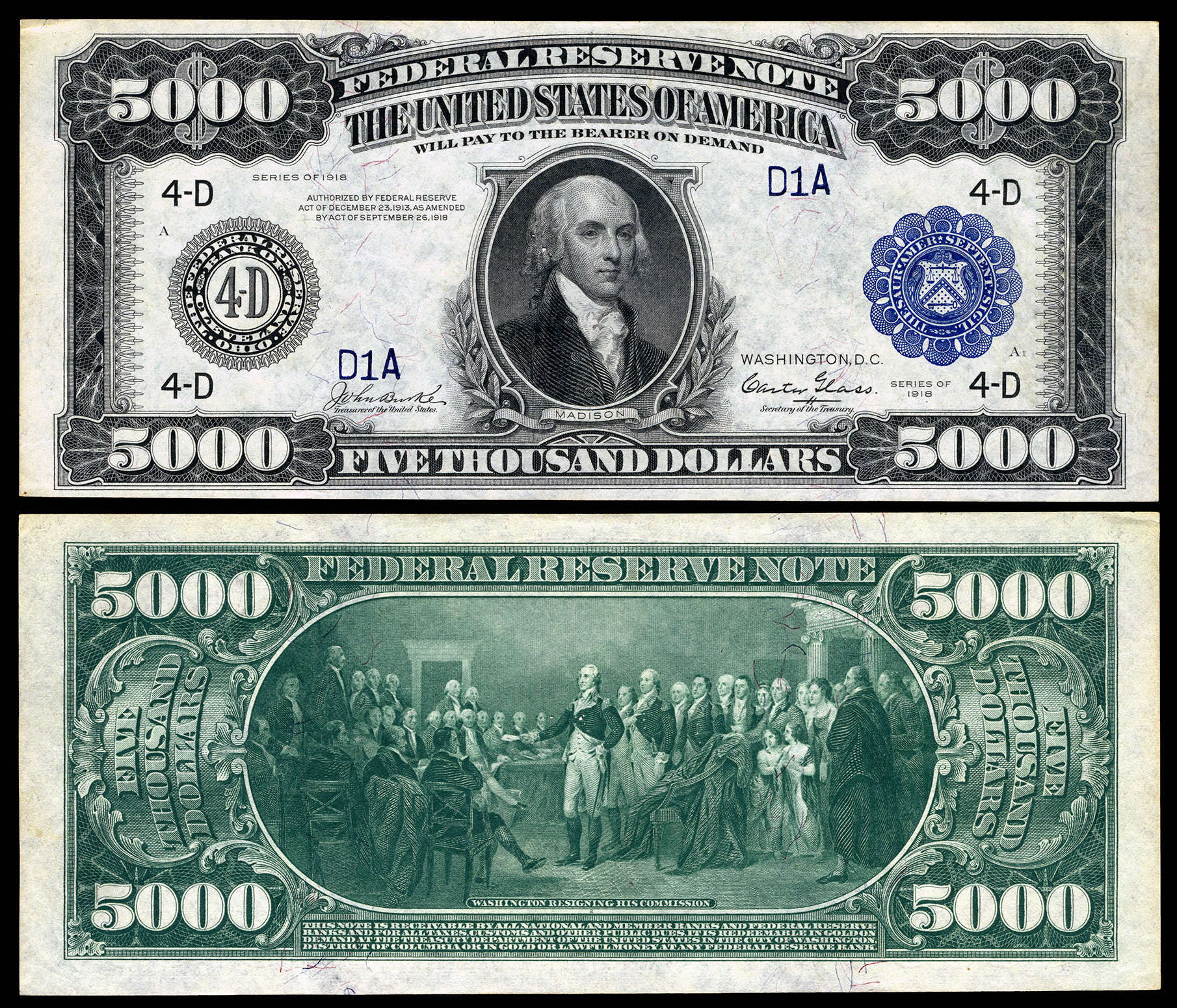
Design of the U.S. 5000-dollar bill from 1918, the reverse features John Trumbull's 1824 painting General George Washington Resigning His Commission

The United States 5000-dollar bill (US$5000) is an obsolete denomination of United States currency. The note's obverse features president James Madison and the reverse includes John Trumbull's 1824 painting General George Washington Resigning His Commission. It is still legal tender. The United States Department of the Treasury discontinued the note $5000 bill in 1969 and it is now valued by currency collectors.

== History ==
The United States five-thousand-dollar bill was printed from 1861 to 1945. The Bureau of Engraving and Printing continued to issue the notes until 1969. The notes did not see much circulation among the public because they were printed to facilitate transactions between banks. On July 14, 1969, the United States Department of the Treasury announced that all notes in denominations greater than US$100 would be discontinued. Since 1969, banks have been required to send any $5000 bill to the Department of the Treasury for destruction.

Examples of the note have become valuable among collectors. In 2024, a graded example of a $5000 bill sold at auction for $144,000. In 2023, an example of the $5,000 Federal Reserve Note sold at Heritage Auctions for $300,000.
