= Battle of Calebee Creek =

Battle fought during the Creek War

Coordinates: 32°24′19.15″N 85°42′17.54″W

- Part of the Creek War
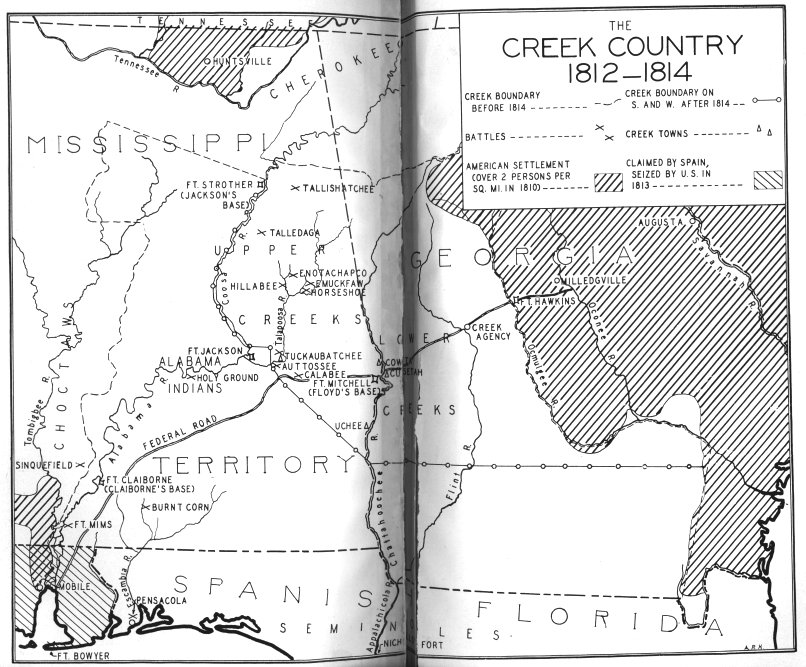
- Fort Mitchell (Floyd's Base) shown along the Federal Road near Autossee and Calabee
Date	January 27, 1814
Location	In present-day Macon County, Alabama
Result	Tactical stalemate, Americans withdraw

Belligerents
United States	Red Stick Creeks

Commanders and leaders
John Floyd	Paddy Walsh (WIA); William Weatherford

Strength
1,200 Georgia Volunteers; 400 Yuchi Indians	1,300

Casualties and losses
25 killed, 150 wounded	50 killed, unknown wounded

The Battle of Calebee Creek (also spelled Calabee, Callabee, or in the official report at the time, "Chalibee") took place on January 27, 1814, during the Creek War, in Macon County, Alabama, 50 miles (80 km) west of Fort Mitchell. General Floyd, with 1,200 Georgia volunteers, a company of cavalry and 400 friendly Yuchi, repulsed a night attack of the Red Sticks on his camp. Floyd lost so many in this hostile country that he immediately withdrew to the Chattahoochee River. Also referred to as the Battle for Camp Defiance.

== Background ==
After the Red Stick attack on Fort Mims (about 30 miles (48 km) north of Mobile) in August 1813, Georgia, Tennessee, and the Mississippi Territory mobilized troops to put down the Red Stick "rebellion." The force consisted of one company of artillery, one squadron of dragoons, a battalion of riflemen and two regiments of infantry. Newly appointed commander of the group, John Floyd made clear his goal to push his column not rapidly, but resistlessly so as to establish a permanent wedge Creek country. However, his inability to procure supplies to feed his troops from state bureaucrats greatly hindered his efforts toward this objective. In the end, two offensives were launched into Creek territory in today-eastern Alabama, the first of which resulted in the Battle of Autossee in November 1813, where 900 of his men killed 200 natives and burned the town to ashes. After regrouping for two months at Fort Mitchell (Floyd himself had been seriously wounded at the knee), Floyd and a force of 1,700 militia and allied Creek warriors headed 40 miles (64 km) west to build two supply stations at Forts Hull and Bainbridge along the Federal Road.

At about the same time, Andrew Jackson was marching a force of just over 400 men (Lower Creek and Cherokee included) toward the Creek village of Emuckfaw in an effort to create a diversion in favor of Floyd. However, with raw, newly recruited militia in tow at the Battles of Emuckfaw and Enotachopo Creek, Jackson only managed to kill 50 Creek while his troop suffered relatively heavy casualties and was forced to retreat thereafter. In spite of these events, Jackson's account claimed his operations had still tended thus to assist Floyd.

== Battle ==
Paddy Walsh and William Weatherford (Red Eagle) were aware of Floyd's approach, gathering 1,800 Creek warriors at a council in preparation to repel the invaders. However, the two couldn't agree on how to counter. Weatherford wished to wait for Floyd's men to cross the Calabee first, using the surprise attack to rush officers' tents first but his plan was ruled out as too risky. Because of this, Walsh ultimately led the attack without Weatherford with the objectives of overcoming the sentries, killing as many as possible and retreating at daylight.

At the break of dawn on January 27, 1814, 1,300 Creek successfully sneaked past surrounding campfires where they fell on Floyd and his militia from three sides after having lain concealed in the swamps until half after five. As the siege raged on leaving many without weapons or ammunition, accounts tell of artilleryman Ezekiel M. Attaway (under the command of Jett Thomas), who grabbed the traversing handspike from the carriage of his gun and shouted, "We must not give up the gun, boys. Seize the first weapon you can lay your hands upon, and stick to your post until the last." The cannoneers, within yards of losing their key field pieces, were able to break the spirit of the encroaching Creek after firing several grapeshots. Thanks to this quick action which salvaged the artillery and that of Timpoochee Barnard to rescue a group led by Captain John H. Broadnax cut off from the main force, after a week's pause, Floyd was able to defend until break of day, when he ordered a countercharge with bayonet.

== Aftermath ==
Altogether, the carnage lasted an hour or so. Battered, Floyd marched his forces back to Forts Hull then Mitchell and eventually Georgia. Casualties amounted to approximately 50 Red Sticks dead, Chief High Head Jim among them. Paddy Walsh was also seriously injured. Meanwhile, 25 militiamen and allied Indians perished, including Captain Samuel Butts, and 150 were wounded. Accounts differ, although the general consensus is that, while the Creek may have lost more men, Floyd had the worst of the affair.

Red Sticks began to concentrate their forces in a heavily fortified area on the Tallapoosa River, 40 miles (64 km) north of Autossee, setting the stage for the decisive Battle of Horseshoe Bend.

== Legacy ==
The battlefield currently lies on private land in Macon County at the confluence of Calebee Creek and Tallapoosa River. There is currently no upkeep of the site nor marker commemorating the events.

== See also ==
- Attacks on the United States
