= Milstead, Alabama =

Unincorporated community in Alabama, United States

- Unincorporated community
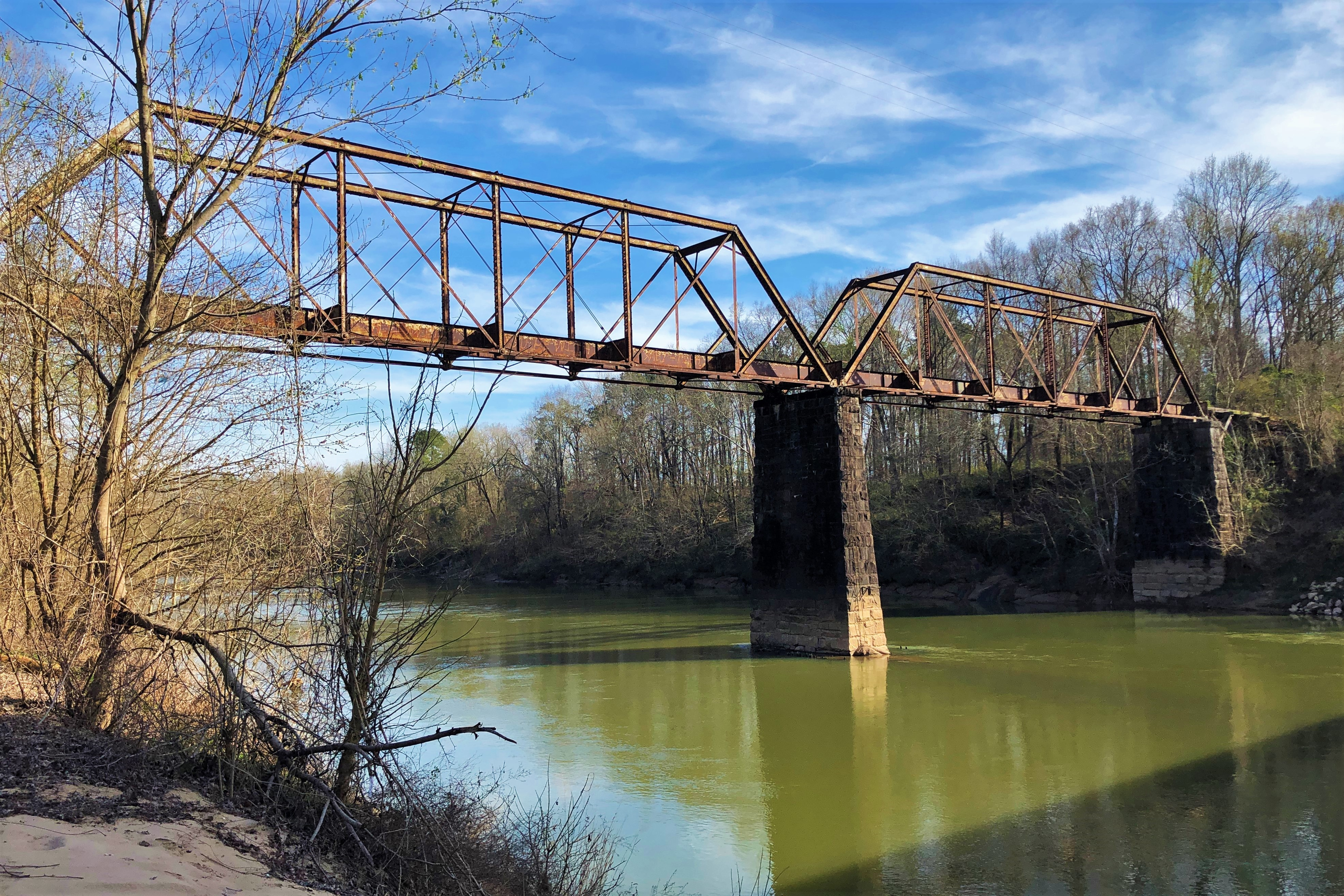
- The abandoned two-span Tallapoosa River Railroad Bridge in Milstead was part of the Tallassee and Montgomery Railway.

- Location in Alabama Location in the United States
- Coordinates: 32°26′33″N 85°53′51″W
- Country: United States
- State: Alabama
- County: Macon
- Elevation: 207 ft (63 m)
- Time zone: UTC-6 (Central (CST))
  - Summer (DST): UTC-5 (CDT)
- Area code: 334
- GNIS feature ID: 156715

Milstead, also known as Cowles or Cowles Station, is an unincorporated community in Macon County, Alabama, United States.

== History ==
The community was named after the location where a gristmill once stood by the Tallapoosa River. Milstead was located at the junction of the Tallassee and Montgomery Railway and the Western Railway of Alabama.

Fort Decatur, a fort built during the Creek War, was located near Milstead. John Sevier died here while conducting a survey of Creek lands.

A post office operated under the name Cowle's Station from 1867 to 1895, under the name Cowles from 1895 to 1896, and under the name Milstead from 1896 to 1964.

Auburn University maintains the E.V. Smith Research Center in Milstead.

== Gallery ==
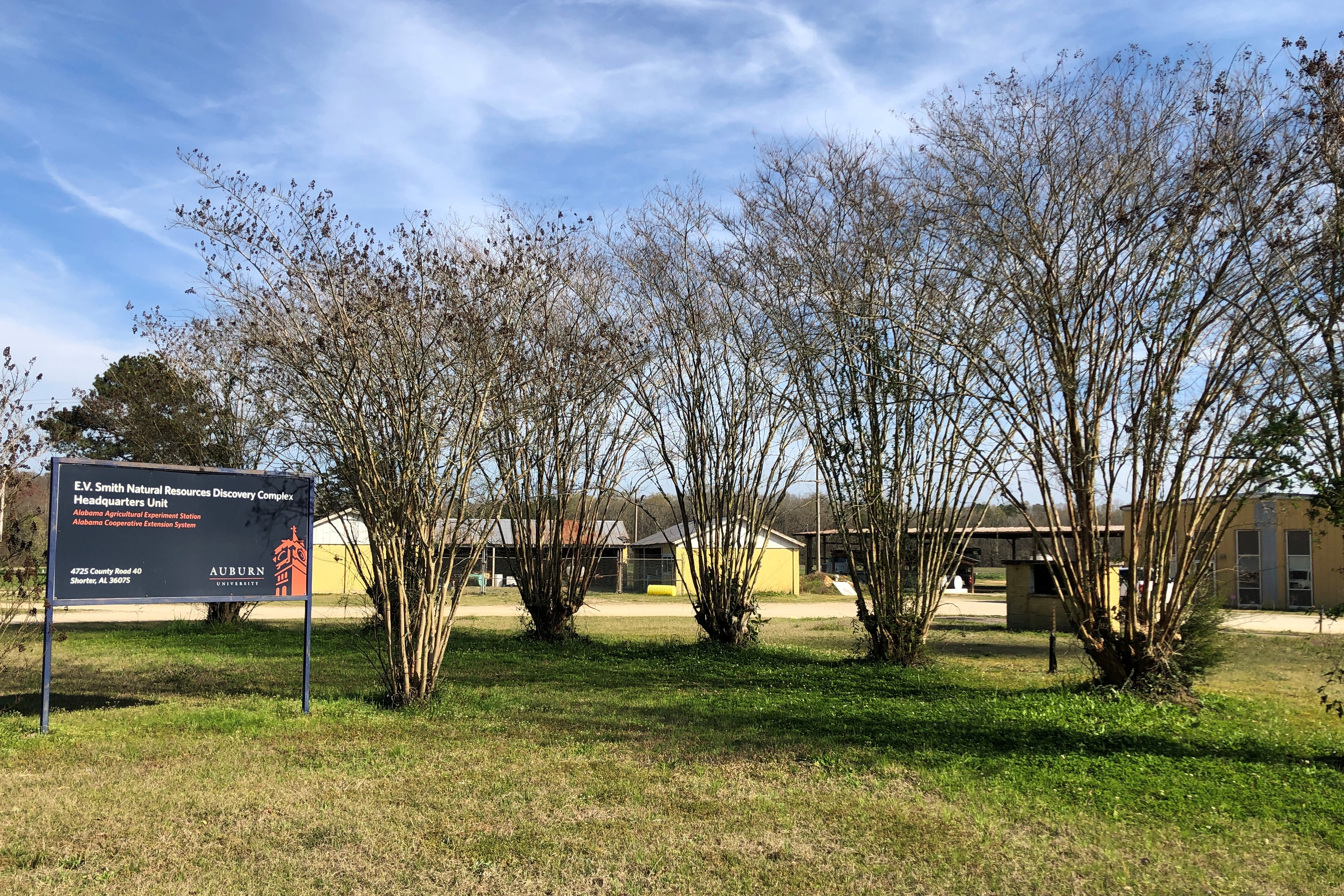
Auburn University's E.V. Smith Research Center is located in Milstead.

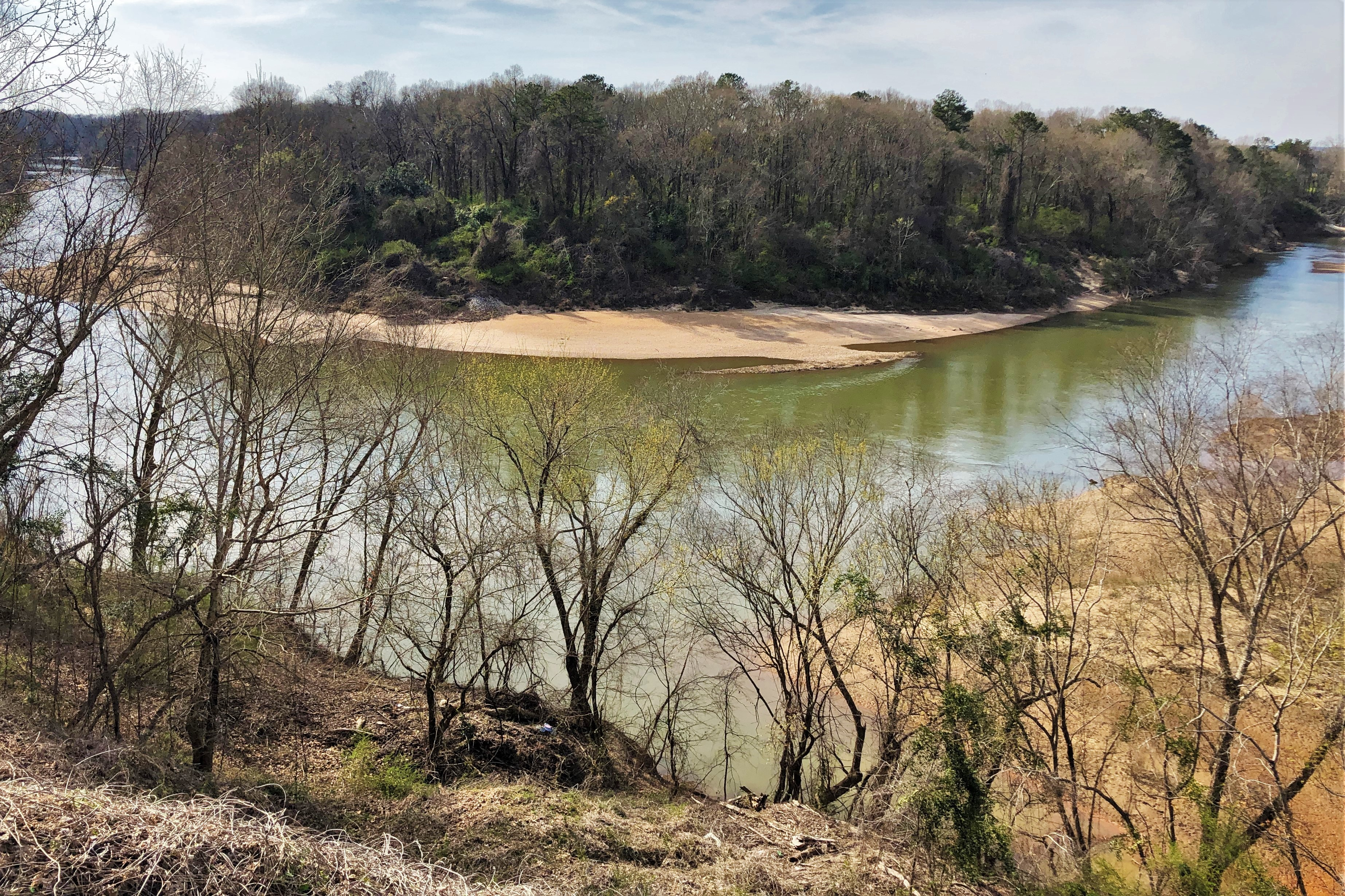
The Tallapoosa River at Milstead

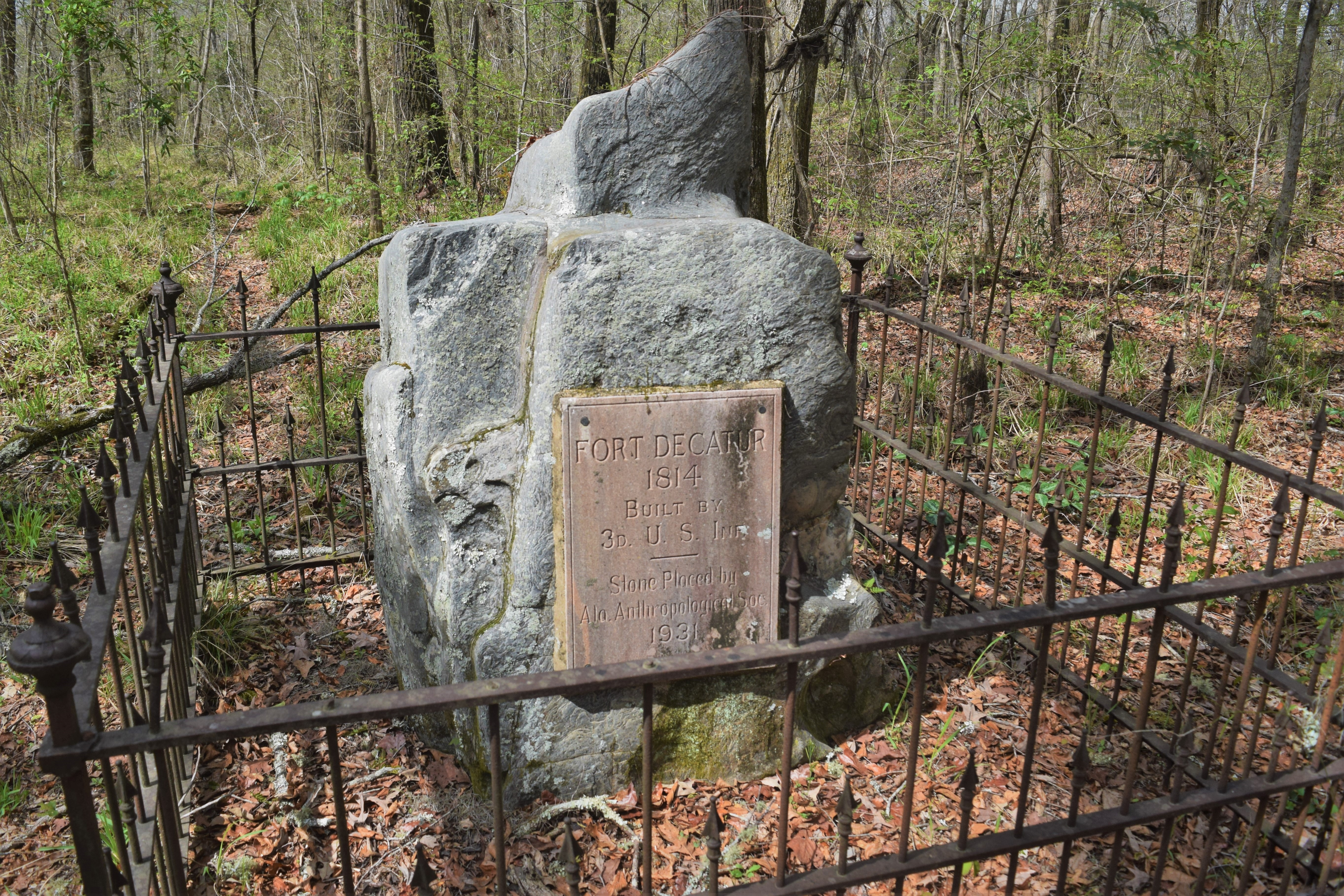
The site of Fort Decatur, an earthen fort established in March 1814 as part of the Creek War and the larger War of 1812, is located on the banks of the Tallapoosa River near modern-day Milstead. Today, the fort site is marked by a historical marker (pictured) that was placed by the Alabama Anthropological Society in 1931.
