= Timpoochee Barnard =

Yuchi chief (c. 1783– c. 1841)

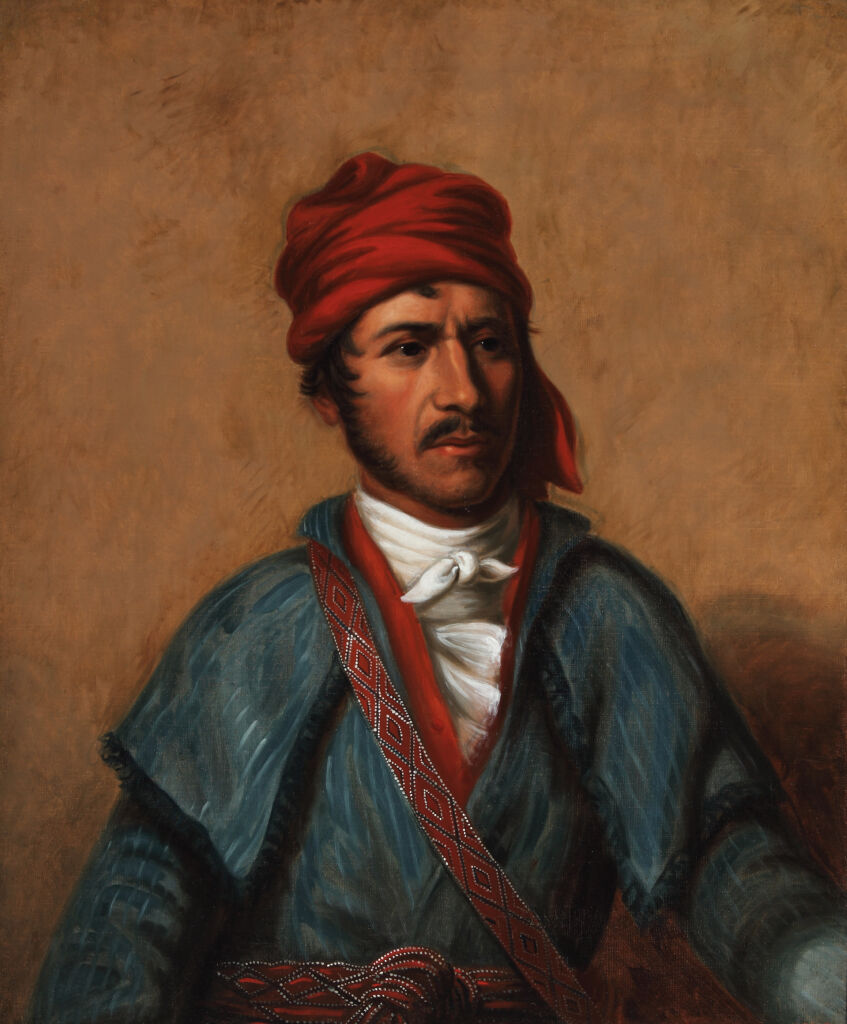
Timpoochee Barnard, painted by Henry Inman, c. 1831–1834

Timpoochee Barnard (c. 1783 – c. 1841) was the chief of the Yuchi people, a constituent tribe of the Creek Nation, and served as a member of the Creek National Council. During the Creek War, he supported the actions of the Creek National Council and raised a regiment of Yuchis who materially assisted in the American defeat of the Red Stick faction during the war. He is most notable for rescuing part of General John Floyd’s Georgia militia at the Battle of Calabee Creek in January 1814. Barnard, who was severely wounded in the action, was hailed for his bravery. As president, Andrew Jackson would greet Barnard’s son by noting "A braver man than your father never lived."

Barnard, whose title was listed as "Captain of Uchees," signed the Treaty of Fort Jackson on August 9, 1814. He was among the delegation of Creek headmen who protested the 1825 Treaty of Indian Springs, which was overturned. And he signed the Treaty of Washington, 1826, that superseded it. Timpoochee Barnard died at the age of 58, just prior to the forced removal of the Creek Indians from Alabama.

== Family ==
His father was Timothy Barnard, a well-known and highly respected trader to the Creek Nation who also served as interpreter for U. S. agent Benjamin Hawkins.

His son, William, was educated by the American government and also became influential in Creek affairs.
