= Samuel Butts =

U.S. army captain (1777–1814)

- Born: November 24, 1777; Southampton County, Virginia
- Died: January 27, 1814 (aged 36); Macon County, Alabama
- Military career
- Allegiance: United States of America
- Branch: United States Army
- Service years: 1813–1814
- Rank: Captain
- Unit: First Brigade of Georgia Militia
- Conflict: War of 1812; Creek War; Battle of Calebee Creek †

Samuel Butts (November 24, 1777 – January 27, 1814) was an American militia officer who served in the Creek War.

Butts was born at his family's farm in Southampton County, Virginia, to parents Martha and Simmons. His ancestors included many veterans of the American Revolutionary War. The Butts family moved to Sparta, Georgia, when Samuel was young.

As an adult, Butts moved to Monticello, Georgia, and became a businessman. In 1813, Butts joined the local militia of Jasper County as a private in order to fight in the War of 1812. He was quickly made captain of his unit, and they fought under the command of General John Floyd in battles at Autossee, Tallasee and Camp Defiance. On January 27, 1814, Butts was killed in Alabama at the Battle of Calebee Creek (referred to as Chillabee in some sources), having been shot through the abdomen.

In 1825, the Georgia General Assembly named Butts County, Georgia in honor of Captain Butts. A Georgia chapter of the Sons of the American Revolution is named after him as well.
