= Fort Decatur (Alabama) =

United States historic site

- Milstead, Alabama in United States
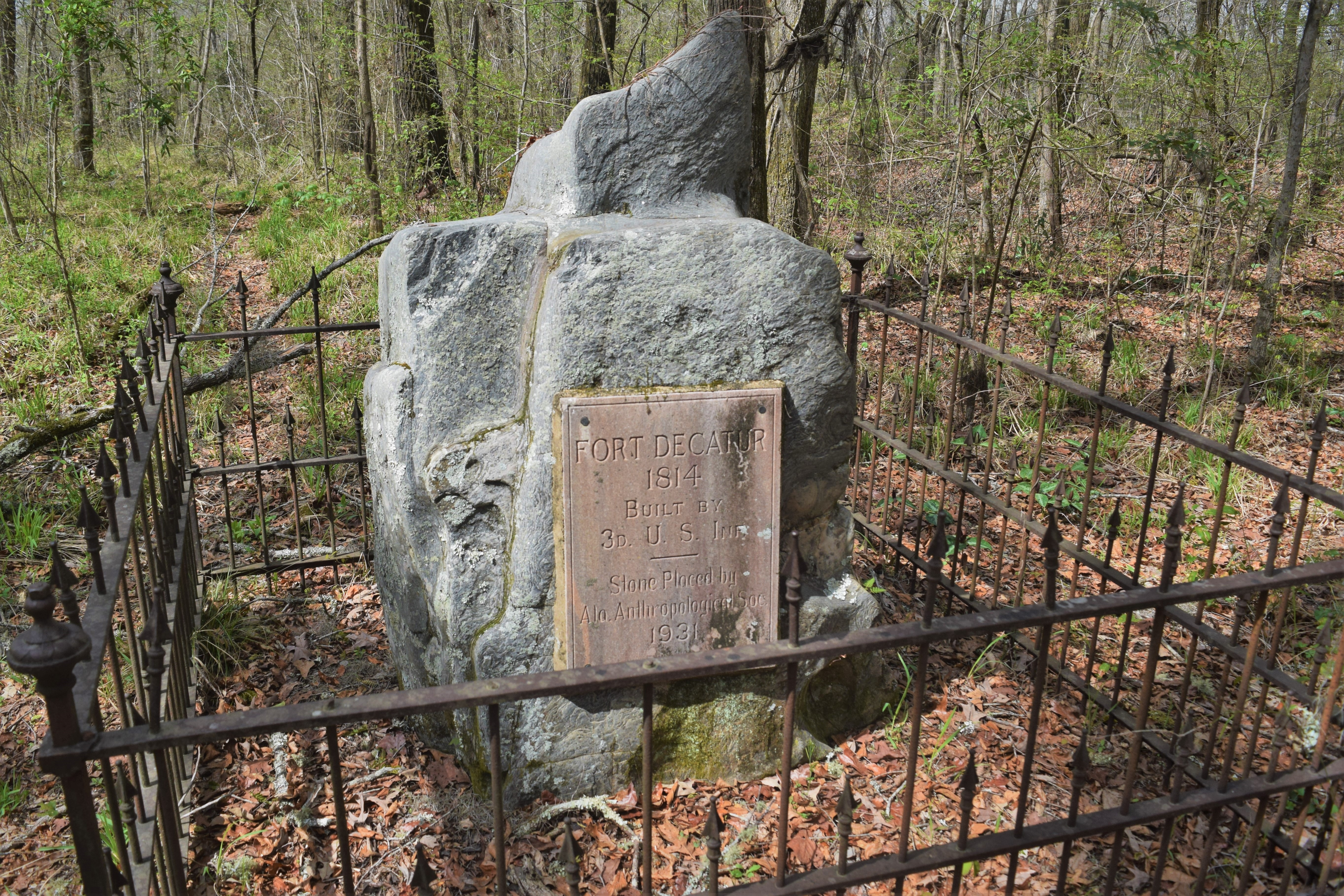
- Marker placed at the site of Fort Decatur by the Alabama Anthropological Society in 1931.

Site information
- Type: Earthen fort
- Owner: Auburn University
- Controlled by: Auburn University
- Open to the public: No

Location
- Location within Alabama Location within the United States
- Coordinates: 32°26′49.9″N 85°53′05.0″W

Site history
- Built: March 1814
- Built by: United States Army
- In use: 1814
- Battles/wars: Creek War
- Events: Death of John Sevier

Fort Decatur was an earthen fort established in March 1814 on the banks of the Tallapoosa River as part of the Creek War and the larger War of 1812. The fort was located on the east bank of the Tallapoosa River, near the modern community of Milstead. Fort Decatur was also located near the Creek town of Tukabatchee. It was most likely named for Stephen Decatur.

== History ==
=== Creek War ===
Colonel Homer Milton, the commanding officer of the 3rd Regiment, ordered the construction of Fort Decatur and Fort Burrows after leaving Fort Hull in March 1814. Fort Burrows was located across the Tallapoosa River from Fort Decatur. Benjamin Hawkins assisted Milton in surveying the site of Fort Decatur. The fort was built under the command of Lieutenant Colonel Richard Atkinson. After pursuing Red Sticks in southeast Alabama, Davy Crockett (a member of Major William Russell's Tennessee Mounted Volunteers) was stationed at Fort Decatur. Fort Decatur was planned to supply General Andrew Jackson in his march from Fort Williams to Hickory Ground, but flooding prevented the supplies from arriving. After the Battle of Horseshoe Bend, Georgia and South Carolina troops under the command of Major General Thomas Pinckney marched from Fort Decatur to Fort Jackson. Brigadier General Joseph Graham commanded troops at Fort Decatur who repaired roads and assisted in supplying Jackson's army after the Battle of Horseshoe Bend. After regular troops terms of service were up, the Tennessee militia was garrisoned at Fort Decatur. The militia was then replaced by troops from Georgia who were requested by General Pinckney to oppose any potential British or Creek offensive.

William McIntosh and Thomas Simpson Woodward were both temporarily stationed at Fort Decatur.

=== Postwar ===
In 1815, President James Madison appointed Colonel John Sevier to the United States Boundary Commission to survey the boundary between the United States and the Creek Nation. The commission was headquartered at Fort Decatur. On September 24, 1815, Sevier died and was buried at Fort Decatur. Sevier's remains were reinterred at the Knox County Courthouse in Knoxville on June 15, 1889.

A post office operated under the name Fort Decatur from 1839 to 1859.

=== Present ===
Today, the fort site is marked by a historical marker that was placed by the Alabama Anthropological Society in 1931. The remains of the fort are located on the grounds of Auburn University's E.V. Smith Research Center.

== Units ==
The 4th Regiment of East Tennessee Militia and a battalion of West Tennessee Militia were both stationed at Fort Decatur. The 7th North Carolina Militia was garrisoned at Fort Burrows and Fort Decatur.

== Gallery ==
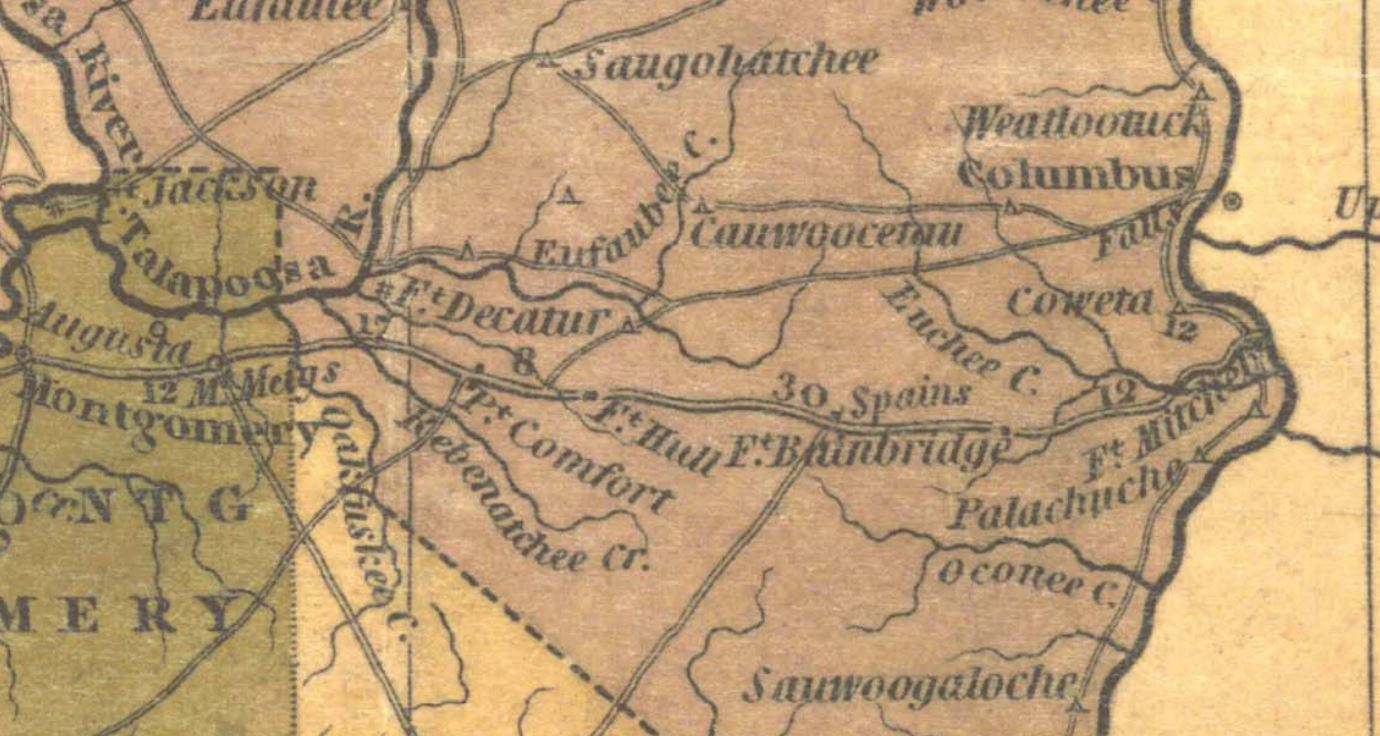
Fort Decatur (located in the center) as portrayed in Henry Schenck Tanner's 1830 The Traveler's Pocket Map of Alabama.

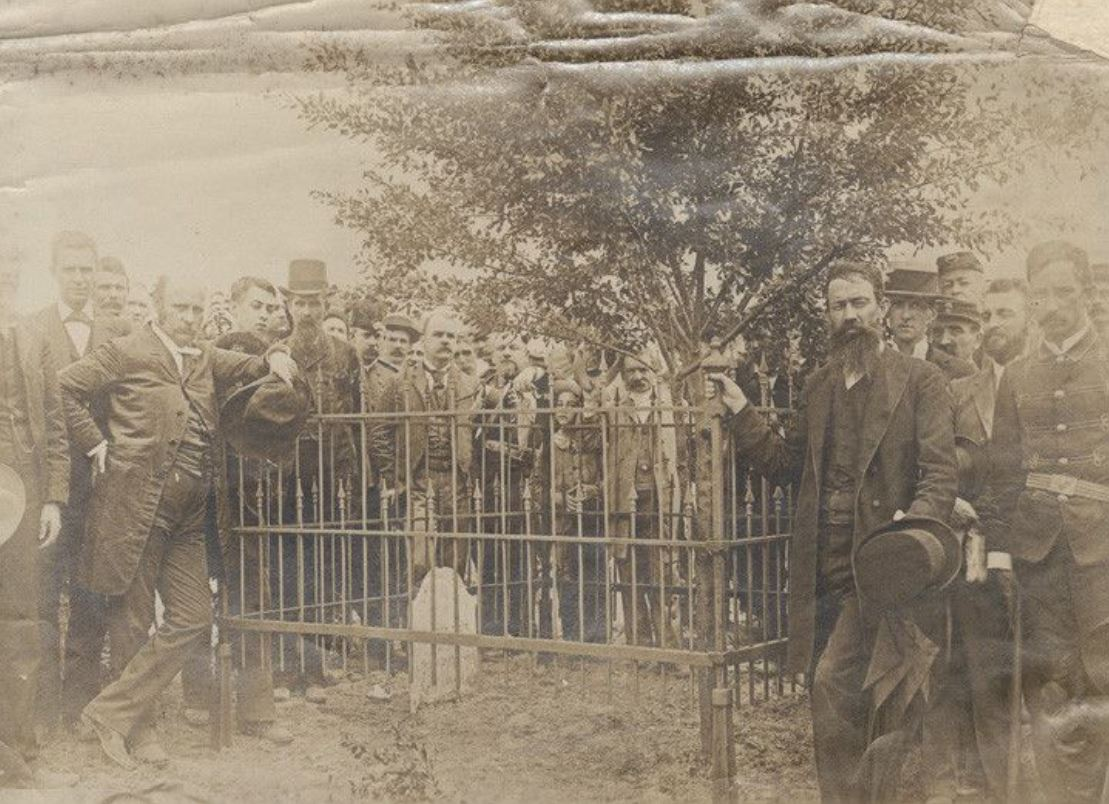
1889 photograph of John Sevier's original grave at Fort Decatur prior to disinterment. Tennessee governor Robert Love Taylor is leaning on the left corner of the fence and Alabama governor Thomas Seay is leaning on the right corner.

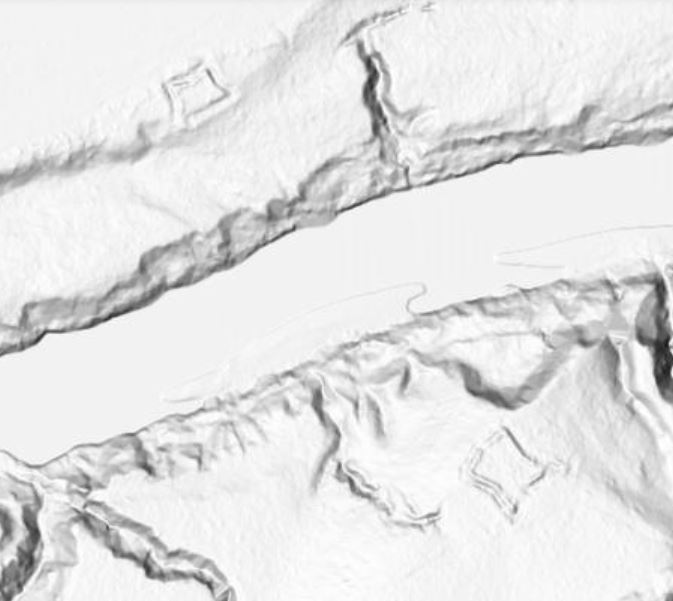
2017 LiDAR hillshade of Fort Decatur (in the lower right) and Fort Burrows (upper left), with the Tallapoosa River in the center of the image.

== Sources ==
- Brown, William Garrott (1900). A History of Alabama, for Use in Schools: Based as to Its Earlier Parts on the Work of Albert J. Pickett. New York, New York: University Publishing Company. ISBN 9781172237579.
- Bunn, Mike; Williams, Clay (2008). Battle for the Southern Frontier: The Creek War and the War of 1812. Charleston, South Carolina: The History Press. ISBN 978-1-62584-381-4.
- Hannings, Bud (2012). The War of 1812: A Complete Chronology with Biographies of 63 General Officers. Jefferson, North Carolina: McFarland. ISBN 978-0-7864-6385-5.
- Harris, W. Stuart (1977). Dead Towns of Alabama. Tuscaloosa, Alabama: University of Alabama Press. ISBN 0-8173-1125-4.
- Jackson, Andrew (1927) [Composed 10 August 1814]. Bassett, John Spencer (ed.). Correspondence of Andrew Jackson. Vol. 2. Washington, D.C.: Carnegie Institution of Washington.
- Jones, Randell (2006). In the Footsteps of Davy Crockett. Winston-Salem, North Carolina: John F. Blair. ISBN 978-0-89587-324-8.
- Owsley, Frank Lawrence (2008). Struggle for the Gulf Borderlands. Gainesville, Florida: Library Press@UF. ISBN 978-1-947372-34-4.
- Pinckney, Thomas (1926) [Composed 14 April 1814]. Bassett, John Spencer (ed.). Correspondence of Andrew Jackson. Vol. 1. Washington, D.C.: Carnegie Institution of Washington.
- Waselkov, Gregory; Christopher, Raven (April 2012). Archaeological Survey of the Old Federal Road in Alabama (Technical report). Montgomery, Alabama: Alabama Department of Transportation. "Submitted by the Center for Archaeological Studies University of South Alabama."
- Williams, Samuel Cole (1924). History of the Lost State of Franklin. Johnson City, Tennessee: Watauga Press. ISBN 9780806347400.
