= Boromville, Alabama =

Unincorporated community in Alabama, United States

- Unincorporated community
- Location in Alabama Location in the United States
- Coordinates: 32°18′24″N 85°26′30″W
- Country: United States
- State: Alabama
- County: Macon
- Elevation: 489 ft (149 m)
- Time zone: UTC-6 (Central (CST))
  - Summer (DST): UTC-5 (CDT)
- Area code: 334
- GNIS feature ID: 114743

Boromville, also known as Borom, is an unincorporated community in Macon County, Alabama, United States.

== History ==
The community of Boromville grew up around the site of Fort Bainbridge, which was located on the Federal Road. A post office operated under the name Borom from 1894 to 1917.
