= Battle of Hart's Mill =

1781 battle in the American Revolutionary War

- Part of the American Revolutionary War
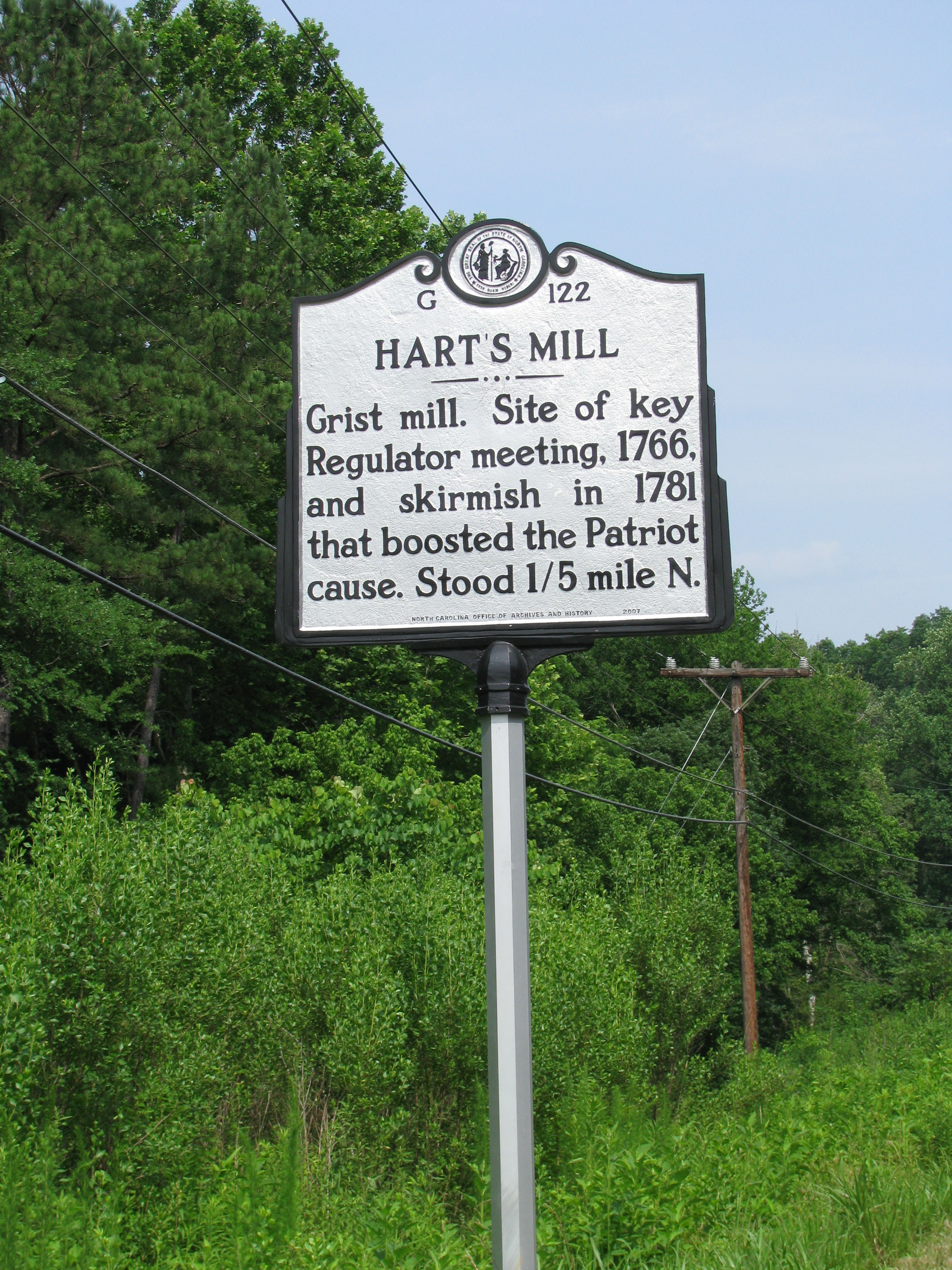
- Grist mill. Site of key Regulator meeting 1766 and skirmish in 1781 that boosted the Patriot cause. Stood 1/5 mile N. 36.083268°N 79.140937°W
Date	February 17, 1781
Location	Near Hillsborough, North Carolina
Result	Patriot victory

Belligerents
Great Britain (Kingdom of Great Britain) Loyalist militia	(United States) Patriot militia

Commanders and leaders
(Kingdom of Great Britain) Bryson Lambert † (Kingdom of Great Britain) Taylor Graham Gooden †	(United States) Joseph Graham (United States) Richard Simmons

Strength
27 - 30.	40

Casualties and losses
9 killed and wounded 5 - 19 captured	None killed Unknown wounded <name="auto1"/>

The Battle of Hart’s Mill took place near Hillsborough, North Carolina between Patriot militia under Joseph Graham and Richard Simmons and a combined force of British and Loyalist militia on February 17, 1781

The Patriot forces returned to North Carolina from Virginia for resupplies and made camp in Orange county. Captain Joseph Graham under Brigadier General Andrew Pickens was sent to scout the area for British/Loyalist activity. The Patriots discovered a small camp of British and Loyalists at Thomas Hart’s Mill near the Eno River. When dawn broke out the next day, Captain Graham and his men charged, took the camp by surprise and made them disperse. The Patriots took no fatal casualties and the British/Loyalists lost nine killed and wounded and five captured.

The Battle was a boost of morale for the Patriot cause and managed to gain the attention of both George Washington and Thomas Jefferson. Today, there is a State Historical Marker with the name of the mill in Orange County.
