= Battle of Raft Swamp =

1781 battle in the American Revolutionary War

- Part of the American Revolutionary War
Date	October 15, 1781
Location	Between present-day Red Springs, North Carolina and Shannon, North Carolina 34°48′25″N 79°08′39″W
Result	Patriot victory

Belligerents
Great Britain (Kingdom of Great Britain) Loyalist militia	(United States) Patriot militia Lumbee

Commanders and leaders
Colonel Duncan Ray; Colonel Archibald McDugald; Colonel Hector "One-Eyed Hector" McNeill ^{[a]}	Gen. Griffith Rutherford; Major Joseph Graham

Strength
200 militia	150 militia

Casualties and losses
16 killed 50 wounded 15 - 20 captured	1 killed
- [a] Hector "Old Hector" McNeil had been killed at the battle of Lindley's Mill, but Hector "One-Eyed Hector" McNeill had been put in his position to conceal the death of the old colonel. Col. Ray thought that if the men though that "Old Hector" was still alive they would continue to stay with his army.

The Battle of Raft Swamp was fought near Red Springs, North Carolina in Robeson County, on October 15, 1781 during the American War of Independence. Raft Swamp was well known for being a refuge for Loyalists during the American Revolution. On October 15, 1781, in the course of Gen. Griffith Rutherford's expedition against Wilmington, the Patriot cavalry vanguard commanded by Maj. Joseph Graham briefly engaged with some mounted Loyalists of Col. Hector "One-Eyed Hector" McNeill on Rockfish Creek. Major Graham's cavalry charged and broke the Loyalist cavalry and led to fierce combat on the narrow causeway, as well as another clash on a second causeway. A series of charges and confused engagements resulted in the Loyalist forces scattering when darkness brought the action to a conclusion with the Patriots occupying the area. This would be the last battle fought in North Carolina. It took place four days before the British surrender at Yorktown. Today, a state historic marker entitled with the name of the swamp denotes the site of the engagement. It reads as follows: "After the Tory victory at McPhaul's Mill, the Whigs routed the Tories near here on Oct. 15, 1781 and broke their resistance in the area."
