= Jett Thomas =

American politician

Member of the Georgia House of Representatives from Clarke County
- In office 1805–1807

Personal details
- Born: May 13, 1776 Culpeper, Colony of Virginia
- Died: January 6, 1817 (aged 40) Washington, Georgia, U.S.

Military service
- Branch/service: Georgia Militia
- Battles/wars: War of 1812

Jett Thomas (May 13, 1776 – January 6, 1817) was an American military officer, politician, and builder who served as a member of the Georgia House of Representatives and participated in the early construction of the University of Georgia.

== Early life ==
Jett Thomas was born in Culpeper, Virginia and moved with his family to Oglethorpe County, Georgia in 1784.

== Career ==
Thomas represented Clarke County, Georgia in the Georgia House of Representatives from 1805 to 1807. He fought in the War of 1812 under Brigadier General John Floyd in the First Brigade of Georgia Militia. In March 1814, Thomas led the construction of Fort Bainbridge and Fort Hull on the Federal Road. Thomas led the Baldwin Volunteer Artillery company from Milledgeville, Georgia and was commissioned in November 1816 as a Major General in the Georgia Militia, 3rd Division, for his service in the war.

Thomas built the Franklin College of Arts and Sciences, the first permanent building and school at the University of Georgia campus in Athens, Georgia. The college building was designed from the same plans as Connecticut Hall at Yale University, the alma mater of UGA's first president, Josiah Meigs. The UGA building is now known as Old College. In 1807, Jett and John B. Scott built the Old State Capitol in Milledgeville, Georgia, which was the capital of Georgia from 1807 to 1868, and that building later housed the Georgia Military College.

== Death ==
Jett Thomas died at the age of 40 from cancer of the mouth in Washington, Georgia. He was buried in Milledgeville.

=== Legacy ===
In 1825, the Georgia General Assembly named Thomas County, Georgia in his honor. The county seat of that county, Thomasville, was also named after General Thomas the following year, and in 1825 the city of Thomaston, Georgia was named after General Thomas.
