= Tallassee and Montgomery Railway =

The Tallassee and Montgomery Railway was a railroad which operated between a connection with the Western Railway of Alabama at Milstead and the Tallapoosa River textile mill town of Tallassee, Alabama in the late 19th and early 20th centuries. The railroad was built by the owners of the Tallassee Falls Manufacturing Company to transport the company's products to markets. Construction began in 1895 and the line began operation on February 6, 1896. In 1912 the Tallassee and Montgomery was purchased by the Union Springs and Northern Railway to become part of the Birmingham and Southeastern Railway system.

The Tallassee and Montgomery Railway through truss bridge over the Tallapoosa River near Milstead still stands and is easily visible from State Route 229 just north of I-85 exit 26.

== See also ==
- List of defunct Alabama railroads
