= Fort Bainbridge =

United States historic site in Alabama

- Boromville, Alabama in United States
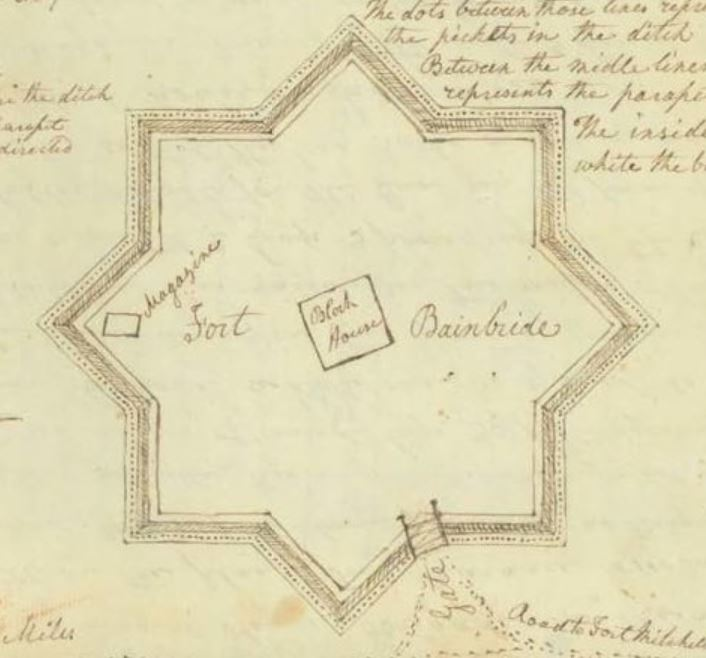

Site information
- Type: Earthen fort
- Owner: Private
- Controlled by: Private
- Open to the public: No

Location
- Location within Alabama Location within the United States
- Coordinates: 32°19′08″N 85°26′06″W

Site history
- Built: March 1814
- Built by: North Carolina militia
- In use: 1814
- Battles/wars: Creek War

Fort Bainbridge was an earthen fort located along the Federal Road on what is today the county line between Macon and Russell counties in Alabama. Fort Bainbridge was located twenty-five miles west of Fort Mitchell.

== History ==
=== Creek War ===
Fort Bainbridge was named in honor of naval captain William Bainbridge. Fort Bainbridge was built in the style of a bastion fort with eight outcroppings. The bastions were surrounded by a ditch that was filled with pickets and the fort was entered by a drawbridge. It was constructed in March 1814 by North Carolina militia under the command of General Joseph Graham in an effort to protect the supply route from Fort Hull to Fort Mitchell. Captain Jett Thomas directed the fort's construction. Fort Bainbridge allowed supply wagons to travel between Fort Mitchell and Hull in one-day intervals and was garrisoned by 100 to 300 troops. Fort Bainbridge was garrisoned by Tennessee militia until July 31, 1814.

=== Postwar ===
In 1820 on his North American tour, Adam Hodgson described Fort Bainbridge as being a "small stockaded mound". Captain Kendall Lewis (who commanded Benjamin Hawkins' scouts), along with his Creek chief father-in law, Big Warrior, operated a tavern as a stagecoach stop about 400 yards west of Fort Bainbridge, which stayed open under the care of Lewis' widow until at least 1836. During his return tour, the Marquis de Lafayette stayed at the Lewis Tavern for his first night in Alabama. Prince Bernhard of Saxe-Weimar-Eisenach stayed at the Lewis Tavern on his 1826 travels through North America. The site of the fort also lies along naturalist William Bartram's four-year journey through the Southern United States, during which he documented the flora, fauna and Native Americans of the area. The fort site was later used as a plantation.

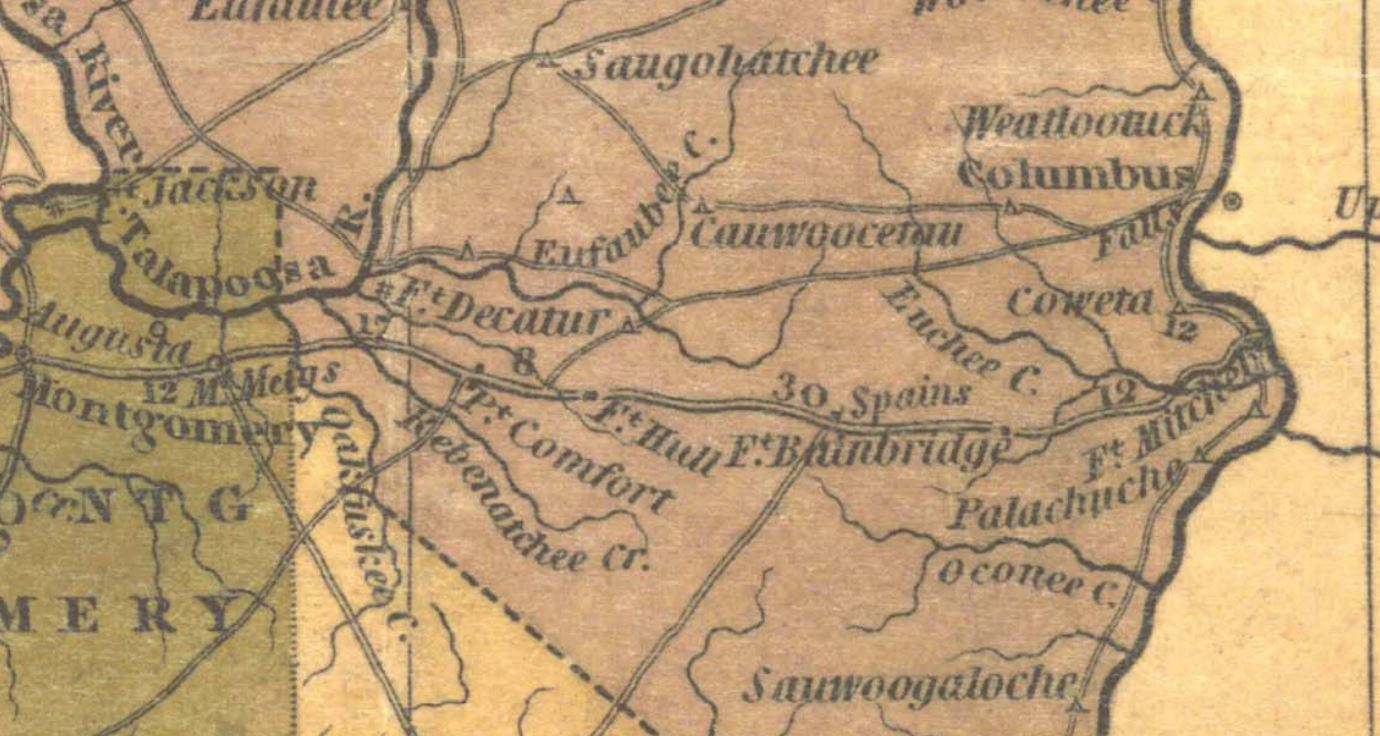
Fort Bainbridge (located in the center) as portrayed in Henry Schenck Tanner's 1830 The Traveler's Pocket Map of Alabama.

=== Present ===
Today, it remains unmarked and its legacy lies in a small unincorporated community, Boromville, that developed from it. Though unmarked, the location is known and the area has been damaged by relic hunters.

== Sources ==
- Bartram Trail Conference (1979). A Study of the Life of William Bartram. Montgomery, Alabama: The Bartram Trail Conference.
- Braund, Kathryn; Waselkov, Gregory; Christopher, Raven (2019). The Old Federal Road in Alabama. Tuscaloosa, Alabama: University of Alabama Press. ISBN 978-0-8173-5930-0.
- Braund, Kathryn E. Holland (2012). Tohopeka: Rethinking the Creek War & the War of 1812. Tuscaloosa, Alabama: University of Alabama Press. ISBN 978-0-8173-5711-5.
- Bunn, Mike; Williams, Clay (2008). Battle for the Southern Frontier: The Creek War and the War of 1812. Charleston, South Carolina: The History Press. ISBN 978-1-62584-381-4.
- Harris, W. Stuart (1977). Dead Towns of Alabama. Tuscaloosa, Alabama: University of Alabama Press. ISBN 0-8173-1125-4.
- Jackson, Andrew (1927) [Composed 31 July 1814]. Bassett, John Spencer (ed.). Correspondence of Andrew Jackson. Vol. 2. Washington, D.C.: Carnegie Institution of Washington.
- Owsley, Frank Lawrence (2008). Struggle for the Gulf Borderlands. Gainesville, Florida: Library Press@UF. ISBN 978-1-947372-34-4.
- Waselkov, Gregory; Christopher, Raven (April 2012). Archaeological Survey of the Old Federal Road in Alabama (Technical report). Montgomery, Alabama: Alabama Department of Transportation. "Submitted by the Center for Archaeological Studies University of South Alabama."
