= Fort Wilkinson =

Fort in Milledgeville, Georgia

Coordinates: 33°2.735′N 83°12.599′W

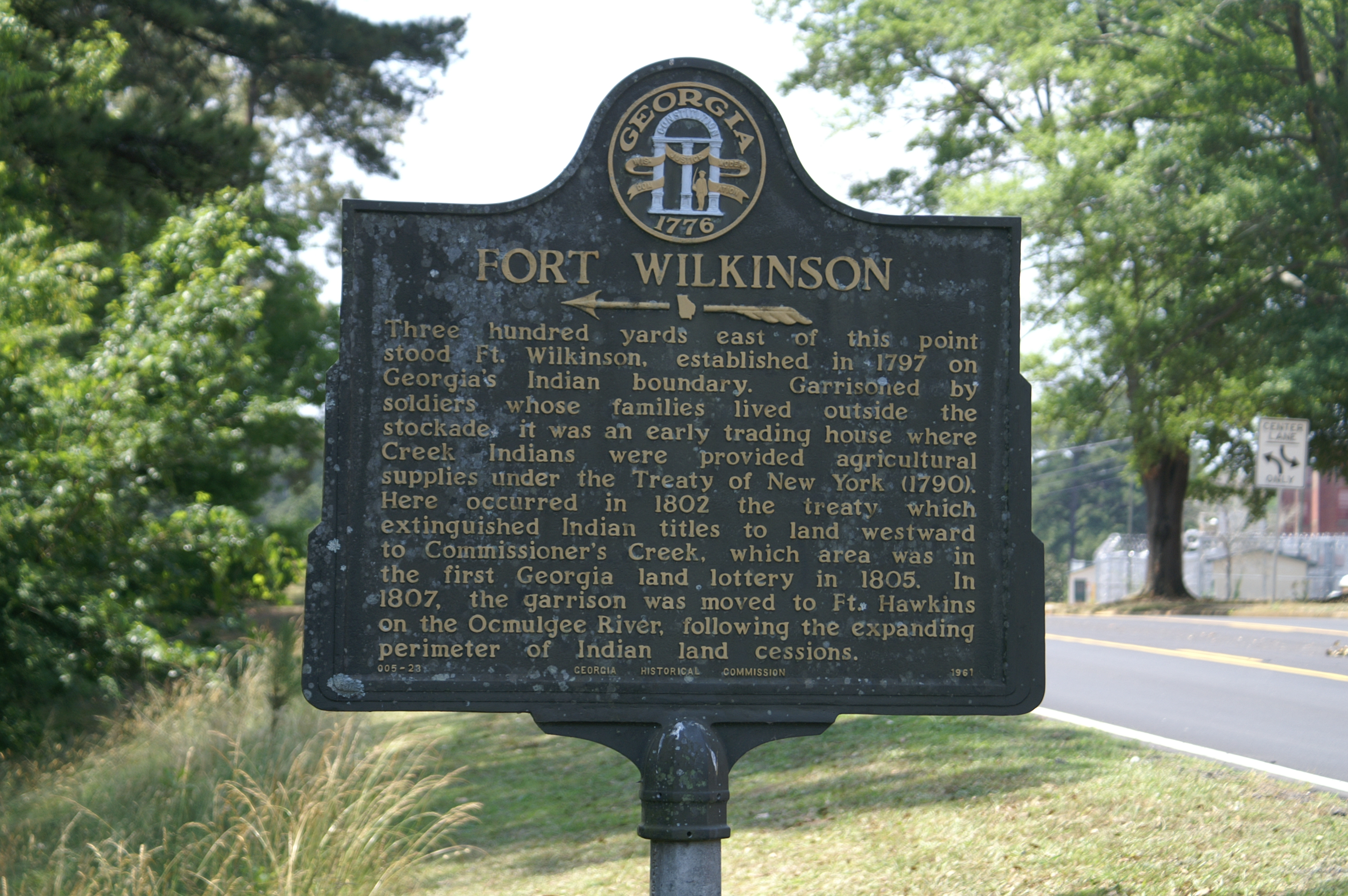
Historical marker for Fort Wilkinson

Fort Wilkinson was a U.S. fort near Milledgeville, Georgia established in 1797 between the Oconee River and the Ocmulgee River. It supplanted Fort Fidius. A historical marker commemorates the site. The fort carried out trading relations with Creek peoples through the United States factory.

The marker is located on Fort Wilkinson Road. The 1802 Treaty of Fort Wilkinson deals with relations with the Creek. The treaty was signed by forty chiefs and warriors on June 16, 1802, and ratified by the United States Senate the following January.

In 1807, the garrison was moved to Ft. Hawkins on the Ocmulgee River.

== See also ==
- Beckom's Mount
