= Joseph Graham (North Carolina soldier) =

Revolutionary soldier and political leader

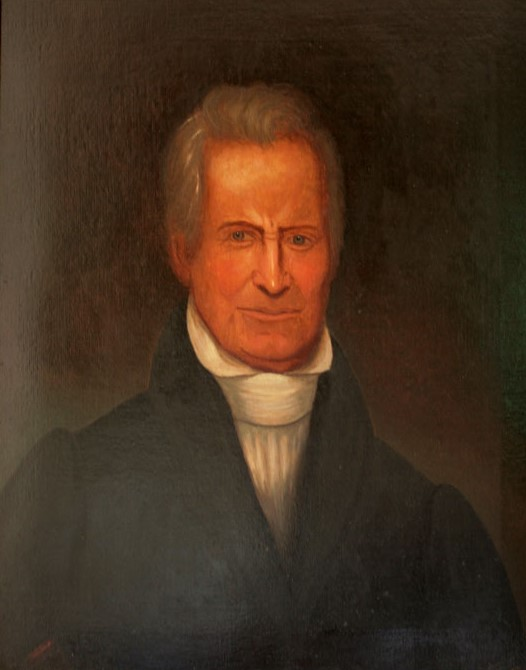
- General Joseph Graham (1759-1836)
- Born: October 13, 1759; Berks County, Pennsylvania
- Died: November 12, 1836 (aged 77); Mecklenburg County, North Carolina
- Spouse: Isabella Davidson Graham (1762-1808)
- Military career
- Allegiance: United States of America
- Branch: North Carolina militia
- Service years: 1781-1783, 1812
- Rank: Major (American Revolution), Brigadier General (War of 1812)
- Units: North Carolina State Legion, Lincoln County Regiment
- Commands: North and South Carolina Militia
- Conflicts: Hart's Mill, Raft Swamp, Moore's Plantation, Brick House, Seven Creeks, Evacuation of Wilmington

Joseph Graham (October 15, 1759 – November 12, 1836) was a Revolutionary War militia officer, politician, and wealthy ironmonger from Mecklenburg County, North Carolina.

== Life story ==
He was born on October 13, 1759, in Chester County, Pennsylvania, to James Graham and Mary McConnell Barber Graham (2nd wife). His parents were both Scots-Irish. His father died before 1763 when he moved with his mother and siblings to Mecklenburg County, North Carolina. He became a farmer and ironmonger. In 1814 he was a Councilor of State for North Carolina. Later in life, he was on the board of trustees of the University of North Carolina.

=== Military service ===
Joseph served as a Patriot in the American Revolution:

- Captain, NC State Legion (1781-1782)
- Major, Lincoln County Regiment (1782-1783), commission on October 7, 1781, commissioned by Brig. Gen. Griffith Rutherford to serve under Col. Robert Smith. On July 25, 1782, he was under Col. Joseph Dickson (Lincoln County Regiment).

Severely wounded at the Battle of Charlotte on September 26, 1780. Graham was in many battles and skirmishes during the American Revolution including the actions at Stono, Charlotte, Cowan's Ford, Pyle's Defeat, Clapp's Mill, Raft Swamp, Moore's Plantation, Brick House, Seven Creeks and the Evacuation of Wilmington.

During the War of 1812, he was selected as a brigadier general to lead a brigade of North Carolina and South Carolina militia. As part of his service, Graham directed the construction of Fort Bainbridge located on the Federal Road in the Mississippi Territory (modern day Alabama).

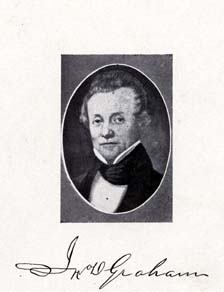
Joseph Graham in 1820

After the wars, he assisted Archibald D. Murphey in preparation of a book on the history of North Carolina. Although the book was never completed, his manuscripts were included in the North Carolina archives and were compiled into a book by William A. Graham in 1904. This book includes a sketch of Joseph. A copy of a portrait of Joseph was made in the early 1800s.

== Death ==
He died on November 12, 1836, at his home, Vesuvius Furnace, in Catawba Springs, Lincoln County, North Carolina. He was buried at the Machpelah Presbyterian Church Cemetery in Lincolnton, Lincoln County, North Carolina.
