= Federal Road (Creek lands) =

Georgia-Alabama mail road

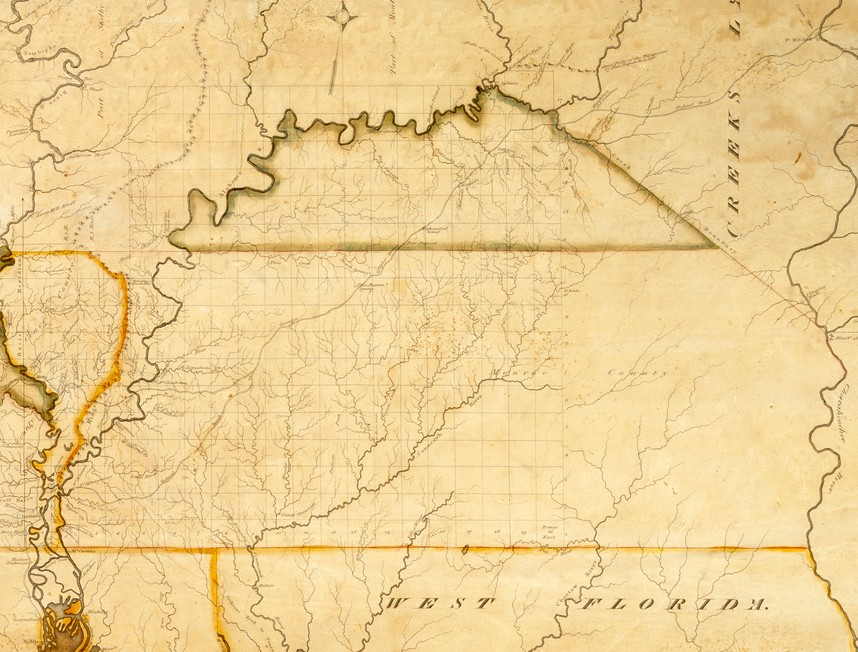

Route information
- Existed: 1811–1840s

Major junctions
- From: Milledgeville, Georgia
- To: Fort Stoddert

Location
- Country: United States

Highway system

The Federal Road through the territory of the Creek people was a project that started in 1805 when the Creek gave permission for the development of a "horse path" through their nation for more efficient mail delivery between Washington City (modern-day Washington, D.C.) and New Orleans, Louisiana. This section started at Fort Wilkinson near Milledgeville, Georgia, and ended at Fort Stoddert near Mobile, Alabama. By the time of the War of 1812, the Federal Road began in Augusta, Georgia, ran through Fort Hawkins (in Macon, Georgia), on to Fort Mitchell, Alabama (near modern Phenix City, Alabama), and was connected via the Three Notch Road to Pensacola in Spanish West Florida. The road was first opened in 1805 and in 1807 "extended two years later to Natchez, running through the present town of Monticello." This route was used by migrants from Georgia and the Carolinas who sought to settle in the Natchez District and American Louisiana.

The Federal Road was at first for mail delivery. It was widened into a war road during 1811, and used during the Creek War (1813–14). The result was removal of most of the Creek people to the West.

Another Federal Road (Cherokee lands) went from Savannah, Georgia through northern Georgia to Knoxville, Tennessee, and opened up Cherokee land for settlement.

== See also ==
- National Road
