= Jeremiah Austill =

American politician, planter and soldier (1794 – 1879)

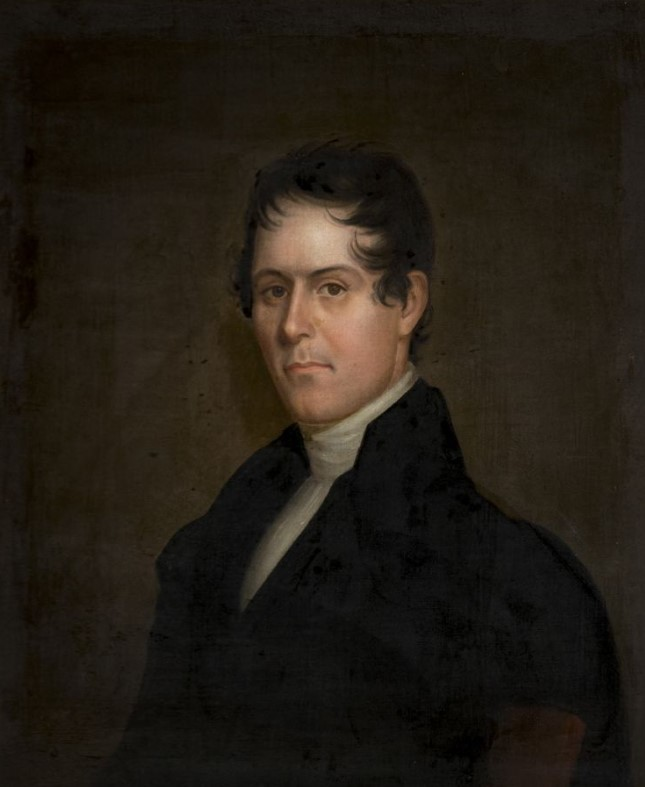

Member of the Alabama House of Representatives from Mobile County
- In office 1845—1846

Personal details
- Born: August 10, 1794 Oconee Station, Pendleton District, South Carolina
- Died: December 8, 1879 (aged 85) Clarke County, Alabama
- Resting place: Austill Cemetery; 31°24′55″N 87°52′12″W
- Spouses: Martha Hayes (m. 1819; died 1820) Margaret Ervin Eades (m. 1834)
- Children: 5
- Occupation: Clerk, merchant, planter

Military service
- Allegiance: United States
- Branch/service: 1st Regiment, Mississippi Territorial Volunteers
- Years of service: 1813 – 1815
- Rank: Sergeant
- Battles/wars: Creek War; Canoe Fight; Battle of Holy Ground

Jeremiah Austill (August 10, 1794 – December 8, 1879) was an American politician, planter and soldier who served in the Alabama Militia during the Creek War, in which he participated in a skirmish that became known as the Canoe Fight. After the Creek War, Austill held various jobs and briefly served as a member of the Alabama House of Representatives.

== Early life ==
Austill was born on August 10, 1794, near Oconee Station, South Carolina. His father, Evan Austill, was an assistant Indian agent to the Cherokee. In 1798, the Austill family moved to Georgia to live among the Cherokee. By age six, Austill was sent back to South Carolina to attend school. Austill, along with his parents and siblings, moved to Washington County, Mississippi Territory (present-day Clarke County, Alabama) in 1812.

== Military service ==
Soon after the Austills arrived in Alabama, the Creek War began as a conflict between two rival Creek factions, the Creek national government and the rebellious Red Sticks. By July 1813, local settlers had constructed Fort Glass to protect themselves from retaliatory Red Stick attacks. Around the time of the Battle of Burnt Corn Austill contracted malaria, which prevented him from joining the local militia. Austill trained under a Dr. Lowery while living in Fort Madison, assisting in operating on wounded soldiers and civilians.

After the Kimbell-James massacre at Fort Sinquefield, Austill volunteered to relay news of the attack from Fort Madison to Fort Stoddert, a thirty-seven mile ride, to request additional protection for the occupants of Fort Madison from General Ferdinand Claiborne, who was headquartered at Mount Vernon Cantonment. Austill returned to Fort Madison and brought word that the residents of Forts Madison and Glass needed to abandon their posts and move to Fort St. Stephens out of fear of a Red Stick attack. The soldiers who were stationed in Fort Madison left, leaving Austill's father in command of the fort.

On November 11, 1813, Captain Samuel Dale organized an expedition at Fort Madison to travel east of the Alabama River and drive away the Red Sticks from the surrounding area. While paddling two canoes, Dale, Austill, James Smith, and a free Black named Caesar attacked nine Red Stick warriors (who were also in canoes), in a fierce melee which became known as the Canoe Fight. Austill was wounded by a blow to the head but soon recovered.

After the Canoe Fight, Austill assisted in the construction of Fort Claiborne prior to participating in the Battle of Holy Ground. During the battle, Austill transported the Choctaw chief Pushmataha and five to six warriors across the Alabama River. After crossing the river the party captured an untold amount of Red Stick supplies.

During the Creek War, Austill served as a private with the 1st Regiment, Mississippi Territorial Volunteers and as a sergeant with Carson's Regiment of Mississippi Militia. Austill was referred to as "Colonel Austill" and "Major Austill" later in his life, despite never being listed in military documentation as officially obtaining these ranks.

== Civilian career ==
At the conclusion of the Creek War, Austill settled where the city of Montgomery now stands. His maternal uncle, David Files, then asked Austill to serve as a clerk at his store in St. Stephens. Files served as a quartermaster and paymaster for the United States Army and sent Austill to Mobile and New Orleans to settle customers' debts. While in New Orleans, Austill contracted yellow fever and lost 84 pounds. He then conducted business for his uncle in New York City, Baltimore, and Philadelphia, prior to returning to St. Stephens. While Austill was in the Northeast, his father died and was buried near the site of Fort Madison.

Files died in 1820. Prior to his death, he served as marshal for southern Alabama. Tolliver Livingston was chosen to replace Files as marshal, but Livingston was physically handicapped. Austill was made deputy marshal to carry out the physical duties of the office and served in that position from 1818 to 1823. He was then asked to serve as clerk for the Court of Mobile and cotton weigher for the city. He also clerked for the United States District Court for the Southern District of Alabama.

While serving as clerk, Austill also worked as a commission merchant. He modified the way cotton was weighed locally in Mobile, leading to an increased amount of cotton being brought to market. This caused him to resign as clerk and commence work as a full-time commission merchant. As a merchant, Austill handled multiple accounts, including those of Charles Tait.

Austill served as the foreman of the first hook and ladder company of Mobile from 1827 to 1829.

In 1829, Austill and Thomas Rhodes of Mississippi formed a partnership and entered into a contract with the United States Post Office Department to deliver mail between Mobile and New Orleans. The route took mail by stagecoach from Mobile to Pascagoula, then by boat from that location to New Orleans. Austill and Rhodes were paid for the transportation of the mail but were initially not reimbursed for the stagecoach road. The construction payment was settled in the United States Court of Claims in 1856.

In 1832, Austill served as the Port Warden for Mobile.

Following the Treaty of Cusseta in March 1832, all Creek land east of the Mississippi River was ceded to the United States. Prior to the processing of these lands, squatters began occupying the former Creek land. Austill was made a deputy marshal and was headquartered at Fort Mitchell with the task of keeping the squatters away. In July 1833, one of the squatters, Hardeman Owens (who was the County Commissioner of Roads and Revenue for the newly created Russell County), was shot by soldiers during an eviction attempt after booby trapping his home. Owens' death angered local settlers, who appealed to the Russell County Court. The Court issued an arrest warrant for Austill and the soldiers who were present at the time of Owens' death, but there is no record of Austill's actual arrest.

During the Panic of 1837 Austill lost $170,000. Even so, he was able to purchase a plantation on the Tombigbee River in 1840, (which included the site of Fort Carney), and built a home there in 1844. Austill raised cotton and sugar cane on his plantation. His home was notable for the addition of a water ram in 1848 that allowed water to be delivered to the house via pipes instead of through physical labor.

In 1845, Austill was elected to serve as a Democratic member of the Alabama House of Representatives, serving one term from 1845 to 1846.

== Personal life ==
Austill married Martha Hayes on March 9, 1819, in Burnt Corn, Alabama. After marriage, the couple lived near Bermuda, Alabama. Martha died in Claiborne, Alabama on November 1, 1820, after falling from a fence post. After his wife's death, Austill sold their farm and returned ten slaves to his father-in-law.

On October 10, 1834, Austill married Margaret Ervin Eades, the daughter of John Eades of Georgia and Jenny Fee of County Armagh, Ireland. The elder Eades assisted in constructing Fort Carney. There he was hailed by Austill who brought news of the attack on Fort Sinquefield. This marriage produced two sons and three daughters. One son, Hurieosco Austill, served as a member of the Alabama House of Representatives and Alabama Senate, as well as Chancellor of the United States District Court for the Southern District of Alabama.

Austill's grandson, Jere Austill, was a college football player, coach, and lawyer.

== Death and legacy ==
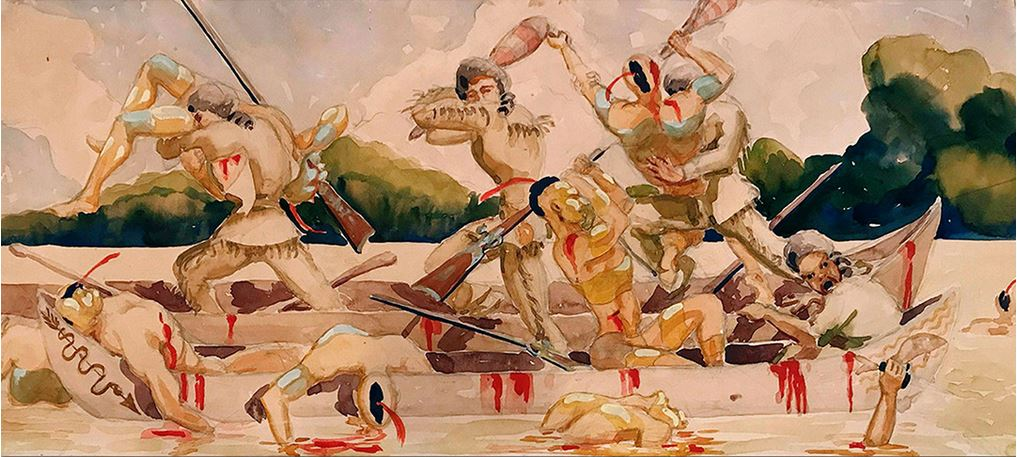
1938 depiction of the Canoe Fight

Austill died on December 8, 1879. The marker at his grave site erroneously lists his year of death as 1881 and was placed in 1929 by the Needham Bryan Chapter of the Daughters of the American Revolution.

Despite his multiple occupations, Austill is most well known for his participation in the Canoe Fight. A historical marker was placed by the Clarke County Historical Society in 2014 near the site of Austill's grave, listing his date of death as December 9, 1879.

Austill was included in at least two depictions of the Canoe Fight, both created during the New Deal: John Kelly Fitzpatrick's study for the post office at Ozark, Alabama (not accepted for final publication) and John Augustus Walker's mural for Mobile's Old City Hall.

== Sources ==
- Austill, Jeremiah (1944a). Marie Bankhead Owen (ed.). "Autobiography of Jeremiah Austill". Alabama Historical Quarterly. 6 (1).
- Ball, Timothy (1882). A Glance Into The Great South-East; Or, Clarke County, Alabama, And Its Surroundings, From 1540 To 1877. Chicago, Illinois: Knight & Leonard.
- Brantley, Mary E. (1976). Early settlers along the Old Federal Road in Monroe & Conecuh Counties, Alabama. Baltimore, Maryland: Gateway Press.
- Green, Michael D. (1982). The Politics of Indian Removal: Creek Government and Society in Crisis. Lincoln, Nebraska: University of Nebraska Press. ISBN 0-8032-2109-6.
- Halbert, Henry; Ball, Timothy (1895). The Creek War of 1813 and 1814. Chicago, Illinois: Donohue & Henneberry. ISBN 9781375702775.
- Pickett, Albert James (1878). History of Alabama, and Incidentally of Georgia and Mississippi, from the Earliest Period. Tuscaloosa, Alabama: Willo Publishing Company. ISBN 978-1363310845.
- Rowland, Dunbar, ed. (1921). Publications of the Mississippi Historical Society. Vol. IV. Jackson, Mississippi: State of Mississippi.
