= Fort Easley =

United States historic site in Alabama

- Campbell, Alabama in United States
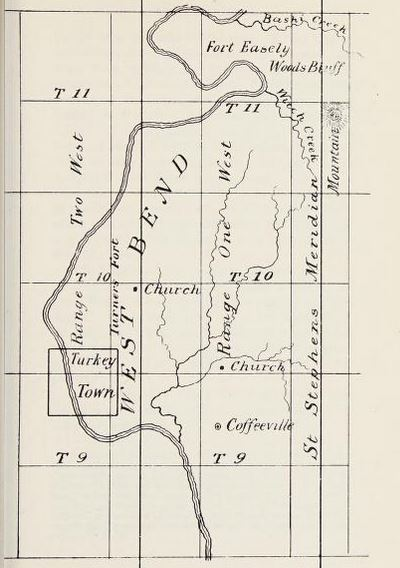
- Site of Fort Easley (spelled Easely) and Turkey Town

Site information
- Type: Stockade fort
- Owner: Private
- Controlled by: Private
- Open to the public: No

Location
- Location within Alabama Location within the United States
- Coordinates: 31°56′09″N 88°03′42″W

Site history
- Built: 1813
- Built by: Mississippi Territory settlers
- In use: 1813
- Battles/wars: Creek War

Fort Easley was a stockade fort built in 1813 in present-day Clarke County, Alabama during the Creek War (part of the larger War of 1812).

== History ==
=== Creek War ===
Fort Easley was built in 1813 on the east side of the Tombigbee River to provide local settlers protection from hostile Creek (known as Red Sticks) attacks. The fort was a stockade fort and encompassed three acres and a spring. The fort was named for an early settler of the area. The bluff Fort Easley was built on (Woods Bluff), was named for a Major Wood, who owned the surrounding land and fought in the Battle of Burnt Corn Creek.

A camp meeting was held at Fort Easley in early August 1813, prior to the Fort Mims massacre. Occupants from the nearby Turner's Fort also attended the meeting. Guards were stationed around the fort to prevent a surprise attack by Red Stick warriors.

On August 21, 1813, a Choctaw warrior from the nearby village of Turkey Town named Bakers Hunter arrived at Fort Easley with news of an impending Red Stick attack. The Red Sticks reportedly had four hundred warriors waiting around twelve miles north of Fort Easley and planned to attack Fort Easley, then Fort Madison, with the assistance of Choctaw warriors from Turkey Town. This news was further corroborated to Fort Easley's commander, Captain Cassity, by a settler who lived among the Choctaw. These reports were forwarded to Fort Madison the next day, then on August 23 reached General Ferdinand Claiborne at St. Stephens. The next day more than one hundred settlers who were fleeing Fort Easley arrived at St. Stephens, leaving approximately six to fifteen soldiers to defend Fort Easley. Based on these reports, Claiborne felt it necessary to send reinforcements to Fort Easley, and he personally led twenty dragoons and sixty soldiers to defend the fort. After Claiborne decided Fort Easley was in no further danger, he planned to return to Fort Stoddert. En route, he was met with news of the massacre at Fort Mims and immediately set out for the cantonment at Mount Vernon.

In early October 1813, Colonel William McGrew (who also participated in the Battle of Burnt Corn Creek) left St. Stephens and traveled towards Fort Easley with twenty-five militia members after hearing reports of Red Stick warriors in the area. Near Fort Easley, the party was ambushed by Red Sticks resulting in the deaths of McGrew and three additional militia members. This incident became known as the Bashi Skirmish. Soon after, General Thomas Flourney, commander of the 7th Military District, commanded Claiborne to carry out an expedition to the same area. Claiborne's forces consisted of volunteers, some militia companies, and dragoons under Lieutenant Thomas Hinds. Prior to arriving at Fort Easley, the force discovered the bodies of McGrew and the three militia members. Three of Hinds' men were also wounded when they were ambushed by Red Sticks. Many of the soldiers on this expedition became disgruntled (including Jeremiah Austill, who would soon become known for his participation in the Canoe Fight), and dubbed the affair the "Potato Expedition". Claiborne stayed at Fort Easley for approximately one month, but did not encounter any additional Red Stick warriors, then returned to St. Stephens.

Some time after Claiborne left, Fort Easley was abandoned.

=== Present day ===
Nothing remains at the site of Fort Easley today. The United States Army Corps of Engineers operates the Woods Bluff Public Access Area near the former site of Fort Easley. A community known as Woods Bluff formed around the site and operated a post office under the name Woods Bluff from 1835 to 1937.

== Sources ==
- Bunn, Mike; Williams, Clay (2008). Battle for the Southern Frontier: The Creek War and the War of 1812. Charleston, South Carolina: The History Press. ISBN 978-1-62584-381-4.
- Claiborne, John Francis Hamtramck (1860). The Life and Times of General Samuel Dale, the Mississippi Partisan. New York, New York: Harper & Brothers. ISBN 9781164887041.
- Foscue, Virginia (1989). Place Names in Alabama. Tuscaloosa, Alabama: The University of Alabama Press. ISBN 0-8173-0410-X.
- Halbert, Henry; Ball, Timothy (1895). The Creek War of 1813 and 1814. Chicago, Illinois: Donohue & Henneberry. ISBN 9781375702775.
- Harris, W. Stuart (1977). Dead Towns of Alabama. Tuscaloosa, Alabama: University of Alabama Press. ISBN 0-8173-1125-4.
- Lossing, Benson (1869). The Pictorial Field-Book of the War of 1812. New York, New York: Harper & Brothers. ISBN 9780781251136.
- Smith, Derek (1990). "'Frontier Armageddon' at Bloody Fort Mims". Army. 40 (1). ISSN 0004-2455.
- Weir, Howard (2016). A Paradise of Blood: The Creek War of 1813-14. Yardley, Pennsylvania: Westholme. ISBN 978-1-59416-270-1.
