= Fort Carney =

United States historic site in Alabama

- Jackson, Alabama in United States
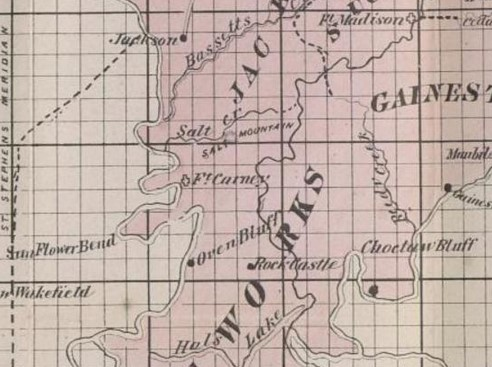
- Fort Carney (center) on 1882 map by Timothy H. Ball. Fort Madison is located in the upper-right.

Site information
- Type: Stockade fort
- Owner: Private
- Controlled by: Private
- Open to the public: No

Location
- Location within Alabama Location within the United States
- Coordinates: 31°24′18″N 87°54′16″W

Site history
- Built: 1813
- Built by: Mississippi Territory settlers
- In use: 1813–1814, 1862–1865
- Battles/wars: Creek War, American Civil War

Fort Carney was a stockade fort built in 1813 in present-day Clarke County, Alabama, during the Creek War (part of the larger War of 1812).

== History ==
=== Creek War ===
After Red Stick warriors began attacking settlers in the area, many families joined to create protective stockades. Josiah Carney, who moved to Clarke County in 1809 from North Carolina, began building a stockade in 1813 at Carney's Bluff. Carney's Bluff was later known as Gullett's Bluff. Fort Carney was also known as Fort Hawn or Fort Gullett. The fort site was located six miles south of Jackson on the road from Jackson to Mount Vernon.

Sources differ on the number of occupants of Fort Carney. Albert J. Pickett reported 390 individuals occupied Fort Carney, while Timothy H. Ball stated that it only contained "a few occupants".

Sixty members of the 8th Regiment Mississippi Militia occupied Fort Carney.

Prior to the Fort Mims massacre, it was reported that Red Stick warriors examined Fort Carney but decided to attack Fort Mims instead.

Fort Powell was a stockade fort located three miles south of Fort Carney at Oven Bluff. After the Fort Mims massacre, settlers from Fort Powell moved to Fort Carney before moving to Mount Vernon.

Jeremiah Austill, who gained fame for his participation in the Canoe Fight, stopped at Fort Carney on his ride from Fort Madison to Fort Stoddert. Austill volunteered for the seventy-five mile ride to request additional protection for the occupants of Fort Madison.

=== American Civil War ===
During the Civil War, a Confederate fort named Fort Gullett was built on the site of Fort Carney. Fort Gullett was built in 1862 to protect the nearby salt wells. Fort Gullett also served to prevent Federal gunboats from traveling up the Tombigbee River. The fort was abandoned in the later years of the Civil War.

== Sources ==
- Ball, Timothy Horton (1994) [1882]. A Glance into the Great South-East, or Clarke County, Alabama, and its surroundings, from 1540 to 1877. Grove Hill, Alabama: Clarke County Historical Society. OCLC 1009338180.
- Bunn, Mike; Williams, Clay (2008). Battle for the Southern Frontier: The Creek War and the War of 1812. Charleston, South Carolina: The History Press. ISBN 978-1-62584-381-4.
- Harris, W. Stuart (1977). Dead Towns of Alabama. Tuscaloosa, Alabama: University of Alabama Press. ISBN 0-8173-1125-4.
- Mobile District USACE (August 1973). Black Warrior and Tombigbee Rivers Maintenance: Draft Environmental Impact Statement (Report). "Data Prepared Under Contract by Natural Resources Center of the University of Alabama"
- Pickett, Albert James (1878). History of Alabama, and Incidentally of Georgia and Mississippi, from the Earliest Period. Tuscaloosa, Alabama: Willo Publishing Company. ISBN 978-1363310845.
- Rowland, Dunbar, ed. (1921). Publications of the Mississippi Historical Society: Centenary series. Vol. IV. Jackson, Mississippi: Mississippi Historical Society. ISBN 978-0526689989.
- Windham, Kathryn Tucker (2007). Alabama, One Big Front Porch. Montgomery, Alabama: NewSouth Books. ISBN 978-1-58838-219-1.
