= Bermuda, Alabama =

Unincorporated community in Brownsville, Alabama

- Unincorporated community
- Location within Alabama Location within the United States
- Coordinates: 31°29′15″N 87°11′18″W
- Country: United States
- State: Alabama
- County: Conecuh
- Elevation: 344 ft (105 m)
- Time zone: UTC-6 (Central (CST))
  - Summer (DST): UTC-5 (CDT)
- Area code: 251
- GNIS feature ID: 113952

Bermuda is an unincorporated community in Conecuh County, Alabama, United States.

== History ==
The community is likely named after Bermudagrass, which was tested in the area. The U.S. Department of Agriculture, Weather Bureau, Alabama Section, operated a weather station in Bermuda. Jeremiah Austill, who participated in the Canoe Fight during the Creek War, lived near the present site of Bermuda. Bermuda is located along the route of the Federal Road.
