= Fort Claiborne =

United States historic site in Alabama

- Perdue Hill, Alabama in United States
- Historic marker for Fort Claiborne

Site information
- Type: Stockade fort
- Owner: Private
- Controlled by: Private
- Open to the public: No

Location
- Location within Alabama Location within the United States
- Coordinates: 31°32′28″N 87°30′46″W

Site history
- Built: 1813
- Built by: United States Army
- In use: 1813-1816
- Battles/wars: Creek War

Fort Claiborne was a stockade fort built in 1813 in present-day Monroe County, Alabama during the Creek War.

== History ==
=== Creek War ===
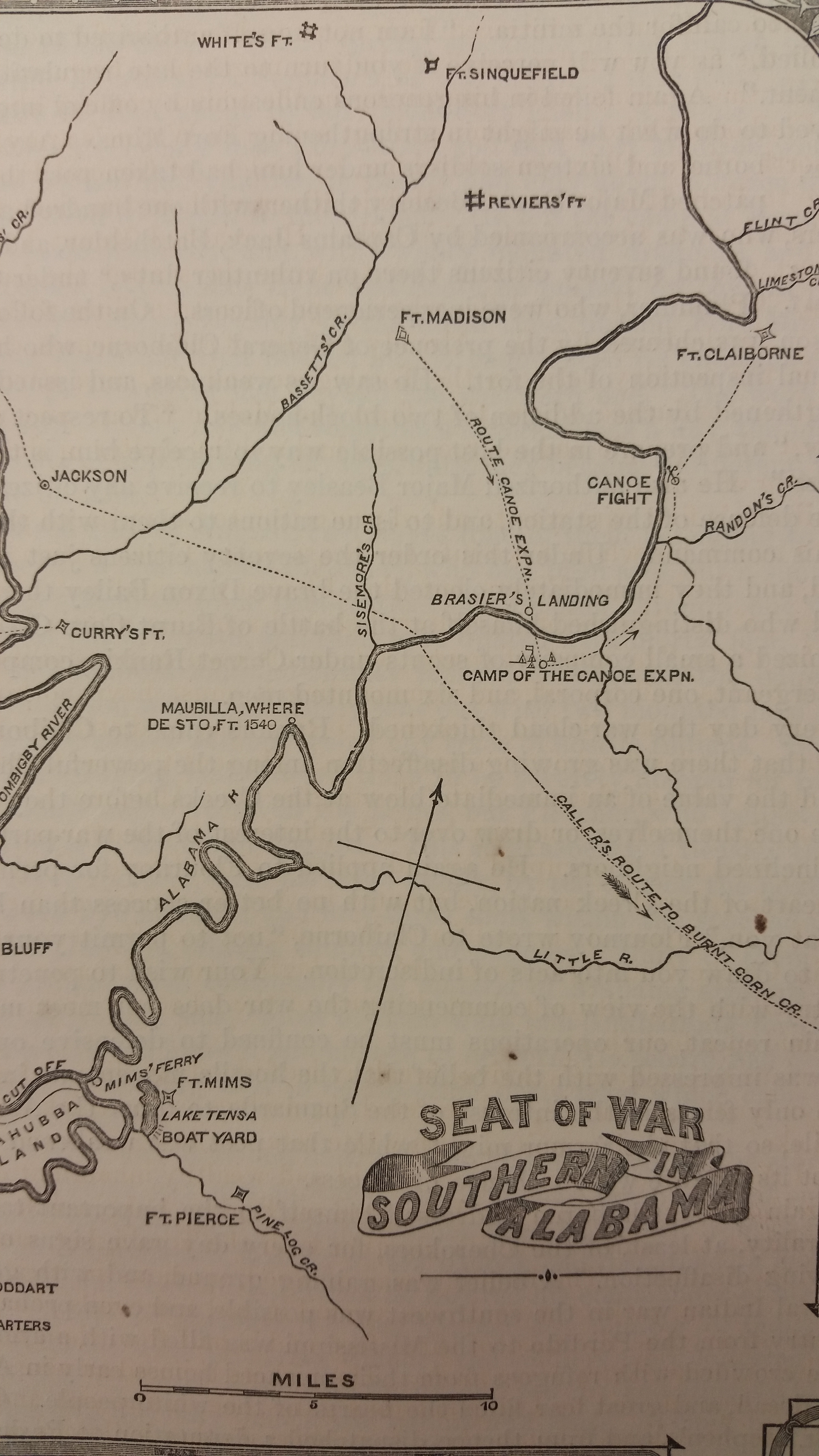
Location of Fort Claiborne located in the upper right of map

In the fall of 1813, General Thomas Fluornoy commanded General Ferdinand Claiborne to advance up the Alabama River from Fort Stoddert with seven hundred men in response to a request from General Andrew Jackson. The fort was originally planned to supply Jackson in an assault on Pensacola, but this assault was never carried out. Claiborne began building a fort on Weatherford's Bluff in November 1813 and named it Fort Claiborne. Fort Claiborne consisted of a 200-square foot stockade with three blockhouses and a half-moon battery and was completed by the end of the month. The battery faced the Alabama River so as to protect the fort from an amphibious assault. In a letter to Jackson, Claiborne described the fields around the fort site to provide "imence [sic] crops of corn and pumpkins". While constructing the fort, Claiborne's soldiers harassed the Red Sticks' communications with the Spanish in Pensacola. On November 28, Colonel Gilbert C. Russell and the 3rd U.S. Infantry Regiment arrived at Fort Claiborne, bringing the cannon for the fort battery and swivel guns. Major Thomas Hinds and a Captain Jones also attacked and killed Red Stick warriors in the surrounding area.

In December 1813, General Claiborne wrote General Jackson that he planned to carry out an offensive against the Red Sticks. Prior to the offensive, Claiborne sent spies to Pensacola who reported back that British forces had not landed in Pensacola but were anchored offshore. On December 13, Claiborne's force set out for the Creek encampment Holy Ground (located in modern Lowndes County) to the tune of "Over the Hills and Far Away". The force consisted of the 3rd U.S. Regiment, Mississippi Territory volunteers, a cavalry battalion, local militia under the command of Samuel Dale (who were originally at Fort Madison), and Choctaw warriors under the command of Pushmataha. On December 23, 1813, the Battle of Holy Ground was fought. After the battle, the American forces returned to Fort Claiborne. General Claiborne returned to his home in Natchez due to illness and Colonel Russell was placed in command of Fort Claiborne.

After the Battle of Holy Ground, Colonel Russell planned to attack multiple Creek villages on the Cahaba River, but the expedition was unable to be carried out due to logistical difficulties. Russell hoped to avoid using civilian contractors to supply the expedition, so he ordered Captain James Dinkins to construct two bateau to transport supplies and reinforcements and rendezvous at the mouth of the Cahaba. The boats took seventy soldiers and sixty-nine barrels of supplies and were outfitted with makeshift armor. One boat was armed with a swivel gun. After leaving Fort Claiborne on February 1, 1814, Russell's force was joined by a company of soldiers under the command of Lieutenant Joseph M. Wilcox. The combined forces reached the rendezvous point where they planned to meet Dinkins, but Dinkins never arrived. Wilcox and five other soldiers were sent to find Dinkins but were attacked by Creek warriors. Russell returned to Fort Claiborne on February 18. After his return, Dale's militia was disbanded. Russell planned another expedition up the Alabama River to Hickory Ground with a fleet of boats and Chickasaw and Choctaw warriors, but this expedition was never carried out.

Prior to the Battle of Horseshoe Bend, Colonel Russell was expected to bring supplies up the Alabama River to combine forces with General Jackson from Fort Williams and Colonel Homer Milton from Fort Decatur and meet at Hickory Ground. Russell commanded five hundred troops of the 3rd Regiment and expected to be reinforced by seven hundred to eight hundred Mississippi Territory militia members. Jackson instead deviated from the original plan conceived by General Thomas Pinckney and Russell never rendezvoused with the remaining forces. After the Battle of Horseshoe Bend, Pinckney took over command of Fort Jackson and commanded Colonel Milton and the 39th Infantry Regiment to bring Colonel Russell and the 3rd Infantry Regiment to Fort Jackson from Fort Claiborne.

Jackson planned to have West Tennessee troops transferred from Fayetteville, Tennessee to Fort Claiborne to oppose any offensive of British forces based in Pensacola.

Captain James Craig of the West Tennessee militia commanded Fort Claiborne from October to December 1814.

Due to its location, the construction of Fort Claiborne effectively put an end to Creek attacks in the southern part of their original territory.

Fort Claiborne was not located on the Federal Road, but was connected to it by a spur road that began at Burnt Corn.

William Weatherford lived for a time at Fort Claiborne after local settlers in the area (who were angered at Weatherford over the Fort Mims massacre) forced him to leave his plantation.

=== Postwar ===
In 1816, the community of Claiborne was founded near the site of the fort and soon engulfed the fort and surrounding area.

A post office operated under the name Fort Claiborne from 1815 to 1822. The first postmaster of Fort Claiborne was John Watkins.

=== Present ===
Nothing remains at the site of Fort Claiborne today, but a historical marker notes its approximate location. A stone monument erected by the Alabama Society of Colonial Dames was placed near the site in 1939.

== Units ==
The 3rd and 4th Regiments of East Tennessee Militia and the 1st and 2nd Regiments West Tennessee Militia were stationed at Fort Claiborne at various times.

== Sources ==
- Blackmon, Richard (2014). The Creek War 1813-1814 (PDF). Washington, D.C.: United States Army Center of Military History. ISBN 9780160925429. Archived from the original (PDF) on September 6, 2015. "CMH Pub 74-4"
- Braund, Kathryn E. Holland (2012). Tohopeka: Rethinking the Creek War & the War of 1812. Tuscaloosa, Alabama: University of Alabama Press. ISBN 978-0-8173-5711-5.
- Braund, Kathryn; Waselkov, Gregory; Christopher, Raven (2019). The Old Federal Road in Alabama. Tuscaloosa, Alabama: University of Alabama Press. ISBN 978-0-8173-5930-0.
- Bunn, Mike (2019). Early Alabama: An Illustrated Guide to the Formative Years, 1798-1826. Tuscaloosa, Alabama: University of Alabama Press. ISBN 978-0-8173-5928-7.
- Bunn, Mike; Williams, Clay (2008). Battle for the Southern Frontier: The Creek War and the War of 1812. Charleston, South Carolina: The History Press. ISBN 978-1-62584-381-4.
- Claiborne, Ferdinand (1926) [Composed 1813]. Bassett, John Spencer (ed.). Correspondence of Andrew Jackson. Vol. 1. Washington, D.C.: Carnegie Institution of Washington.
- Eggleston, George Cary (1878). Red Eagle and the Wars with the Creek Indians of Alabama. New York, New York: Dodd, Mead & Company. ISBN 9780548127322.
- Harris, W. Stuart (1977). Dead Towns of Alabama. Tuscaloosa, Alabama: University of Alabama Press. ISBN 0-8173-1125-4.
- Jackson, Andrew (1927) [Composed 4 September 1814]. Bassett, John Spencer (ed.). Correspondence of Andrew Jackson. Vol. 2. Washington, D.C.: Carnegie Institution of Washington.
- Lewis, Herbert James (2018). Alabama Founders: Fourteen Political and Military Leaders Who Shaped the State. Tuscaloosa, Alabama: University of Alabama Press. ISBN 978-0-8173-5915-7.
- Pickett, Albert James (1878). History of Alabama, and Incidentally of Georgia and Mississippi, from the Earliest Period. Tuscaloosa, Alabama: Willo Publishing Company. ISBN 978-1363310845.
- Weir, Howard (2016). A Paradise of Blood: The Creek War of 1813-14. Yardley, Pennsylvania: Westholme. ISBN 1-59416-270-0.
