= Joseph M. Wilcox =

American military officer (1790-1814)

Joseph Morgan Wilcox (15 March 1790 – 15 January 1814) was an American military officer who was killed during the Creek War.

A native of Killingworth, Connecticut, Wilcox graduated from the United States Military Academy in 1812 (1st of his class) and was directly commissioned as a first lieutenant in the 3rd Regiment. Lieutenant Wilcox joined Colonel Gilbert C. Russell' force that left Fort Claiborne to attack Red Stick villages on the Cahaba River. Two barges were planned to meet the main force, but never made it to the rendezvous point. Colonel Russell sent Lt. Wilcox and five additional soldiers to scout for the missing barges. On January 15, 1814, Wilcox was tomahawked and scalped by a group of Creek warriors near the Alabama River. Wilcox County, Alabama, formed from land ceded to the United States as a result of the Creek War, is named in his honor. He was initially buried at Fort Claiborne in Monroe County, but was later reburied in Camden in Wilcox County.
