= Sinquefield =

Sinquefield may refer to:

- Fort Sinquefield, the historic site of a wooden stockade fortification in Clarke County, Alabama
- Sinquefield Cup, an annual, invite-only chess tournament in St. Louis, Missouri, named in honor of Rex and Jeanne Sinquefield
- Rex Sinquefield (born 1944), American financial executive
