= Jere Austill =

American football player, coach, and lawyer (1890–1964)

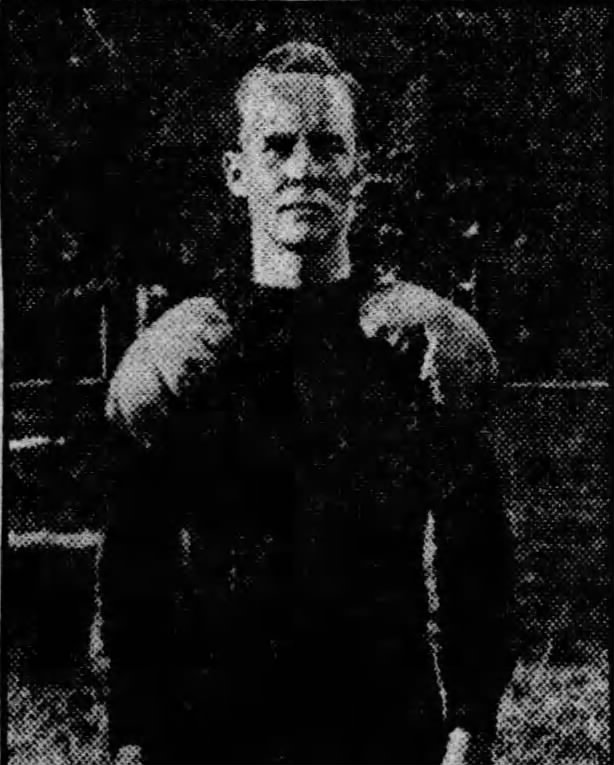
- Austill in 1910

Biographical details
- Born: October 7, 1890; Mobile, Alabama, U.S.
- Died: April 17, 1964 (aged 73); Mobile, Alabama, U.S.
- Education: University of Alabama (1911)

Playing career

Football
- 1907–1910: Alabama

Baseball
- 1908–1911: Alabama
- Position: Fullback (football)

Coaching career (HC unless noted)

Football
- 1910: Alabama (sophomores)
- 1911: Southern (AL)
- 1912–1913: Spring Hill

Head coaching record
- Overall: 8–11–1

Jere Austill Sr. (October 7, 1890 – April 17, 1964) was an American college football player, coach, and lawyer.

Austill was born on October 7, 1890, in Mobile, Alabama. He played football and baseball at the University of Alabama while studying law. During his senior year he served as the football team's sophomore coach. After graduation he was hired as the head football coach for Southern University. After one year he joined Spring Hill College where he spent two seasons as head coach.

After Austill's coaching career ended he was appointed commissioner over South Alabama. He also served on the Alabama State Bar. After his tenure ended he served as a lawyer until his death of a heart attack on April 17, 1964.

Austill's grandfather Jeremiah Austill was a member of the Alabama House of Representatives.

== Head coaching record ==
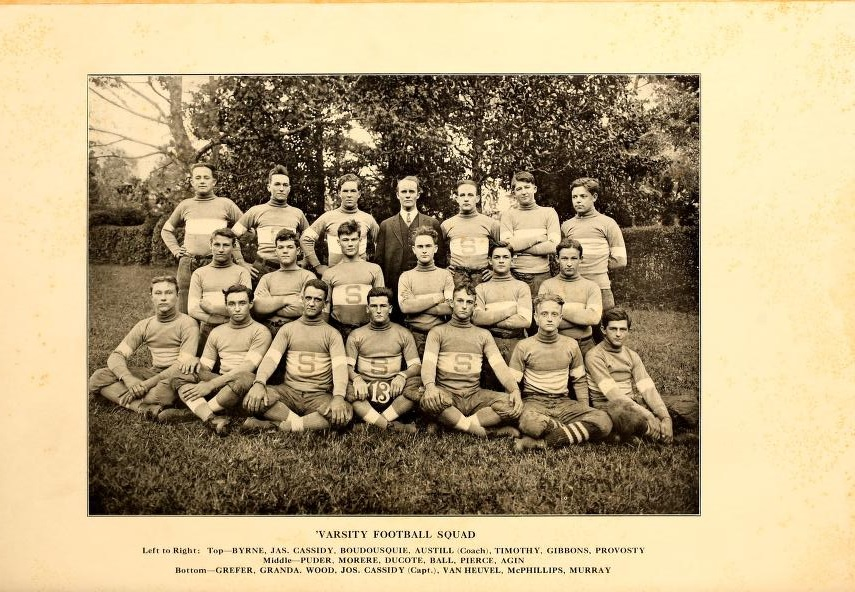
Austill with Spring Hill during the 1913 season

Year	Team	Overall	Conference	Standing	Bowl/playoffs
Southern (Independent) (1911)
1911	Southern	1–6–1			
Southern:		1–6–1			
Spring Hill Badgers (Independent) (1912–1913)
1912	Spring Hill	4–2			
1913	Spring Hill	3–3			
Spring Hill:		7–5			
Total:		8–11–1			
