= Gilbert C. Russell =

Gilbert Christian Russell
- Born: May 18, 1782; Virginia
- Died: May 25, 1861 (aged 79)
- Military career
- Allegiance: United States
- Branch: United States Army
- Service years: 1803–1807, 1808–1815
- Rank: Colonel
- Conflicts: Creek War

Gilbert Christian Russell (May 18, 1782 - May 25, 1861) was an American military officer who served during the Creek War. Born in Virginia, Russell moved to Alabama as a young man. In 1809, Russell was serving as commandant of Fort Pickering when Meriwether Lewis spent two weeks there on his trip to Washington, D.C. Russell and Lewis became friends, and Russell attempted to accompany Lewis on the remainder of his journey but Russell's superiors denied his request. During the Creek War, he was the commander of the 3rd U.S. Infantry Regiment of the United States Army. His soldiers reinforced General Ferdinand Claiborne at Fort Claiborne and on December 13, 1813, the combined forces launched an invasion at the core of the Creek Nation which culminated in a victory over the Creek at the Battle of Holy Ground. After the Battle of Holy Ground, Russell planned an unsuccessful attack on Red Stick villages located on the Cahaba River. After the Battle of Horseshoe Bend, Russell and the 3rd Infantry were transferred from Fort Claiborne to Fort Jackson. Russell County, Alabama was named in his honor.
