= Canoe Fight (Creek War) =

Skirmish with Native Indians

Coordinates: 31.43181°N 87.57666°W

- Part of the Creek War
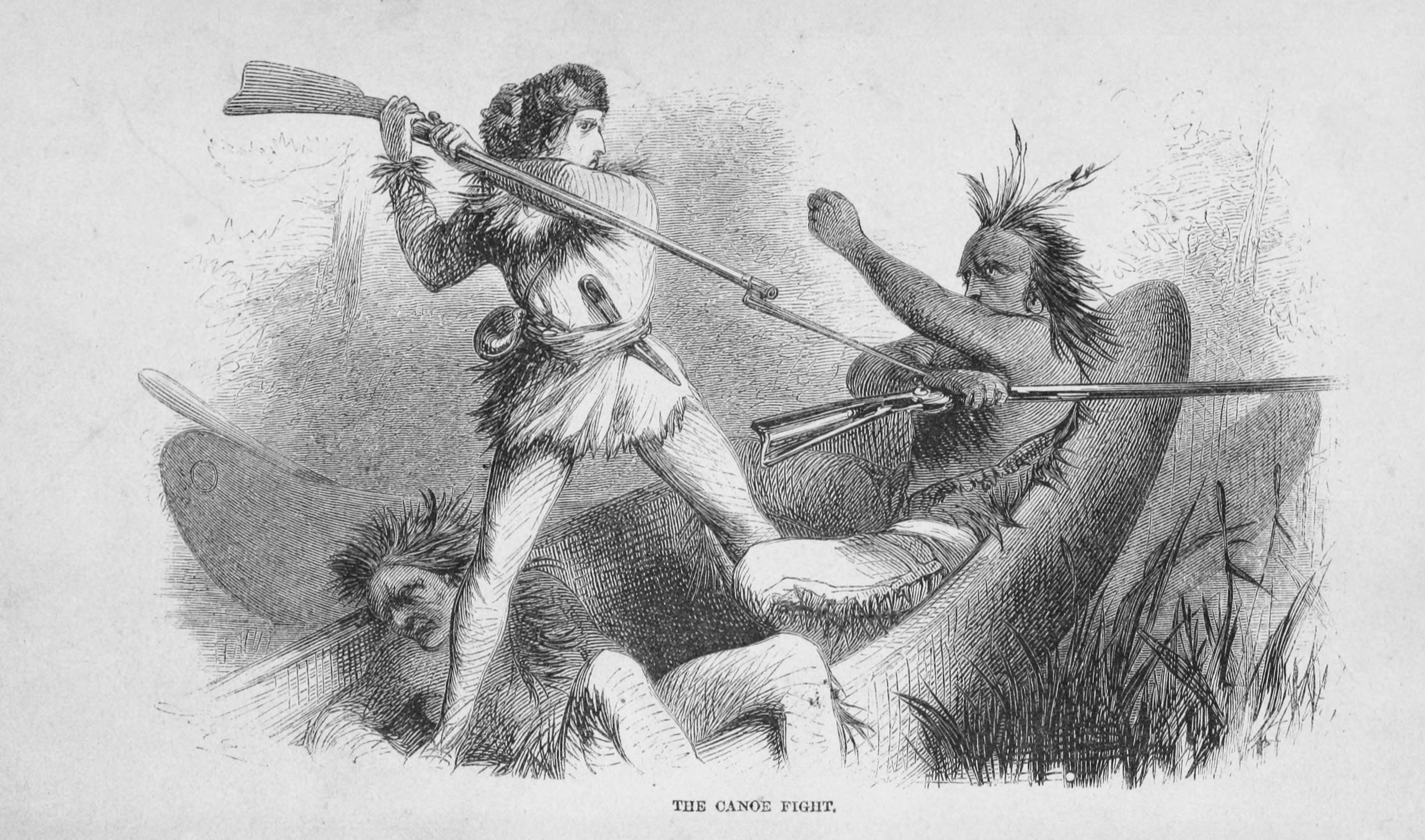
- Artist's impression of the Canoe Fight, from an 1860 biography of Samuel Dale
Date	November 12, 1813
Location	Alabama River, Mississippi Territory
Result	United States victory

Belligerents
United States	Creek

Commanders and leaders
(United States) Samuel Dale	Unknown

Strength
2 war-canoes	1 war-canoe

Casualties and losses
1 wounded 1 war-canoe damaged	10 killed 1 war-canoe captured

The Canoe Fight was a skirmish between Mississippi Territory militiamen led by Captain Samuel Dale and Red Stick warriors that took place on November 12, 1813 as part of the Creek War. The skirmish was fought largely from canoes and was a victory for the militiamen, who only had one member wounded. The victory held little military value in the overall Creek War but its participants gained widespread notoriety for their actions during the fight. The fight has been depicted in multiple illustrations, but only a historical marker currently exists near the site of the fight.

== Background ==
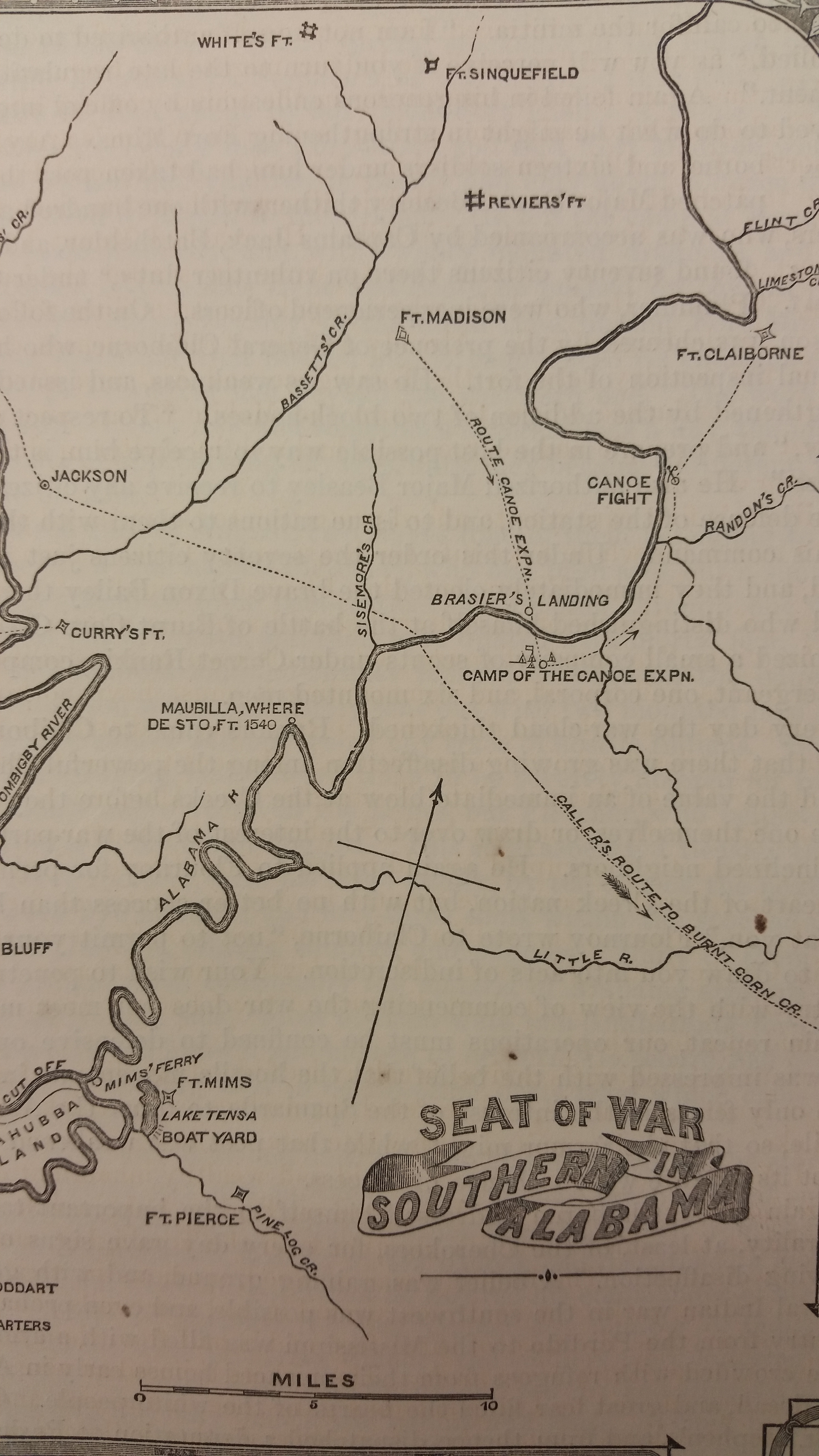
This map of part of Alabama, from an 1868 history of the War of 1812, shows locations marked "Canoe Fight" and "Camp of the Canoe Expedition".

During the Creek War, the United States allied themselves with Creek, Choctaw, and Cherokee warriors who were supportive of the United States in fighting Creeks who were hostile to the United States. The supportive Creeks had championed the enlargement of the Creek governing body known as the National Council and paid off existing debt to the United States by selling Creek lands in present-day Alabama and Georgia. The Creeks who were hostile to the United States, known as Red Sticks, were angered at the growing power of the National Council and felt governmental duties should instead be handled by Creek clans. The Red Sticks were also angered over the selling of traditional Creek lands to the United States and the arrival of settlers on Creek land. Prior to the Creek War, the disagreements over the National Council had led to civil war. The United States hoped to prevent the Red Sticks from allying themselves with Great Britain as part of the War of 1812. Red Stick warriors began sporadically attacking settlers who encroached on Creek lands. In response, citizens of the Mississippi Territory built protective forts in addition to United States military action against the Red Sticks.

After the Fort Mims massacre militias were formed in present-day southern Alabama to protect settlers while they were gathering the fall harvest. Red Stick warriors continued to attack settlers in the area.

Captain Samuel Dale, who was recovering from wounds received at the Battle of Burnt Corn, volunteered to lead a group of 30 Mississippi Territory volunteers and 40 volunteers from the surrounding area to drive away the Red Stick warriors. On November 11, the party left Fort Madison headed southeast towards the Alabama River. They crossed the river at French's Landing (labeled as Brasier's Landing on the map to the right) near modern Gainestown where they camped. After procuring two canoes the party turned northward along the river. Six to eight men remained in the canoes under the command of Jeremiah Austill, while the remainder of the force marched up the eastern bank of the river. Austill spotted a canoe with Red Sticks coming down the river, who soon reversed direction. Firing was then heard near the mouth of Randon's Creek as Dale and his volunteers ambushed a band of warriors who were preparing food, killing one (Dale identified the victim as a métis named Will Milfort, son of Le Clerc Milfort and Jeannet McGillivray, who was Alexander McGillivray's sister). The volunteers began gathering the food and supplies the warriors left behind. Due to difficulty marching up the east bank, Dale ordered the men to cross the river to the west bank. All but twelve men, including Dale, Austill, and James Smith crossed the river. These twelve were preparing some of the captured food when they heard the volunteers from the west bank warn they were surrounded by Creek warriors.

== Battle ==
The volunteers rushed to the river bank but neither canoe had returned from ferrying the other soldiers. They also spotted a canoe with eleven Red Stick warriors descending the river. When the warriors noticed the volunteers, they immediately reversed direction. For an unknown reason, the warriors who had surrounded the soldiers from the east never attacked. Two warriors in the canoe jumped into the river and swam towards the bank. Smith shot and killed one of the warriors.

Dale called for eight of the soldiers on the opposite bank to paddle over in the larger of the two canoes. When these soldiers saw the number of warriors in the canoe, they retreated. The smaller canoe, paddled by a free Black named Caesar, had arrived on the eastern shore. Dale decided to take the smaller canoe into the river to meet the warriors and asked Austill and Smith to accompany him. With Caesar paddling, all three soldiers attempted to fire at the warriors. Austill and Dale's guns failed to fire due to the primer being wet and Smith's shot missed. Caesar continued to paddle towards the warriors' canoe. Before the canoes rammed into each other, the warrior chief reportedly exclaimed "Now for it, Big Sam!", ("Big Sam" being Dale's nickname among the Creeks).

Accounts of the ensuing struggle differ: most accounts report that Austill was struck in the head by the chief with his gun stock. After recovering, Austill was then struck with a war club. Caesar held the boats together while both sides exchanged blows using their rifles as clubs. Austill used the war club that he was attacked with to kill one of the warriors. At one point during the struggle, Dale jumped into the warriors canoe. In addition to bludgeoning the warriors, Dale also used a bayonet during the fight.

All nine Red Stick warriors who remained in the boat were killed. The four Mississippi volunteers all survived, with only Austill receiving significant wounds. After the warriors' bodies were thrown overboard, the remaining warriors on the east bank began shooting at the small canoe's occupants. Dale, Austill, Smith and Caesar reached the eight soldiers who remained on the east bank and were able to return them to the west bank unharmed. The combined group marched two more miles up the west bank, then returned to Fort Madison.

== Aftermath ==
The victory was not of strategic importance in the overall Creek War. Dale became a hero to early Alabamians and was afterwards known as "The Daniel Boone of Alabama." He went on the serve in the Alabama General Assembly and as a brigadier general of the Alabama militia. He later moved to Lauderdale County, Mississippi and died in Daleville, Mississippi. Austill served as a clerk for the Mobile County Court then moved to a plantation in Clarke County where he died in 1879. Smith continued to fight in skirmishes during the Creek War then moved to Mississippi prior to his death. Sources differ concerning Caesar's life after the skirmish: Austill stated that he remained with the Creek métis Josiah Fisher until his death ten years after the fight while Henry S. Halbert wrote that he was sold to Dale before dying in Kemper County, Mississippi in 1866.

== Legacy ==
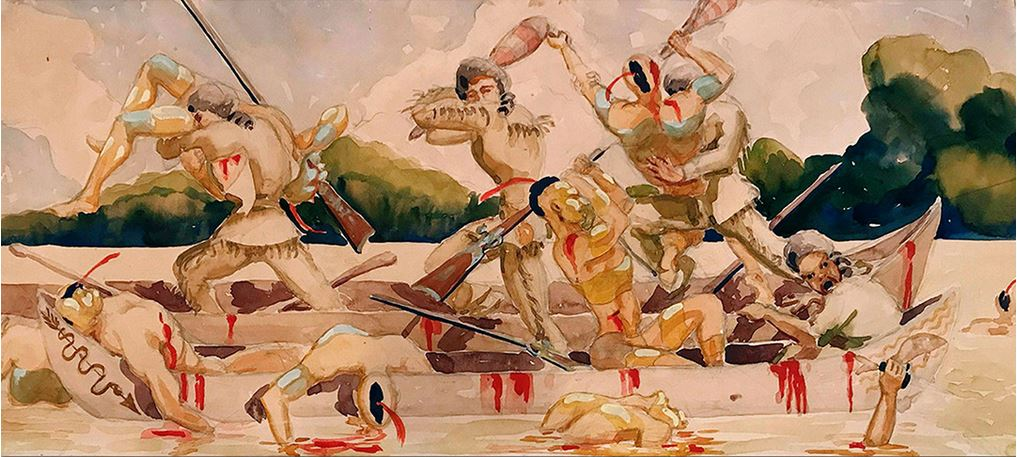
1938 study for a mural proposed by John Kelly Fitzpatrick

The Canoe Fight was chosen as the subject for two New Deal murals. In 1938, John Kelly Fitzpatrick created a mural study for the post office at Ozark, Alabama, that was not accepted. John Augustus Walker was commissioned to paint a collection of murals for Mobile's Old City Hall in 1936 that showed Austill and Caesar during the fight.

The exact site of the skirmish is unknown. The canoe fight occurred near where Randon's Creek joins the Alabama River. The site where the warriors surrounded the twelve militiamen on the east bank has been confirmed and is located on private property. A historical marker that describes the Canoe Fight is located near Barlow Bend.

== Sources ==
- Braund, Kathryn E. Holland (2012). Tohopeka: Rethinking the Creek War & the War of 1812. Tuscaloosa, Alabama: University of Alabama Press. ISBN 978-0-8173-5711-5.
- Halbert, Henry; Ball, Timothy (1895). The Creek War of 1813 and 1814. Chicago, Illinois: Donohue & Henneberry. ISBN 9781375702775.
- Jackson, Harvey (1995). Rivers of History. Tuscaloosa, Alabama: University of Alabama. ISBN 0-8173-0771-0.
- Lossing, Benson (1868). The Pictorial Field-Book of the War of 1812. New York, New York: Harper & Brothers. ISBN 9780781251136.
- Pickett, Albert James (1878). History of Alabama, and Incidentally of Georgia and Mississippi, from the Earliest Period. Tuscaloosa, Alabama: Willo Publishing Company. ISBN 978-1363310845.
- Waselkov, Gregory A. (2006). A Conquering Spirit: Fort Mims and the Redstick War of 1813-1814. Tuscaloosa, Alabama: University of Alabama. ISBN 0-8173-1491-1.
