= Fort Sinquefield =

- U.S. National Register of Historic Places
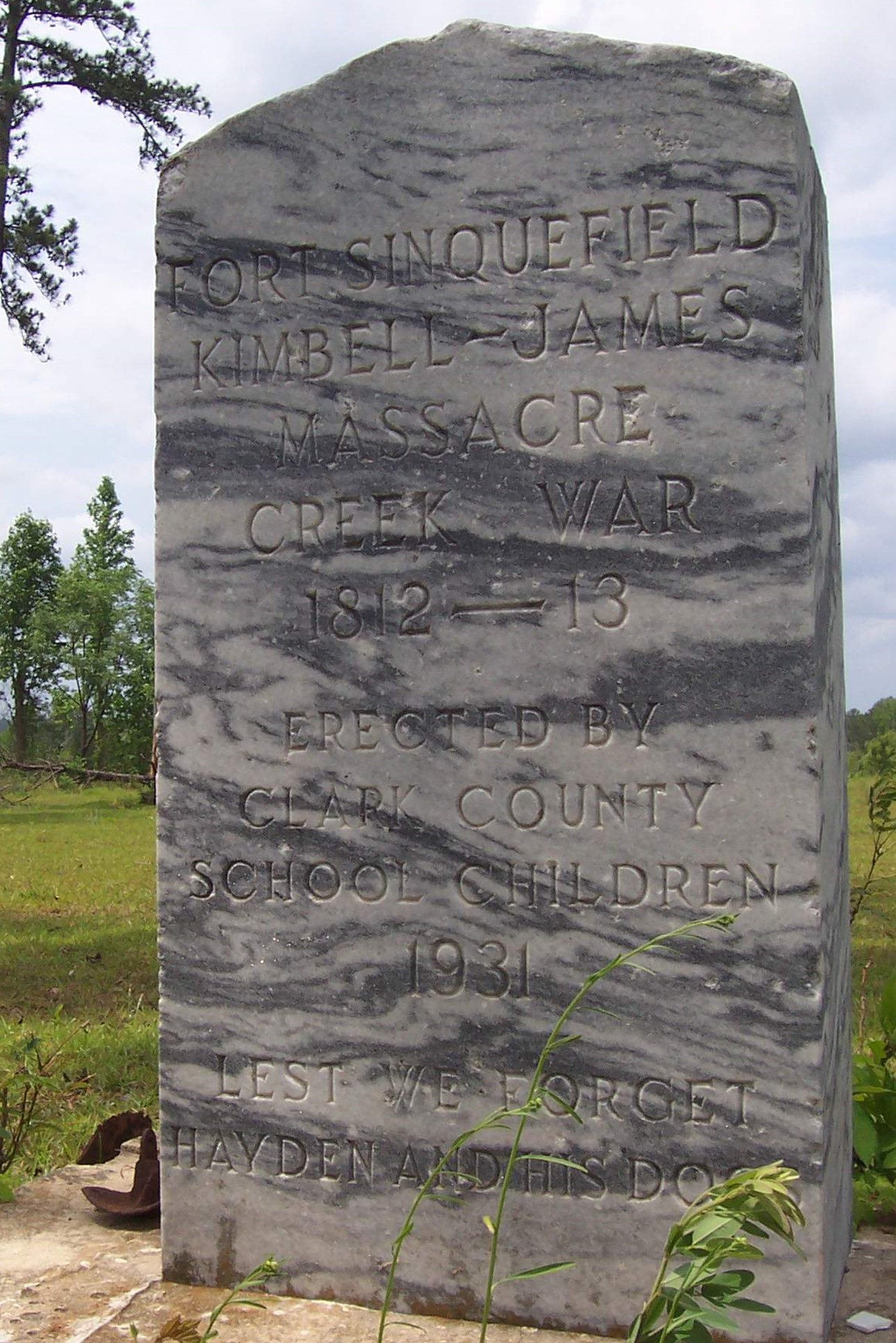

- Location within Alabama Location within the United States
- Location: Clarke County, Alabama, US
- Nearest city: Grove Hill, Alabama
- Coordinates: 31°39′28″N 87°43′39″W
- Built: 1813
- NRHP reference No.: 74000403
- Added to NRHP: December 31, 1974

Fort Sinquefield is the historic site of a wooden stockade fortification in Clarke County, Alabama, United States, near the modern town of Grove Hill. It was built by early Clarke County pioneers as protection during the Creek War and was attacked in 1813 by Creek warriors.

A marker was erected at the site by Clarke County school children in 1931 and it was added to the National Register of Historic Places on December 31, 1974.

== History ==
At the time of the Creek War, originally a civil war within the Creek nation, Clarke was a newly formed county in the Mississippi Territory. The Creek were divided between traditionalists in the Upper Towns and those who had adopted more European-American customs in the Lower Towns. Chiefs of the towns disagreed about the uses of communal land and other issues. The first hostilities of the war that involved Americans occurred nearby during the Battle of Burnt Corn, where Mississippi Territory militia attacked the Red Sticks on July 27, 1813.

The next month, the Red Sticks on August 30, 1813 attacked Fort Mims, garrisoned by the Tensaw Creek. The Red Sticks believed the Tensaw had left behind core Creek values. They killed most of the several hundred people assembled inside Fort Mims, who included Lower Town Creek, intermarried whites and slaves, and other settlers, in an event that became known as the Fort Mims massacre.

Fort Sinquefield was used as a refuge by several pioneer families and friendly Lower Creek after the attack on Fort Mims. On September 1, 1813, Red Stick warriors led by Josiah Francis (Hillis Hadjo), a.k.a. Francis the Prophet, attacked the Ransom Kimbell and Abner James families, who had left the crowded fort for Kimbell's cabin nearby. Most of the men escaped back to the fort, but twelve women and children were killed and scalped in what became known as the Kimbell-James Massacre. The bodies were retrieved for burial outside the fort the next day.

The Red Sticks attacked a second time that day, catching several woman who were washing clothes at a spring away from the fort. They attempted to cut the women off from the fort, but were thwarted by settlers who released their 60 dogs from the fort. The Creek killed one woman, Sarah Phillips. The other settlers gained the fort, from where they fired at the Red Sticks. Casualties of the conflict included several warriors as well as the settler Stephen Lacey. The attack lasted two hours before the Red Sticks retreated. The survivors abandoned Sinquefield soon after, moving to the larger Fort Madison, several miles to the south.

== See also ==
- Choctaw Corner
