= Ferdinand Claiborne =

American militia officer (1772–1815)

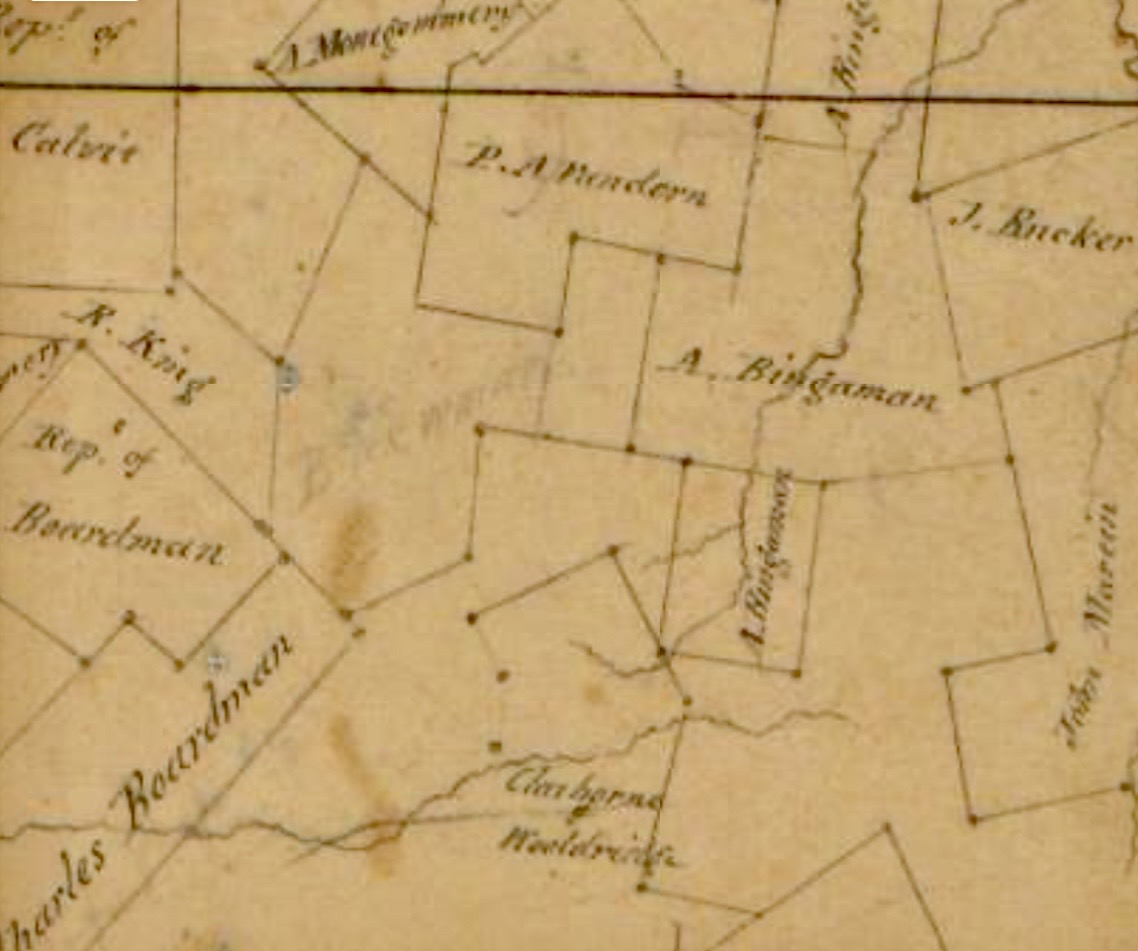
- 1810 map of Adams County, Mississippi Territory showing location of store of Claiborne & Wooldridge
- Born: March 9, 1772; Sussex County, Colony of Virginia
- Died: March 22, 1815 (aged 43); Natchez, Mississippi Territory
- Relatives: William C. C. Claiborne (brother), Thomas A. Claiborne (brother)
- Military career
- Allegiance: United States
- Branch: Legion of the United States; United States Volunteers
- Service years: 1793-1801; 1806-1815
- Rank: Brigadier general
- Conflicts: Northwest Indian War; Battle of Fallen Timbers; Creek War; Battle of Holy Ground

Ferdinand Leigh Claiborne (March 9, 1772 – March 22, 1815) was an American military officer most notable for his command of the militia of the Mississippi Territory during the Creek War and the War of 1812.

== Early life ==
Born in Sussex County, Virginia, Claiborne was a descendant of Colonel William Claiborne (1600–1677), who was born in Crayford, Kent, England and settled in the Colony of Virginia. He was one of four sons of "William Claiborne, of Richmond, Va. [who] was married to Miss Mary Leigh, an aunt of Hon. Benjamin Watkins Leigh, United States Senator from Virginia...Ferdinand Leigh Claiborne, Gov. William Charles Cole Claiborne, Dr. Thomas A. Claiborne, and "the Hon. N. H. Claiborne, who was for twenty years a member of Congress from Virginia".

He began his military service when appointed an ensign in 1793 in the 1st Sub-Legion. Promoted to lieutenant in 1794, Claiborne fought at the Battle of Fallen Timbers, under the command of General Anthony Wayne. With the end of the Northwest Indian War, Claiborne served as a recruiter in Richmond and Norfolk, before returning to the Northwest Territory to serve as acting adjutant-general. Promoted to captain in 1799, Claiborne resigned his commission on 1 January 1802 and moved to Natchez, Mississippi.

== Mississippi Territory ==
At the time of his move to Natchez, Claiborne's brother William C. C. Claiborne was serving as governor and superintendent of Indian affairs for the Mississippi Territory.

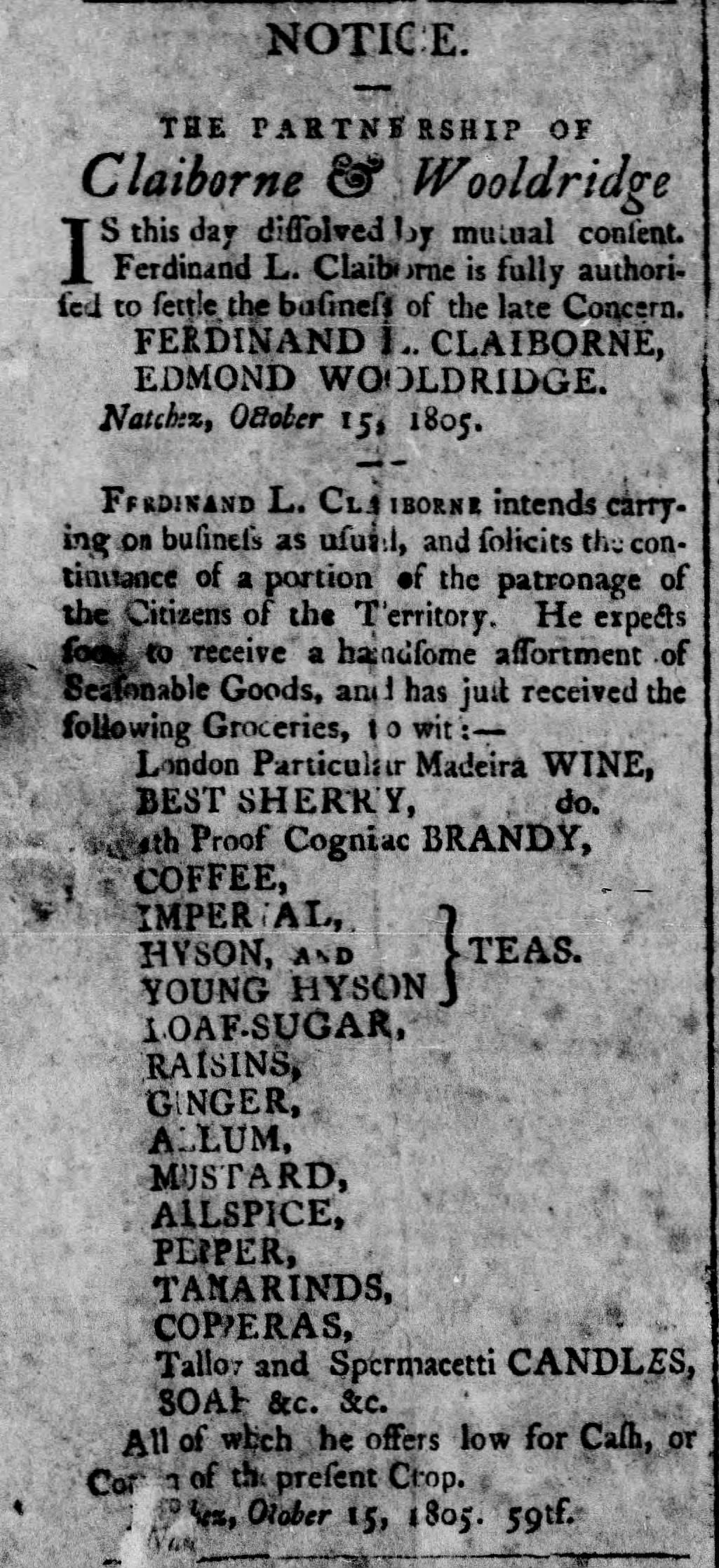
"Notice: The partnership of Claiborne & Wooldridge" The Mississippi Messenger, October 15, 1805

Elected in 1804 to serve in the 3rd General Assembly of the Mississippi Territory, Claiborne experienced a rapid rise in prominence. In July 1804 he announced in the Natchez newspaper that he and Edmund Wooldridge were becoming business partners. As of 1805, Ferdinand Claiborne had a dry goods store in the Natchez District in partnership with Edmond Wooldridge. They announced a dissolution of the partnership in October 1805, while Claiborne carried selling assorted foodstuffs and sundries including Madeira wine, coffee, soap, tamarinds, and spermacetti candles.

Appointed colonel of the Militia of Adams County, in 1806 Claiborne was ordered to march a unit in support of General James Wilkinson during the Sabine expedition. On November 30, 1806, he dueled Captain Benjamin Farar on the Vidalia sandbar; they shot at each other "with a brace of dueling pistols at ten paces. After two rounds were fired without damage to either party, the challenger declared that his honor was satisfied." The feud continued into 1807, in part because Farar "considered Claiborne an arrogant martinet". A dispute involving Farar, Claiborne, and Governor Williams and review of militia troops led to the revocations of Claiborne's commissions as militia colonel and magistrate. Claiborne's former business partner Wooldridge died at age 32 in June 1807 at the White Apple Village after a year's illness. In October 1807 local planter and politician Joseph Sessions wrote to James Madison requesting intervention in the matter of Claiborne's commission.

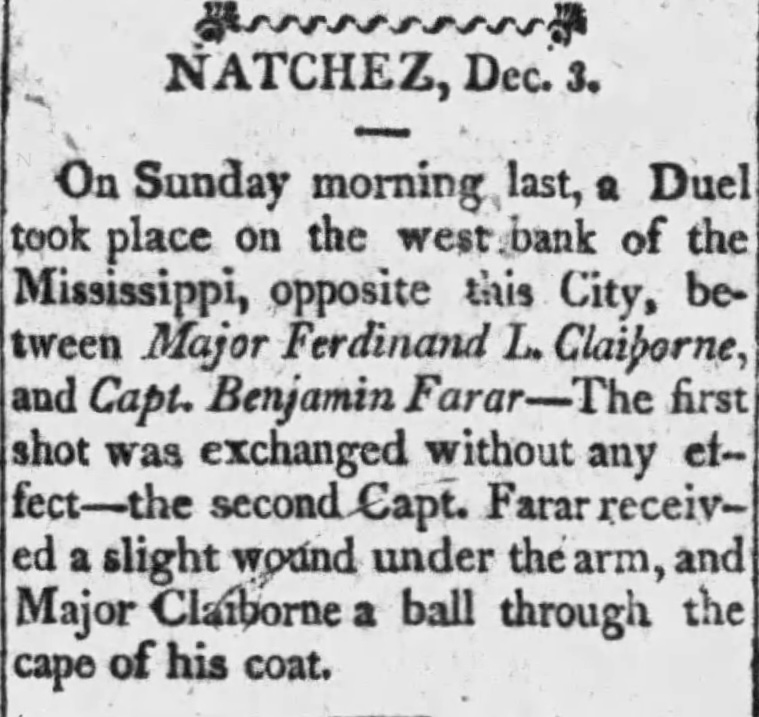
"Natchez, Dec. 3" The Impartial Review and Cumberland Repository, Nashville, Tennessee, December 27, 1806

In January 1807 he advertised for sale "two women and five children, two of them of sufficient size to pick cotton...to be sold low and a credit given until 1st March next."

In 1809, he was founding investor of the Bank of Mississippi, which was the fifth bank chartered west of the Appalachian mountains, and the largest single investor with a holding of $11,400.

As of 1812 he was a director of the Bank of Mississippi, capitalized at $500,000, along with Stephen Minor, Samuel Postlethwaite, William Shields, Wm. Brooks, John Hankerson, Lyman Harding, Wm. G. Forman, Jeremiah Hunt, Lewis Evans, Jas. McIntosh, Thos. Wilkins, and Jas. C. Wilkins.

== War of 1812 and Creek War ==
A change of territorial administrations led to Governor Holmes asking the President of the United States to commission Claiborne as a Brigadier General of the militia of the territory. Supported by the legislature in 1809, this appointment was made in 1811. When war was declared in 1812 Claiborne was made a colonel of Mississippi Volunteers, United States Volunteers. Promoted to brigadier general of volunteers in March 1813, he became the force's commander.

=== Creek War ===
United States military involvement in the Creek War began on 27 July 1813. A unit of Mississippi Territory militia intercepted and engaged a group of Red Stick Creeks. This engagement, known as the Battle of Burnt Corn raised tensions considerably within the territory.

In July 1813, Claiborne was ordered to Fort Stoddert to defend the eastern part of Mississippi Territory from the Creeks. Claiborne expected the Creek to seek revenge for the previous battle. Knowing that he did not have the resources for a full-scale offensive against the Creek, he instead dispatched troops to reinforce various frontier forts, including Fort St. Stephens and Fort Glass. Claiborne assigned Major Daniel Beasley to take less than 200 militiamen to reinforce forts along the Tensaw River. Beasley distributed about 50 of his troops to various forts along the river and stationed the remaining 120 at Fort Mims. This decision turned out to be a fateful one as Beasley, his troops, and many of the settlers and mixed race Creek sheltering in the fort were killed during the Massacre of Fort Mims on 30 August 1813. Claiborne was initially blamed for the massacre. However, Beasley took few precautions despite the likelihood of an attack. The day before the attack Beasley disregarded the sighting of Creek warriors by two slaves, after cursory scouting did not find any Creeks.

When news of the massacre reached Claiborne, his command was still in no position to further reinforce the frontier. Brigadier General Thomas Flournoy, commander of the Seventh Military District, based in New Orleans, authorized Claiborne to call up more militia to augment his force. He was ordered to march his newly augmented force to the confluence of the Alabama and Tombigbee Rivers engaging any Creek forces encountered. Claiborne spent approximately one month at Fort Easley combing the area for Red Stick warriors. Claiborne then established Fort Claiborne as his base of operations against the Creeks. With the completion of the fort, Claiborne was to be reinforced by army regulars from the 3rd Infantry Regiment and 7th Infantry Regiment.

Claiborne's expected reinforcements were delayed when an administrative change of responsibilities for the Creek campaign occurred. The conflict was taking place in both the Sixth Military District and the Seventh Military District. The decision was made to place the conflict under the command of the Sixth Military District. Taking offense, Flournoy, the Seventh District commander called his regulars back to New Orleans and dismissed from federal service the Mississippi Dragoon Regiment. Claiborne's initial protest was met by a reprimand from Flournoy, but Claiborne's persistence led to the Third Infantry joining the campaign.

With the addition of the regulars, Claiborne began his campaign in November 1813 with a combined force of 1200 troops. The campaign's objective was the Creek settlement at Econochaca. Also known as the Holy Ground, this settlement served as a safe haven and base of operations for William Weatherford. Creek prophets claimed to have placed a protective barrier around the town to kill any white man who crossed the barrier. As Claiborne marched on Econochaca, he established forts to protect the rear of his force. On 23 December 1813, Claiborne attacked Econachca. The ensuing Battle of Holy Ground marked a defeat for the Creeks. After Claiborne's force foraged for food, they burned the rest of the town. The following day Claiborne's force fought another brief engagement and burned another Creek town.

=== Aftermath and effect on the wider war ===
With the Red Sticks on the run and pushed out of his area of operations Claiborne retired to Fort Claiborne. His militia troops' enlistments were due to expire on 1 January 1814. Claiborne resigned his volunteer commission on 17 January 1814. Claiborne's campaign had a significant impact on the Creek War. By clearing the Alabama River of Red Sticks, and building fortification to keep them out, he forced them to move eastward. This eastward movement nearly coincided with the beginning of the campaign of General Andrew Jackson. This set the stage for the Battle of Horseshoe Bend, which occurred on 27 March 1814, a decisive victory for Jackson, effectively ending the Red Stick resistance.

== Last years and death ==
Claiborne returned to Natchez with his troops in 1814. In March of that year, he resumed his duties as brigadier general of militia. Claiborne made extensive expenditures, of his own money, for the care and transportation of his men. In doing so, he expended nearly all of his fortune. Claiborne died March 22, 1815, at the age of 45.

== Personal life ==
Ferdinand L. Claiborne was married to Magdaline Hutchins, a daughter of Anglo-American settler Anthony Hutchins. Another Hutchins daughter, Mary, was the wife of planter and territorial treasurer Abner Green. After Claiborne's death his widow remarried, to Baptist minister Dr. David Cooper.

== Sources ==
- Agee, Phil (September 2022). Debt-Driven Settlerism: Small Farmers and Bankers in the Trans-Appalachian South, 1800–1820 (Thesis). City University of New York (CUNY) Graduate Center.
- Peoples, Morgan (Fall 1990). "Brawling and Dueling on the North Louisiana Frontier, 1803–1861: A Sketch". North Louisiana Historical Association Journal. 21 (4): 99–108.
- Haynes, Robert V. (2010). The Mississippi Territory and the Southwest Frontier, 1795–1817. Lexington: University Press of Kentucky. ISBN 978-0-8131-2577-0. LCCN 2009053115. OCLC 646068242. Project MUSE book 1412.
