= Battle of Burnt Corn =

1813 Creek War battle

- Part of the Creek War
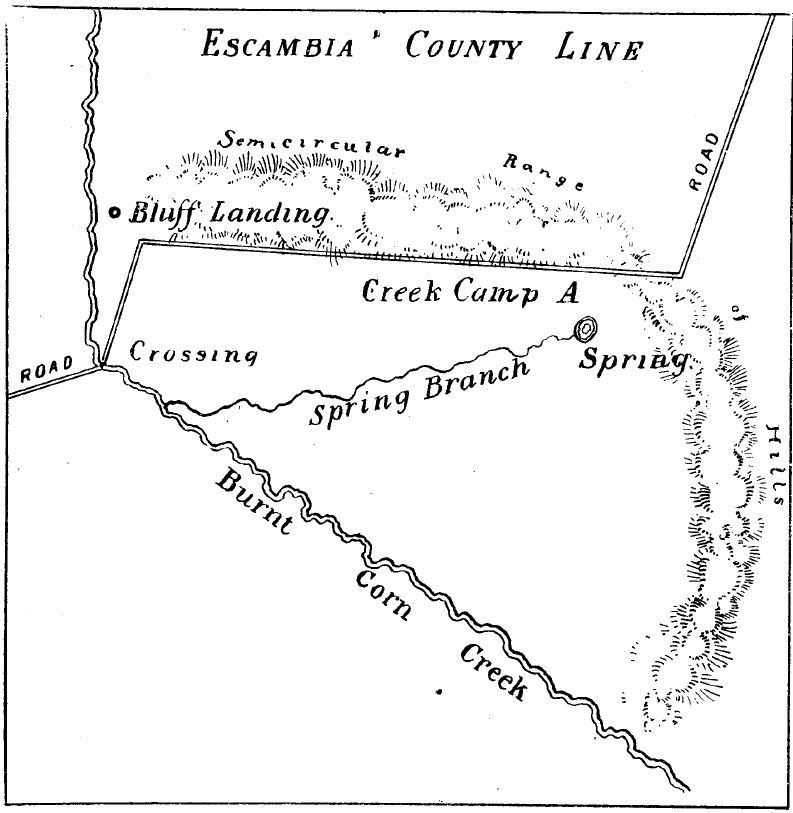
- Sketch of the Burnt Corn battlefield
Date	July 27, 1813
Location	On Burnt Corn Creek in Escambia County, Alabama 31°15′09″N 87°09′27″W
Result	Red Stick victory

Belligerents
Red Sticks (Creek)	United States Volunteers, Mississippi Territory militia

Commanders and leaders
Peter McQueen; High-head Jim	Colonel James Caller

Strength
~60	~180

Casualties and losses
10–12 killed 8–9 wounded	2 killed ~15 wounded
- Location within Alabama Battle of Burnt Corn (the United States)

The Battle of Burnt Corn, also known as the Battle of Burnt Corn Creek, was fought on July 27, 1813, in what is now Escambia County, Alabama, United States. The battle was the first conflict of the Creek War to be fought between American forces and a faction of the Muscogee known as the Red Sticks. The Creek War began as an intratribal conflict between two factions of Muscogee (also known as Creek or Mvskoke), one that supported a centralized tribal government and cooperation with the United States government and the other (known as Red Sticks) that opposed the encroachment of American settlers and championed a return to the traditional Muscogee lifestyle. A group of Red Sticks traveled to Pensacola to obtain weapons and supplies from the Spanish to further their fight.

On their return, the Red Sticks were ambushed by a mixed force composed of Mississippi Territory Volunteers, local militia, and mixed-blood Muscogee (who were of European and Muscogee ancestry). The mixed force temporarily held the element of surprise but the Red Sticks regrouped and eventually drove them from the field. Ten to twelve Red Sticks were killed, and they lost most of the ammunition and supplies they had obtained in Spanish Florida. Even so, the battle was a victory for the Red Sticks when the combined American force retreated.

The battle held little overall strategic importance, but escalated the Creek War from an intratribal conflict into a broader conflict that involved multiple countries and became a regional part of the War of 1812. Multiple participants in the Battle of Burnt Corn were subsequently involved in the Fort Mims massacre, which was a retaliatory attack carried out by the Red Sticks on American settlers. Additional fighting ensued over the next year, culminating in the Battle of Horseshoe Bend, the signing of the Treaty of Fort Jackson, and the eventual removal of most of the Muscogee from Alabama and Georgia.

== Background ==
The Creek War (also known as the Red Stick War) began as a civil war within the Muscogee Confederacy. The Muscogee traditionally inhabited most of modern-day Alabama, parts of western Georgia, and northern Florida. The tribe was primarily split into two divisions: the Upper Towns, consisting of towns (Creek: talwa) along the Alabama, Tallapoosa and Coosa Rivers and the Lower Towns, located along the Chattahoochee River. Under the direction of U.S. Indian agent Benjamin Hawkins, the Creek National Council was formed as a centralized form of tribal government that evolved from the regional meetings of tribal chiefs (micos). The National Council began selling tribal hunting lands to satisfy Muscogee debts, which angered many tribal members. In addition, the traditional Muscogee hunting and trading economy was being slowly replaced by a market economy that focused on farming and agriculture. Due to decline in traditional supply sources, most Muscogee were forced to trade with the United States government or private firms such as Panton, Leslie & Company (and later John Forbes and Company). Simultaneously, American settlers began encroaching on Muscogee lands—a process that was hastened by the construction of the Federal Road. A portion of the traditional Muscogee territory was claimed by the state of Georgia, but much of modern-day Alabama remained under Muscogee control.

In 1811, the Shawnee leader Tecumseh traveled to what is now the southern United States in an attempt to recruit local tribes to join his confederacy. Tecumseh shared the sentiment of many Muscogee and sought to resist American encroachment and return Native Americans to their traditional way of life. After meeting with the Shawnee, a band of Muscogee warriors attacked and killed settlers near the Duck River in modern-day Tennessee. Hawkins pressured the National Council, led by Big Warrior (Tustanagee Thlucco), to hold these Muscogee responsible for their murders. In January 1813, an additional group of settlers were murdered by Muscogee (who were mostly from the Upper Creek towns). Hawkins again demanded a response, and the National Council sent a group of warriors—led by William McIntosh (Tustunnuggee Hutke)—to punish the murderers. Traditionally, this punishment was handled by the talwa instead of the National Council. A faction of Muscogee known as the Red Sticks (for the atássa, the traditional weapon that was painted red, the Muscogee color symbolizing war), opposed the Council's action and began assaulting Tukabatchee, where Big Warrior lived. Big Warrior had Red Sticks simultaneously attacked members of the Upper Towns who supported the National Council and slaughtered domesticated livestock. Red Sticks began to exert control over the Upper Creek villages, while those who opposed them fled to Lower Creek towns in the Chattahoochee Valley and Tensaw District. Settlers in the Mississippi Territory were worried about impending attacks from Red Sticks, so Volunteer Regiments and militias were formed to protect the settlers. Mixed-blood Muscogee had benefited from adoption of American practices, and many of their plantations were destroyed by Red Sticks.

== Prelude ==
During the War of 1812, the United States (along with allied Native American tribes), fought against the United Kingdom, Spain, and various Native American tribes. Early in the conflict, the United States was concerned British and Spanish forces were supplying weapons and inciting Muscogee to fight against American settlers. It was feared these attacks would open a new theater of the War of 1812 along the Gulf South.

In January 1813, Little Warrior (Tvstvnvkuce), traveled with a band of Muscogee warriors to fight alongside Tecumseh's warriors at the Battle of Frenchtown. These Muscogee then purportedly traveled on to Canada and received a packet or letter with directions from the British for the Muscogee to go to Spanish West Florida to receive guns and ammunition from the Spanish to attack American settlers. In the summer of 1813, approximately 300 Red Stick warriors, led by Peter McQueen of Talisi, High-head Jim of Atasi, and Josiah Francis (Hillis Hadjo) traveled to Pensacola to meet with the Governor of Spanish West Florida Mateo González Manrique to obtain these weapons and supplies. En route to Pensacola, the Red Sticks burned multiple mixed-blood Muscogee plantations, including those of James Cornells, Samuel Moniac (father of David Moniac), and Leonard McGee. Moniac reported to American authorities that High-head Jim told him the Red Sticks planned to travel to Pensacola and obtain weapons to begin attacking white settlers. In addition to burning Cornells's plantation, the Red Sticks took his wife hostage and planned to sell her as a slave on their arrival at Pensacola.

The Red Sticks arrived in Pensacola on July 20, 1813, seeking to ally themselves with Spain and Great Britain. To their dismay, González claimed he had no weapons but did offer ammunition, gunpowder, and other supplies, including flour, corn, blankets, razors, and knives. Enraged at the lack of expected weapons, the Red Sticks unsuccessfully attempted to acquire supplies from John Innerarity, who managed the John Forbes and Company trading house in Pensacola. Innerarity also claimed he had no weapons to furnish the Red Sticks but did give them clothing and blankets. By July 23 or 24, the Red Sticks left Pensacola with a considerably smaller body of warriors than when they arrived, leaving in multiple groups so as not to risk capture of the entirety of their supplies.

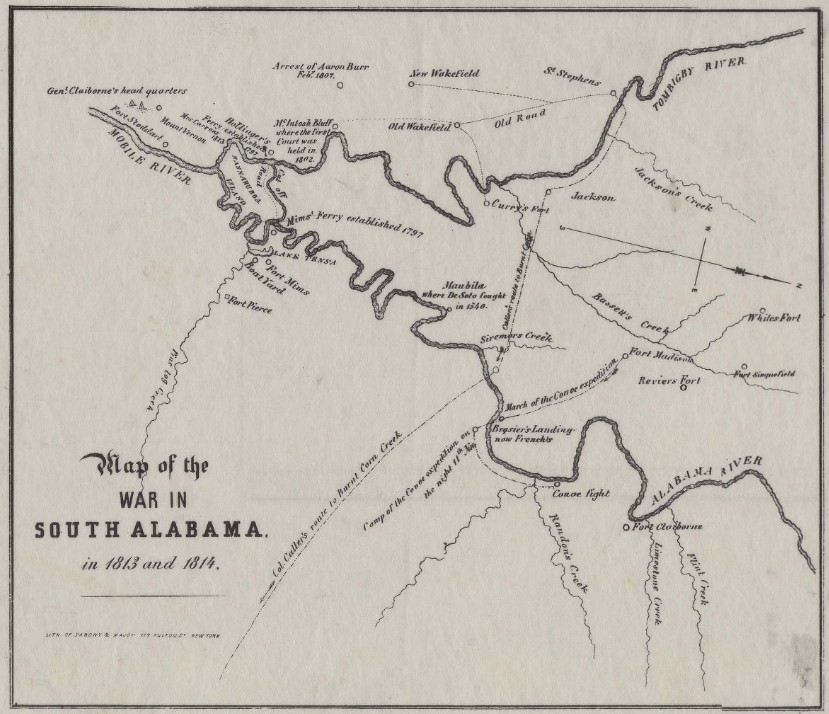
1851 map showing the route of Col. Caller's militia to the Battle of Burnt Corn

After being notified of the Red Sticks' plans by Moniac, Colonel Joseph Carson, the commander of Fort Stoddert, sent David Tate (half-brother of William Weatherford and nephew of Alexander McGillivray), and William Peirce (a resident of the Tensaw), to spy on the Red Sticks in Pensacola. Tate and Peirce reported to Judge Harry Toulmin on July 22 and 23, respectively, on what they had observed in Pensacola. Colonel James Caller, who commanded all the Mississippi Territory forces east of the Pearl River, immediately mustered the 15th Regiment of Mississippi Territorial Volunteers without waiting for orders from General Ferdinand Claiborne. Caller began assembling a force with the plan of intercepting the Red Sticks as they returned from Pensacola. Caller commanded six companies of Mississippi Territory Volunteers and militia from Washington County and set out from St. Stephens. They marched to the area of modern-day Jackson, Alabama, then met militia under the command of Samuel Dale at Fort Glass. On July 24, this group crossed the Alabama River near present-day Gainestown and proceeded to Tate's cowpen, where they were joined by militia from present-day Baldwin County. The Baldwin militia included many mixed-blood Muscogee, including Tate, Cornells, and their commander, Captain Dixon Bailey. The total force included approximately 180 mounted men armed with rifles, shotguns and muskets. Many of the American force—including Caller—held political aspirations, causing the assembled force to have an unnecessarily large number of officers. In total, the combined force contained four captains and multiple lieutenants, and on the morning of the battle elected William McGrew as Lieutenant Colonel, along with four new majors.

On July 26, the force marched up the Federal Road toward Burnt Corn Springs. The next day, scouts located the Red Stick group on the Wolf Trail at a ford over Burnt Corn Creek preparing their mid-day meal. The Wolf Trail began near modern-day Belleville, Alabama, as a branch of the Indian Trading Path to Mobile that ultimately led to Pensacola. The combined force of Volunteers and militia proceeded in a southerly direction down the Wolf Trail and reached the ford unobserved between 10:00 AM and noon.

== Battle ==
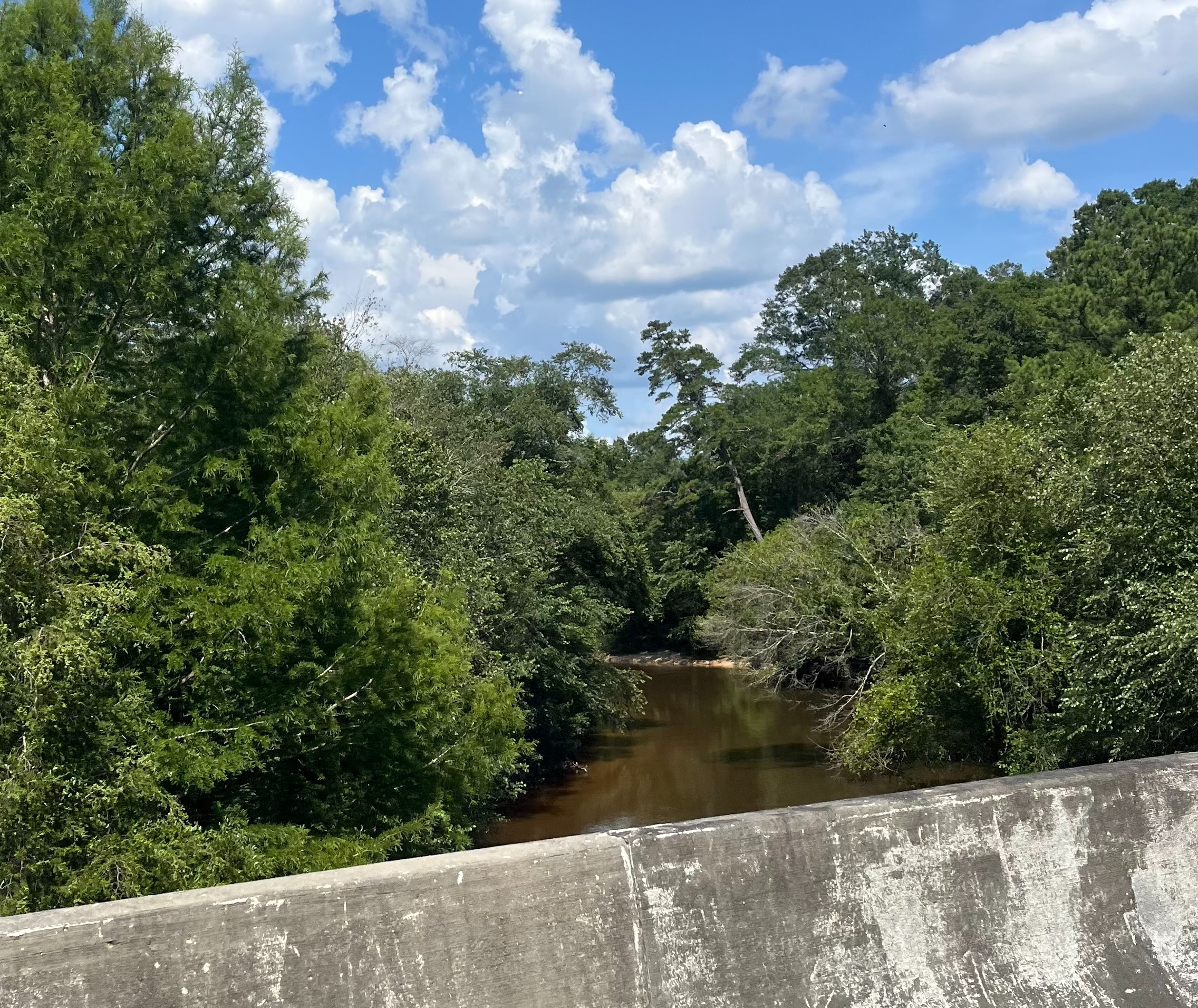
Burnt Corn Creek in Escambia County, Alabama

The Red Sticks were surprised by the initial American attack. The Americans charged on horseback and killed a Muscogee woman and an enslaved African who was fleeing to the Americans. One American was killed and 8–10 Red Stick pack horses were quickly captured. Sporadic fighting lasted for 45 minutes to an hour before the Red Sticks were chased into a canebrake.

The Red Sticks rallied and began firing on the Americans, who were concentrated on an exposed, sparsely-covered pine ridge. Colonel G. W. Creagh (who was present at the battle), reported Caller's soldiers showed little interest in fighting while Bailey's men attacked and pursued the Red Sticks, leaving Caller's men to loot the supplies. Red Sticks under McQueen and High-head Jim attacked these looters, causing them to flee the field of battle. After an additional two hours of fighting, Caller gave an order to retreat. A small American rearguard commanded by Captains Dale, Bailey, and Benjamin Smoot, fought the Muscogee counterattack and covered the retreat. An additional American soldier was killed in the retreat.

The Red Sticks suffered 10–12 killed with eight to nine wounded out of a total force of 60, while the Americans lost two soldiers killed and approximately 15 wounded. George Stiggins, a mixed-blood Muscogee who wrote an early history of the tribe, reported the Red Sticks were only armed with 13 guns and traditional weapons.

== Aftermath and preservation ==
The battle was considered a humiliating defeat for the American force, but they did obtain some of the Red Sticks' ammunition, cloth, salt, and other supplies. The Governor of Mississippi Territory David Holmes blamed Caller for the failure of the attack. In addition to commanding the failed attack, Caller and Major James Woods were lost for 15 days after the battle before being found by a search party. For the first two days, they were joined by Private Abner Smith Lipscomb, who eventually served as the second Chief Justice of the Supreme Court of Alabama.

Immediately following the battle, settlers fled to Mobile, St. Stephens, Fort Stoddert, or erected stockades around private homes. Claiborne feared the Red Sticks would begin retaliatory attacks on settlers in the area north of Mobile and ordered Mississippi Territory Volunteers from the Mount Vernon Cantonment to supplement the militias in Fort Mims, Fort Easley, and eventually, Fort Peirce. Fort Mims had been constructed around the home of Samuel Mims after the Red Stick attack on Tukabatchee.

After the battle, Bailey led a group of warriors and damaged McQueen's homestead. Bailey returned to Fort Mims and was elected captain of the Tensaw militia. William Weatherford and Francis planned a retaliatory attack on Forts Mims and Peirce, as many mixed-bloods and participants from the Burnt Corn battle were taking refuge there. The mixed-bloods specifically had guided the mixed American force at the Battle of Burnt Corn, were responsible for most of the Red Stick deaths, and had covered the American force's retreat. The attack on Fort Peirce was never carried out, but most of the inhabitants of Fort Mims were killed by Red Sticks on August 30, 1813, in what became known as the Fort Mims massacre. After the Fort Mims massacre, the Red Sticks faced a three-pronged attack from the United States that culminated in their defeat at the Battle of Horseshoe Bend. This led to the signing of the Treaty of Fort Jackson and the Muscogee's eventual forced removal to Indian Territory.

In 1815, Lewis Sewall (a former official in the Land Office of the Mississippi Territory), published a satirical poem titled The Last Campaign of Sir John Falstaff the II; or, The Hero of the Burnt-Corn Battle: a Heroi-Comic Poem. In the poem, Sewall, who was in a dispute with Caller, compared him to William Shakespeare's character John Falstaff and Don Quixote. The poem was published in St. Stephens and became the first literary work published in what is now Alabama.

In 2011, the American Battlefield Protection Program provided a grant to identify and study Creek War sites, leading to the identification of the approximate site of the Burnt Corn battlefield on private land, but no definitive artifacts have been recovered as of 2012.

== Sources ==
- Beidler, Philip D. (2012). First Books: The Printed Word and Cultural Formation in Early Alabama. Tuscaloosa, Alabama: University of Alabama Press. ISBN 978-0-8173-5730-6.
- Collins, Robert P. (2012). "'A Packet from Canada': Telling Conspiracy Stories on the 1813 Creek Frontier". In Braund, Kathryn E. Holland (ed.). Tohopeka: Rethinking the Creek War & the War of 1812. Tuscaloosa, Alabama: University of Alabama Press. pp. 53–83. ISBN 978-0-8173-5711-5.
- Davis, Karl (2002). ""Remember Fort Mims": Reinterpreting the origins of the Creek War". Journal of the Early Republic. 22 (4): 611–636. doi:10.2307/3124760. JSTOR 3124760.
- Hall, John C. (2014). "Landscape Considerations for the Creek War in Alabama, 1811–1814". The Alabama Review. 67 (3): 219–232. doi:10.1353/ala.2014.0025.
- Martin, Joel W. (1991). Sacred Revolt: The Muskogees' Struggle for a New World. Boston, Massachusetts: Beacon Press. ISBN 0807054038.
- Owsley, Frank Lawrence Jr. (1981). Struggle for the Gulf Borderlands: The Creek War and the Battle of New Orleans, 1812-1815. University Presses of Florida. ISBN 0813006627. OCLC 1151350587.
- Thrower, Robert G. (2012). "Causalities and Consequences of the Creek War: A Modern Creek Perspective". In Braund, Kathryn E. Holland (ed.). Tohopeka: Rethinking the Creek War & the War of 1812. Tuscaloosa, Alabama: University of Alabama Press. pp. 10–29. ISBN 978-0-8173-5711-5.
- Unger, Dallace W. Jr. (2011). Tucker, Spencer C. (ed.). The Encyclopedia of North American Indian Wars, 1607–1890: A Political, Social, and Military History. Santa Barbara, CA: ABC-CLIO. ISBN 9781851096039.
- Waselkov, Gregory A. (2006). A Conquering Spirit: Fort Mims and the Redstick War of 1813–1814. Tuscaloosa, Alabama: University of Alabama. ISBN 0-8173-1491-1.
- Waselkov, Gregory; Christopher, Raven (2012). Archeological Identification of Creek War Sites, Part 2, Sensitive Site Data Redacted (Technical report). Mobile, Alabama: American Battlefield Protection Program and the University of South Alabama. "Technical Report on Grant Agreement No. GA-2255-11-025"
