= Samuel Dale =

American politician (1772–1841)

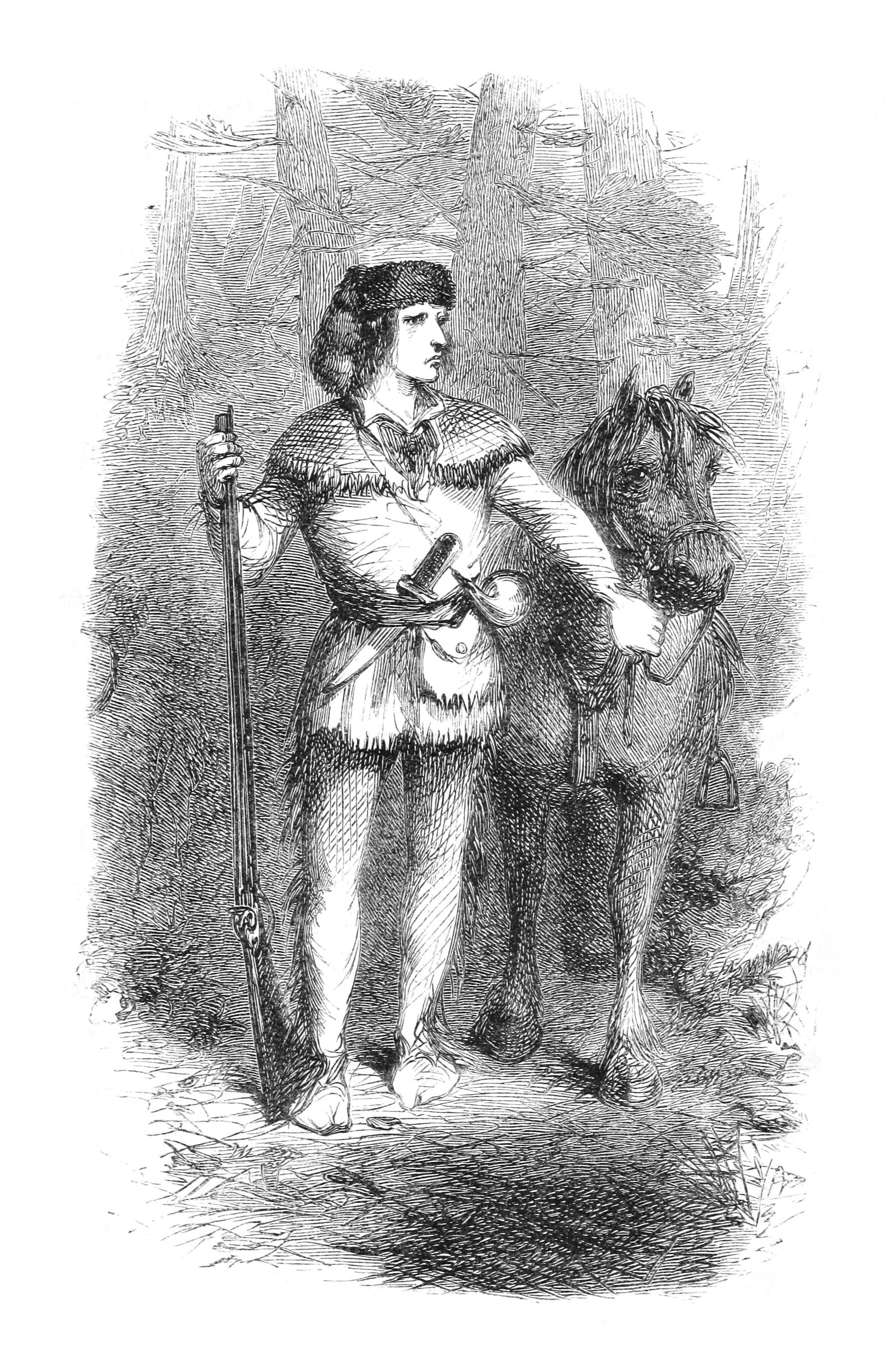
- An 1860 artist's impression of Sam Dale acting as a scout ca. 1795
- Born: 1772; Rockbridge County, Colony of Virginia (present-day Rockbridge County, Virginia)
- Died: May 24, 1841 (aged 68–69); Lauderdale County, Mississippi
- Other names: Daniel Boone of Alabama, Brigadier General Samuel Dale
- Occupations: frontiersman, soldier, politician
- Employer(s): British Government, Pennsylvania State Government, U.S. Government

Samuel Dale (1772 – May 24, 1841), known as the "Daniel Boone of Alabama", was an American frontiersman, soldier, and politician, who fought under General Andrew Jackson in the Creek War and later became a brigadier general in the U.S. Army and an advocate for Alabama statehood.

Samuel Dale was born in 1772, in Rockbridge County, Virginia, to Scotch-Irish parents from Pennsylvania. As a boy, his parents and he moved many times with the westward border expansion, most notably in 1775 and 1783. At the death of his parents in December 1792, he was responsible for the welfare of eight younger siblings. From 1793 to '96, he served as a United States government scout. He abandoned work as a trader between Savannah, Georgia, and the border settlements and as a mill owner-operator to guide immigrants into Mississippi, over Native American lands.

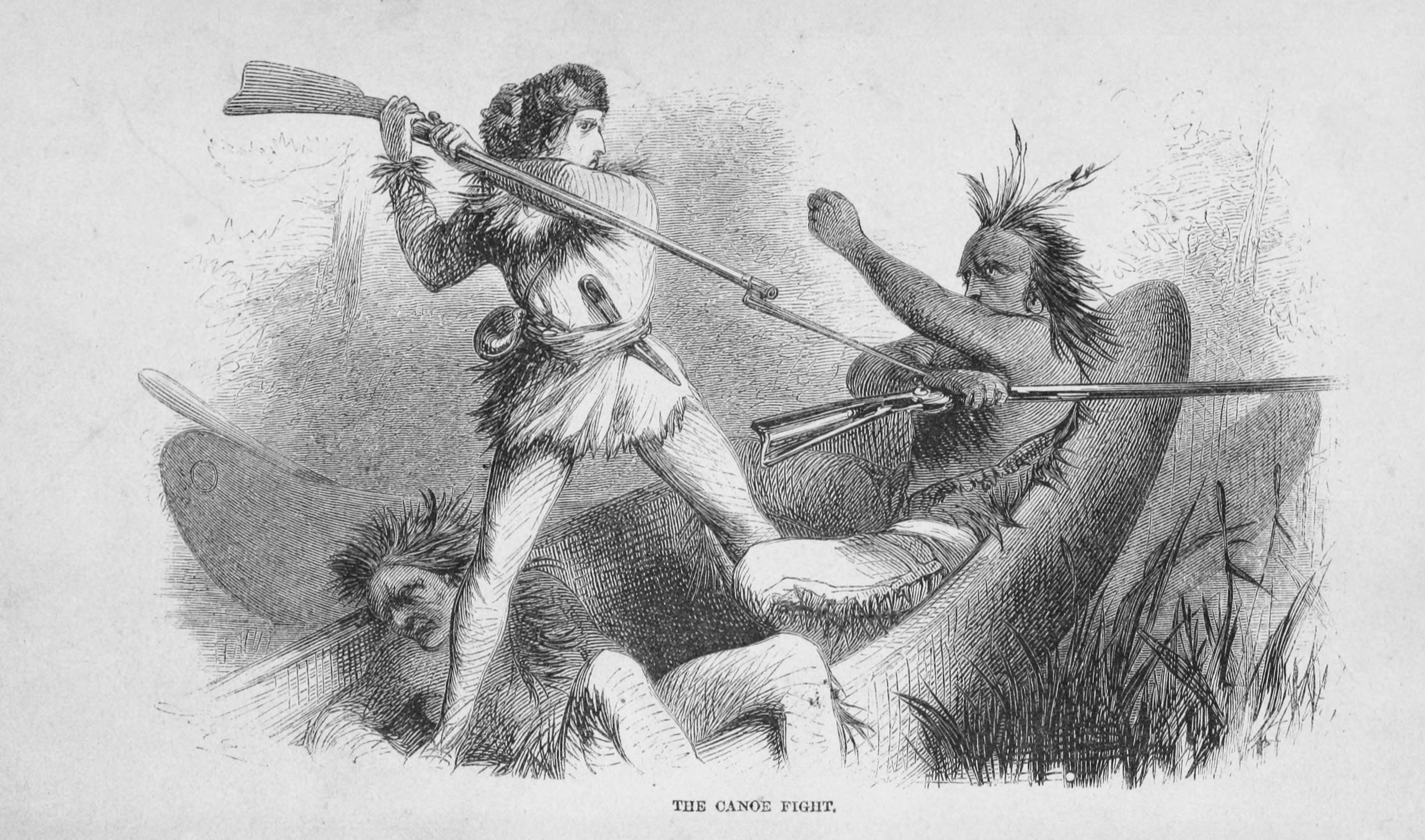
Dale in the 1813 Canoe Fight, with the Creek Nation on the Alabama River, Mississippi Territory

Dale was present in 1811 when Tecumseh enlisted local Alabama Native Americans to fight against Americans, during his campaign to establish a pan-Indian confederacy. Dale was involved in many of these confrontations, particularly in 1814, when he served as a courier bringing documents to Andrew Jackson in New Orleans, from Georgia in just eight days.

== Creek War ==
=== Intercepting and raiding a Creek Supply train ===
On July 27, 1813. Spain, which was an ally of the British, supplied Creek Indian Chief Peter McQueen with provisions, supplies, and gunpowder to resist American expansion. But only enough as to not openly antagonize the United States of America. Peter McQueen and 300 of his Indian warriors were traveling back to their tribal village with their supply train. American militiamen under militia Colonel James Caller and Captain Dixon Bailey headed out to raid the Creek supply train. The American militia was joined by Samuel Dale and his fellow American militiamen numbering a total of at least 180. When the militia reached the location of the supply train, the Creek Indians were making camp and let down their guard. Colonel James Caller and his militia quietly dismounted and cautiously approached the Indian camp. Then, the American militia launched a surprise attack. The Indians were taken completely by surprise. The militia charged in while firing their weapons and the panicked Indians fired back to little effect running off. After the Indians fled, many of the militia let down their guard and immediately started looting the supply train without setting proper security. While most of the militia were distracted and too busy to loot, the Indians regrouped and launched a surprise counter-attack at the militia. At least 80 of the militia including Captains Samuel Dale, Dixon Bailey, and Smoot faced the Indians and bravely fought them. After 3 hours of fighting, the American militia retreated to safety. Though the Creek Indians won tactically, driving off the militia raiders, the militia was able to successfully carry off many of the pack horses and their loads of supplies in their withdrawal back to American lines. The Creek Indians had 10 to 12 killed and eight or nine wounded, while the American militia had only two killed and 15 wounded.

=== Ambushing Creeks in Canoe Fight ===
This ambush by Samuel Dale and his fellow militiamen on British-allied Creek Indians occurred on November 12, 1813. Samuel Dale took charge of Fort Glass, a small stockade about a quarter of a mile from Fort Madison. Dale had at least 50 American partisans under his command. During the day, sentinels were posted around the fort. At night, Dale illuminated the approaches, for a circuit of 100 yards, by a device of his own. Two poles, 50 feet long, were firmly planted on each side of the fort; a long lever, upon the plan of a sell sweep, worked upon each of these poles; to each lever was attached a bar of iron about 10 feet long and to these bars the Americans fastened, with trace-chain, huge parts of light wood. The illumination from such an elevation was brilliant, and no covert attack could be made upon Dale’s position. As a precaution against the Indian torch, Samuel had his blockhouses and their roofs well plastered with clay. The Americans displayed themselves in arms frequently, with the women wearing hats and garments of their husbands, to impress upon the spies that the Americans knew were lurking around an exaggerated notion of American strength. Sometime later, Dale’s scouts brought news of 80 to 100 Indians camped on the east side of Alabama, near what is now called Dale's Ferry. Samuel Dale took 60 militiamen to attack the enemy if practicable. Crossing the river in two canoes, which Samuel Dale previously concealed, the Americans spent the night in the canebrake. At daylight, he manned each canoe with five picked men, and directed them to move cautiously up the river, while the rest of the American militia followed the trail that ran along the bank. When the Americans reached Bailey’s, whose cabins were on the east, and his corn crib and field on the west bank, the Americans discovered two Indian canoes, laden with corn, paddling up stream. Samuel Dale ordered fellow militiaman Jerry Austill to lay his canoes under the bluff and conceal his men from the Indians until Dale could get ahead of them. Dale and his militiamen pushed on at a lively rate, with George Foster and him being 100 yards in advance of the other. At an abrupt turn of the path, they suddenly encountered five warriors. Dale shot one down while Foster shot the next, and the rest broke into the cane break. Afterwards, Dale put 30 of his militiamen on the east bank, while he kept the western bank with 20 militiamen. Soon, he saw 11 Indian warriors in boats. So, Daleand seven militiamen chased the Indians. After intense fighting, Dale and his men killed all 11 Indian warriors. Samuel Dale and his men got their canoes, crossed them all over, and withdrew safely back to their fort.

=== Raiding Creek Villages ===
Samuel Dale rode with Major Cassel’s American horse-mounted militiamen to raid and destroy Creek villages. The militia rode near an upriver and destroyed an enemy Red Stick village at the mouth of Pintlala Creek. These raiders set camp on December 25, 1813. Samuel Dale and his militia then rode on, raiding and destroying other Creek villages and farms in the area. The raiding militia force then rode back to Fort Deposit, and Dale and his fellow militia raiders withdrew back to Fort Clairborne.

== Further career ==
Dale was elected to the first Alabama General Assembly in 1817, serving until 1829. As a legislator and distinguished veteran brigadier general, four other men and he received the visiting Marquis de Lafayette of France into Alabama. A decade later, he was accidentally injured and was not able to carry out the illegal (against a ruling of the U.S. Supreme Court) forced relocation of the local Choctaw-speaking Indians the complete distance from Alabama and Mississippi to their assigned territories in Oklahoma. General Dale was the first elected member of the Mississippi House of Representatives to come from Lauderdale County, Mississippi. He next visited Washington, DC, to request compensation for the supplies that were bought for his troops. He was disappointed when he received no recognition from the federal government.

== Death ==
Dale died on May 24, 1841, in Lauderdale County, Mississippi, and was buried there near Daleville, which was named in his honor. Dale County, Alabama, also is named for him. Fort Dale, which Dale led the construction of, was also named in his honor.

== Gallery ==
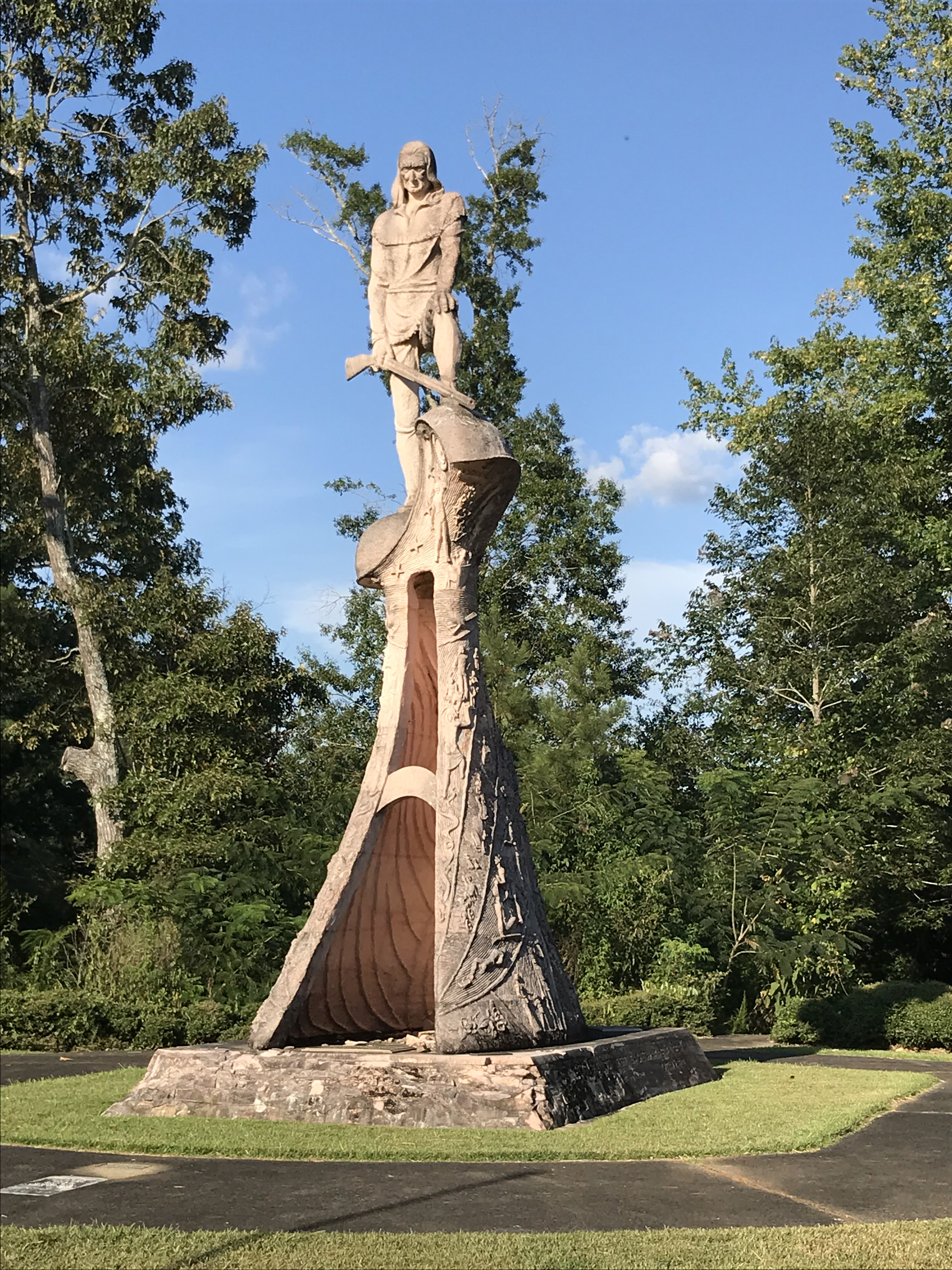
Samuel Dale monument

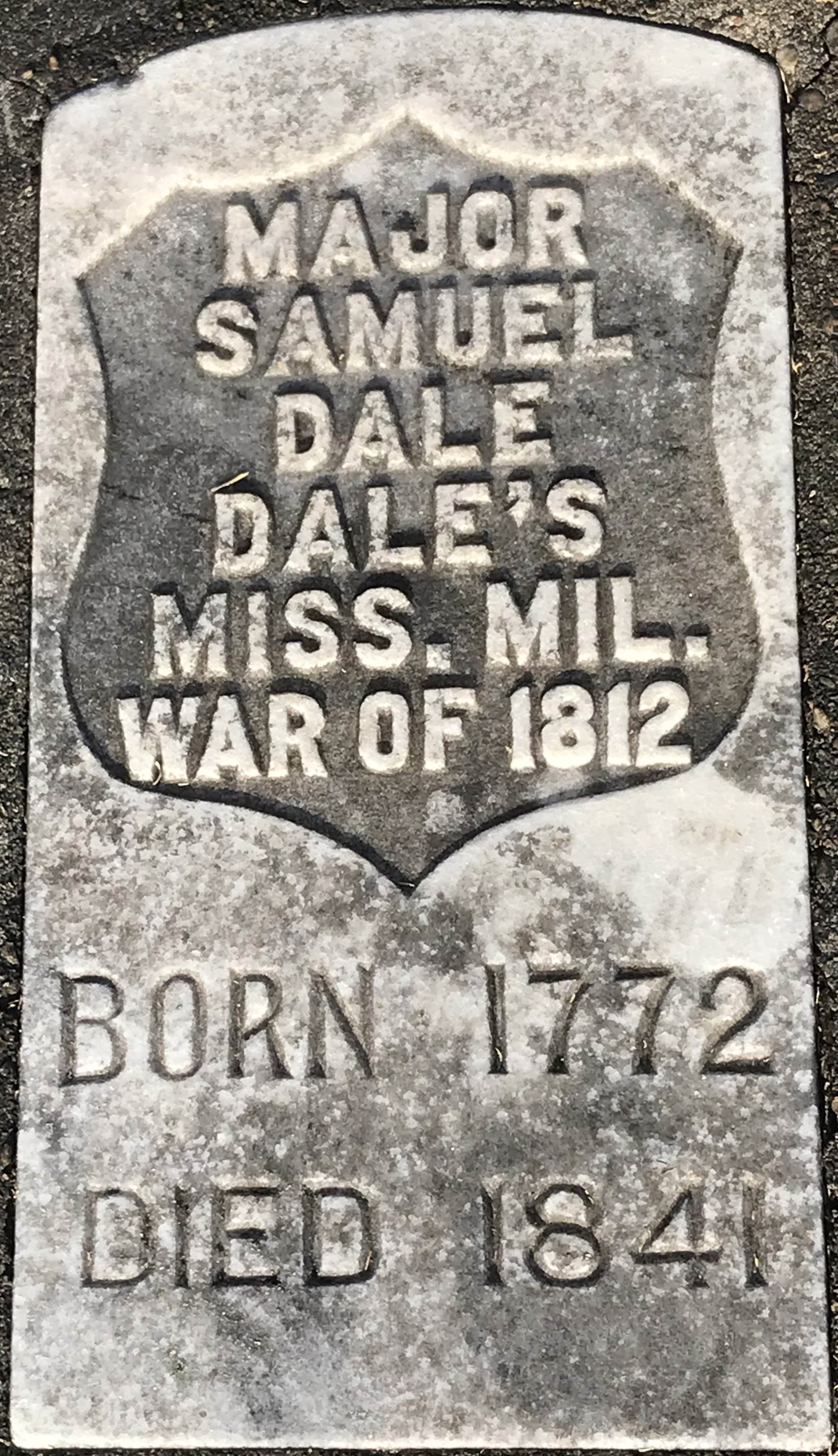

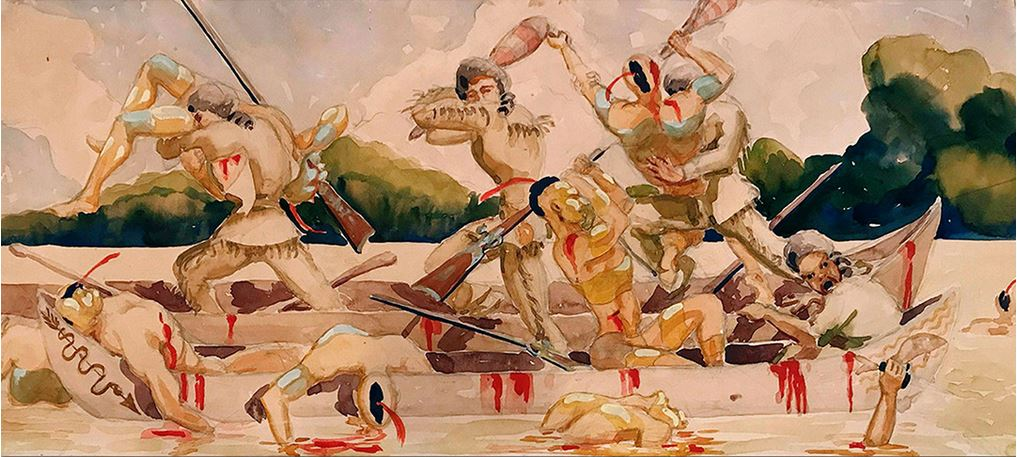
The 1938 mural design proposed by John Kelly Fitzpatrick for the post office at Ozark, Alabama
