= Albert J. Pickett =

American historian

Albert James Pickett
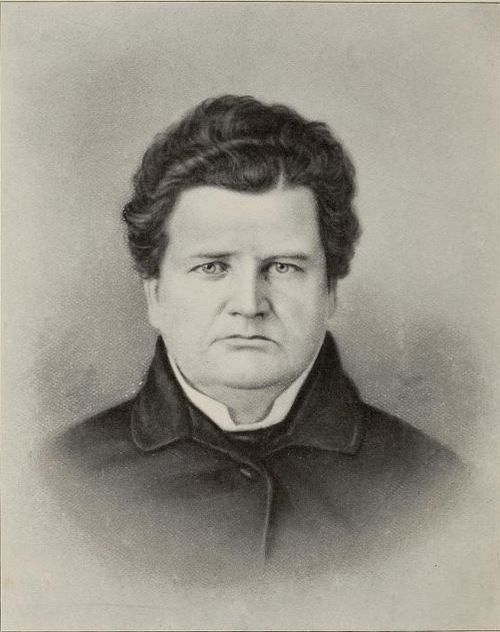
- Born: August 13, 1810; Anson County, North Carolina
- Died: October 28, 1858 (aged 48); Montgomery, Alabama
- Occupation: Historian
- Writing career
- Notable works: History of Alabama and Incidentally of Georgia and Mississippi from the Earliest Period

Albert James Pickett (Anson County, North Carolina, August 13, 1810 — Montgomery, Alabama, October 28, 1858) was a planter and lawyer in Autauga County, Alabama. He is known as Alabama's first historian, having published a two-volume history of the state in 1851.

== Biography ==
At the age of 8, Pickett moved with his father, William R. Pickett, from North Carolina to the frontier of Autauga County, ceded to the United States four years earlier by the Creek Indians in the Treaty of Fort Jackson. It was part of the federal government's effort to extinguish land claims and gain Indian Removal from the Southeast, in order to enable settlement by European Americans.

William Pickett built a home near Autaugaville, and a mill building and trader's post on Swift Creek. While growing up, Albert befriended many of the Creek and frontier traders who frequented his father's store. From them he began to piece together the early history of the state. He later drew from this for his written history, but supplemented accounts with documentation from a variety of sources.

Pickett studied law, but never practiced professionally. He devoted his time to literature, management of a plantation, and historical research. He traveled widely and corresponded with archivists and book dealers in the Atlantic states and Europe in order to document his history of the state. He gained the publication of the two-volume History of Alabama in Charleston, South Carolina in 1851. Pickett was working on a comprehensive history of the Southwest at the time of his death.

== History of Alabama ==
His History of Alabama and Incidentally of Georgia and Mississippi from the Earliest Period was published in 1851, with the copyright renewed in 1878 by Mrs. Sarah S. Pickett.

The book was republished in 1900 with an addition, "Annals of Alabama 1819-1900", by Thomas McAdory Owen. Another edition was published in 2003, with a foreword by Wayne Greenhaw and an introduction by Philip Beidler. In 2018, NewSouth books of Montgomery published The Annotated Pickett's History, annotated by historian James P. Pate.

== Bibliography ==
- History of Alabama and Incidentally of Georgia and Mississippi from the Earliest Period. Charleston, SC: Walker & James, 1851.
