= Selocta Chinnabby =

Muscogee/Natchez chief (died 1832)

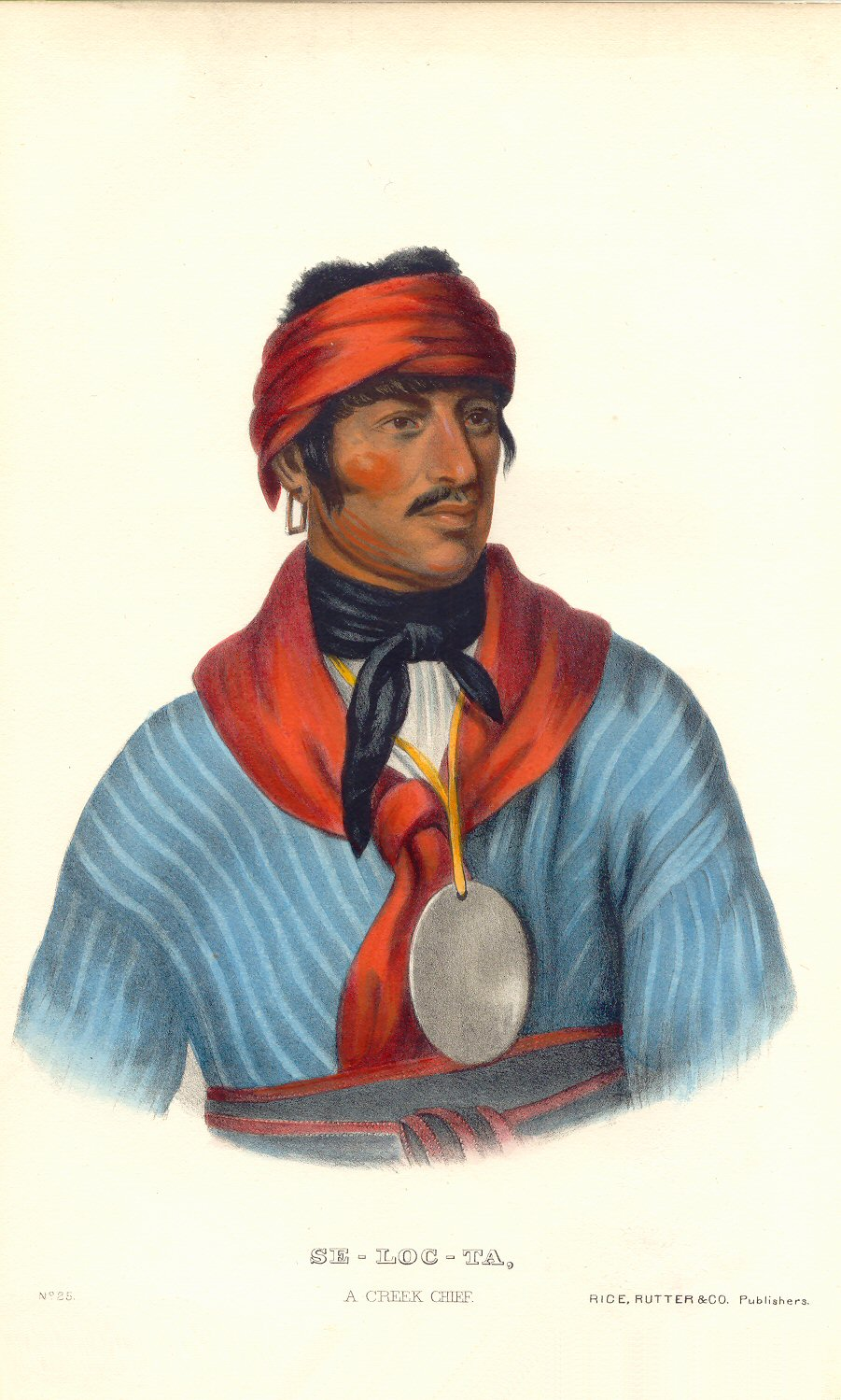
Copy of 19th century painting showing Selocta wearing a silver medal. "Se-Loc-Ta" based on painting by Charles Bird King, Hand-colored lithograph on paper (1836)

Selocta Chinnabby (c. 1765 – October 15, 1834 or February 10, 1835) was a Muscogee and Natchez chief from present-day Talladega County, Alabama. He allied himself with Andrew Jackson in fighting the Red Sticks in the Creek War, which was part of the larger War of 1812.

== Name ==
Selocta Chinnabby's name is also written as Shelocta, Se-loc-ta, Chinnabee, and Apuckshunubee.

== Family ==
Chinnabby was possibly born in 1765 near Choccolocco Creek and was the son of a Natchez chief, Moss Micco Chinnabby, and a Muscogee mother. After the Natchez revolt, a portion of the Natchez moved to central Alabama and settled in an abandoned village near the Coosa River on Tallaseehatchee Creek. This new village was known as Natchee, Natchez Town, or Notchietown.

Chinnabby's father accompanied Alexander McGillivray to New York City to participate in the signing of the 1790 Treaty of New York. Chinnabby had a brother whose name was Salarta/Salarto Fixico (General Coffee).

== Adult life ==
During the Creek War, Chinnabby sided with the United States in fighting the Red Sticks. In 1813, a defensive stockade named Fort Chinnabee was built three miles north of Chinnabby's village, which was on the north shore of Choccolocco Creek near the influx of Wolfskull Creek. (Note: Wolfskull Creek joins Choccolocco Creek six miles east of Oxford.) Chinnabby fought in a number of battles, including the Battle of Talladega, Battles of Emuckfaw and Enotachopo Creek, and Battle of Horseshoe Bend. Prior to the Battle of Talladega, it was reported that Chinnabby escaped Fort Leslie covered in the skin of a wild hog and was able to warn Jackson at Fort Strother that Fort Leslie was under siege by Red Stick warriors. Prior to the Battle of Emuckfaw Creek, Chinnabby led warriors allied with the United States in an attack on a Hillabee village. Chinnabby's brother was killed in this attack.

Chinnabby was present at the signing of the Treaty of Fort Jackson. He supported yielding Muscogee lands along the Alabama River in exchange for keeping land west of the Coosa River in Muscogee possession. Jackson did not agree with this arrangement, as he felt this allowed Great Britain a connection to supply inland Native Americans in their continued conflicts with the United States. However, Chinnabby later pleaded with Jackson that the ones who helped him should keep their land. He died just before the Trail of Tears.

Chinnabby also fought with Jackson in the First Seminole War.

Chinnabby also controlled bands of Cherokee, who called him Apuckshunubee.

Chinnabby signed the 1826 Treaty of Washington, along with Opothleyahola and Menawa. After signing the treaty, he was given a silver medal by President John Quincy Adams.

== Death and burial ==
An early source stated that Chinnabby died after a horse race. He was intoxicated and rode headfirst into a tree. Other sources indicate Chinnabby was traveling to Mardisville on October 15, 1834, to purchase supplies prior to his death. His death has also been recorded as occurring on February 10, 1835. He was buried with his silver medal near the community of Munford, and his cabin was ceremonially burned. Chinnabby's grave marker is located at Thomas McElderry's cemetery at these coordinates 33°29′11″N 85°57′43″W.

== Legacy ==
Chinnabee, Alabama in Talladega County is named for Chinnabby.

The Lake Chinnabee Recreation Area, located inside the Talladega National Forest, is named for Chinnabby. The recreation area includes the Chinnabee Silent Trail, which was constructed by a Boy Scout troop from the Alabama Institute for the Deaf and Blind. A waterfall along the trail is named Chinaabaee.
