= Hillabee Massacre =

1813 military engagement

Map showing engagement at Hillabee (U.S. Army Campaigns of the War of 1812, 2014)

The Hillabee Massacre is a military action of the Creek War in Mississippi Territory on November 13, 1813, in which troops under James White, commanded by John Cocke, attacked the Hillabee town of Muscogee-speaking Creeks. The Hillabee had been aligned with the Red Sticks but had surrendered to Andrew Jackson on November 13. Immediately after the Battle of Talladega, Robert Grierson, a Scotland-born trader who had married a Creek woman and had a multiracial family in the vicinity of Hillabee rode to Fort Strother to negotiate with Jackson. Meanwhile, Cocke had been avoiding meeting up with Jackson's troops, in part because they would draw down his own supplies. Therefore Cocke and White were apparently unaware of this surrender development.

With 1,000 Tennessee militiamen, including Samuel Bunch's mounted infantry, James Porter's cavalry, and Gideon Morgan's Regiment of Cherokee Warriors, White departed November 11, marched on Little Oakfuskie and Cenalgo, burning 120 houses, and then attacked the town of Hillabee.

The settlement of 300 was totally unprepared for combat on November 18, 68 people were killed, and 250 captured. Morgan's Cherokee "inflicted most of the casualties," except for one Creek who was killed by a white man. There were no American casualties.

The surviving Hillabees realigned with the Red Sticks. Cocke later claimed the surrender was a hoax perpetrated by Jackson because he was jealous of another commander's success. In the words of military historian Tom Kanon, "To be sure, Jackson was probably more upset with Cocke for disobeying his orders than for chastising the Hillabees." Bunch's infantry passed through Cherokee land on the way to Fort Armstrong, and "There was much protest by the Cherokees concerning property destroyed by the Tennessee troops as they were marching home. The Cherokees claimed that their livestock was 'wantonly destroyed for sport' by the Tennessee soldiers."

This incident has traditionally been downplayed compared to the Fort Mims massacre, for instance at the Horseshoe Bend battlefield museum: "The only massacre that mattered was the one in which whites were killed."
