= Fort Leslie =

American historical site in Alabama

- Talladega, Alabama in United States
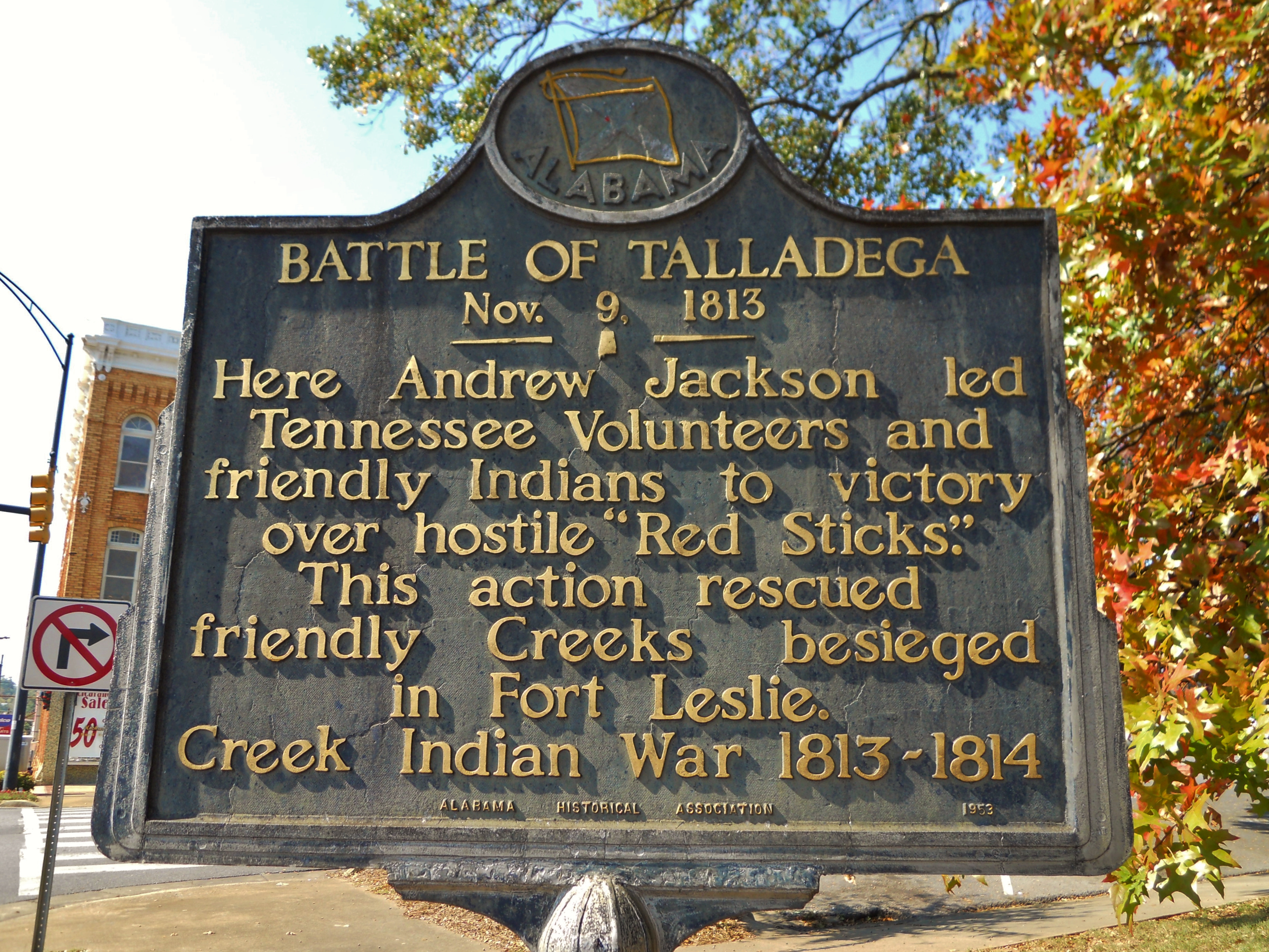
- Historical marker describing the Battle of Talladega

Site information
- Type: Stockade fort
- Owner: Private
- Controlled by: Private
- Open to the public: No
- Condition: Site on private land

Location
- Location within Alabama Location within the United States
- Coordinates: 33°25′18″N 86°06′43″W

Site history
- Built: 1813
- Built by: Alexander Leslie and allied Creeks
- In use: 1813-1814
- Battles/wars: Battle of Talladega, Creek War

Fort Leslie (also known as Fort Lashley or Fort Talladega) was a stockade fort built in present-day Talladega, Alabama, in 1813 during the Creek War. After the Creek War began, protective stockades were built by settlers and Creeks who were allied with the United States to protect themselves from hostile Creek attacks. Fort Leslie was the focal point of the Battle of Talladega but was soon abandoned after the end of the Creek War.

== History ==
=== Background ===
Once the War of 1812 began, the United States was concerned that the Creek Indians might ally with Great Britain. In 1813, after a rebel Creek faction known as Red Sticks began attacking settlers, the United States began a military campaign against them. By then, many American settlers on Creek land had built stockades to protect themselves from Red Stick warriors.

Part of the campaign against the Red Sticks involved Tennessee militia, led by Andrew Jackson, traveling south from Tennessee to attack various Red Stick villages. While the militia was building Fort Strother, a force under the command of General John Coffee fought the Battle of Tallushatchee on November 3, 1813. Coffee's force then returned to Fort Strother to aid in the final parts of the fort's construction. After the construction of Fort Strother was completed, news reached Fort Strother that Fort Leslie was under siege by Red Stick warriors and its occupants were requesting assistance from Jackson.

=== Construction ===
Prior to Fort Leslie's construction, a métis named Alexander Leslie (also spelled Lashley) operated a trading post on the site, as he was the principal trader to the Creek town of Talladega. Leslie's father, also named Alexander Leslie, was born in Scotland and moved to Barbados prior to moving to the United States. The elder Leslie served as a writer for the famed Creek leader Alexander McGillivray. After hostilities with the Red Sticks began, a protective stockade was constructed around Leslie's trading post and was named for him.

Construction on the protective stockade began in the fall of 1813. Friendly Creeks from Chinnabee's town and Talladega assisted in the fort's construction. The fort was likely square or rectangular and consisted of upright, quartered cedar logs. A contemporary map drawn after the Battle of Talladega (included on the right side of the article) depicts Fort Leslie's stockade as being formed in a circle. A platform was built around the inside of the palisade so the fort's occupants could fire over the walls. The fort's occupants obtained water from a nearby spring known as Big Springs.

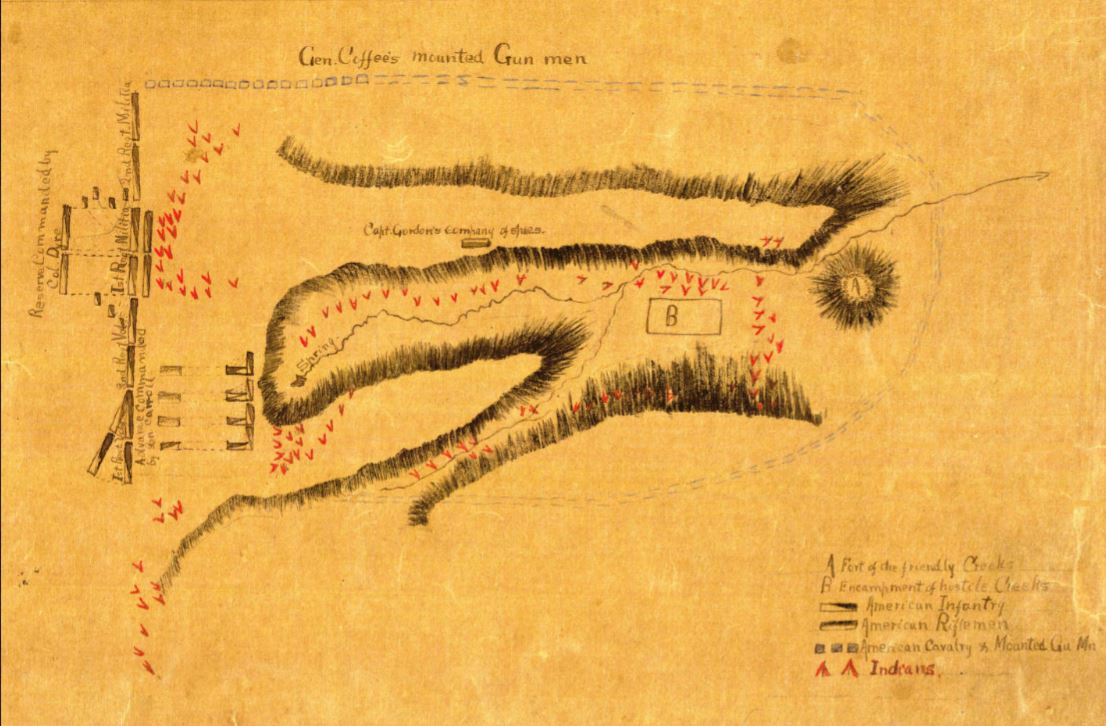
Hand-drawn sketch of the Battle of Talladega. Fort Leslie is labeled as "A" on map.

=== Military use ===
After the Creek War began, American settlers and allied Creeks gathered inside and around Fort Leslie for protection from any Red Stick aggression. Many of the allied Creeks were from the nearby town of Talladega. Numbers differ on how many occupants were inside the fort, with some sources stating there were only 160 people total and other sources stating anywhere from 154 to 180 allied Creek warriors and their families. These numbers do not include the number of any Americans who may have occupied Fort Leslie.

Between November 3 and November 7, Red Stick warriors surrounded Fort Leslie and demanded that the Creek warriors inside should join forces with the Red Sticks or they would be killed and their provisions taken. The siege caused the fort's inhabitants to quickly use up their supplies, and they soon only had a small amount of corn and minimal drinking water. Between November 7 and November 9, an occupant of Fort Leslie was able to escape and notify Jackson at Fort Strother of the Red Stick siege. Multiple sources identify the courier as James Fife, who was a member of the Natchez tribe and later served as a captain in Jackson's army. Other sources identify the messenger as Selocta Chinnabby (also known as Sarlotta Chinnabby or Young Chinnabee), who was the son of the local Creek chief Chinnabee. An additional source cited three Creek warriors bringing word of the attack to Jackson. According to early traditions, the courier avoided detection of the surrounding Red Stick warriors by escaping under the cover of darkness while covered in the skin of a wild hog. According to Thomas Simpson Woodward, who wrote an early history of the Creeks, the hog skin story was a hoax and never occurred.

News of the Red Stick attack at Fort Leslie reached Jackson at Fort Strother some time between November 7 and November 9. Jackson set out from Fort Strother on November 9, intending to rescue the occupants of Fort Leslie. Jackson's force was smaller than he planned due to the General James White not sending any troops to reinforce Fort Strother while Jackson would be at Fort Leslie. Jackson's force arrived at Fort Leslie later in the day on November 9 and fought the Battle of Talladega. Davy Crockett, who participated in the battle, said Fort Leslie was surrounded by 1100 Red Sticks. Even though the main battle did not involve Fort Leslie, some of the American soldiers took refuge inside the fort. Between 300 and 600 allied Creeks and 18 Americans were killed during the battle.

After the Battle of Horseshoe Bend, Jackson ordered captured Red Sticks to be sent to Fort Leslie prior to transport to Huntsville.

=== Postwar ===
In 1958, hearings were held by the United States House Committee on Interior and Insular Affairs that proposed making the sites of Fort Strother, Fort Williams, Fort Jackson, and Fort Leslie national monuments. After the hearings, no further action was taken.

The site of Fort Leslie was identified in 1986 using an 1832 survey map made by a Samuel Craig. The map was obtained from the National Archives and Records Administration with the assistance of Bill Nichols.

=== Present ===
The original site of Fort Leslie is unmarked and on private land. Even though the site has been confirmed, most archaeological remains no longer exist at the fort site. In 2024, The Archaeological Conservancy purchased land that contained a portion of the site of Fort Leslie and the former Talladega Blast Furnace.

Fort Lashley Avenue in Talladega is named for Fort Leslie and travels by the site of Fort Leslie.

== Sources ==
- Abram, Susan M. (2015). Forging a Cherokee-American Alliance in the Creek War: From Creation to Betrayal. Tuscaloosa, Alabama: University of Alabama Press. ISBN 978-0-8173-1875-8.
- Federal Highway Administration (May 1978). Administrative Action Draft Environmental Impact Statement for Project F-14(7), Western Bypass of the City of Talladega, Talladega County, Alabama (Report). Washington, D.C.: United States Department of Transportation.
- Foscue, Virginia (1989). Place Names in Alabama. Tuscaloosa, Alabama: The University of Alabama Press. ISBN 0-8173-0410-X.
- Groneman, William III (2005). David Crockett: Hero of the Common Man. New York, New York: Tom Doherty Associates, LLC. ISBN 0-765-31067-8.
- Hannings, Bud (2012). The War of 1812: A Complete Chronology with Biographies of 63 General Officers. Jefferson, North Carolina: McFarland & Company. ISBN 0-8173-1125-4.
- Harris, W. Stuart (1977). Dead Towns of Alabama. Tuscaloosa, Alabama: University of Alabama Press. ISBN 0-8173-1125-4.
- Jackson, Andrew (1926) [Composed November 15, 1813]. Bassett, John Spencer (ed.). Correspondence of Andrew Jackson. Vol. 1. Washington, D.C.: Carnegie Institution of Washington.
- Missall, John; Missall, Mary Lou (2020). The Seminole Struggle: A History of America's Longest Indian War. Lanham, Maryland: Rowman & Littlefield Publishing Group, Inc. ISBN 978-1-68334-059-1.
- Nickles, Otis (1888). "Chapter IX: Talladega". Northern Alabama: Historical and Biographical. Smith & DeLand. p. 447.
- Sheldon, Craig T. Jr. (2012). "Chapter 11: Archaeology, Geography, and the Creek War in Alabama". In Braund, Kathryn E. Holland (ed.). Tohopeka: Rethinking the Creek War & the War of 1812. Tuscaloosa, Alabama: University of Alabama Press. ISBN 978-0-7864-6385-5.
- United States Congress (1900). Congressional Record: Proceedings and Debates of the Fifty-Sixth Congress, First Session. Washington, D.C.: United States Congress.
- United States Congress (1958). Accomplishments of the Committee on Interior and Insular Affairs of the House of Representatives During the Eighty-Fifth Congress. Washington, D.C.: United States Congress.
- Walls, Peggy Jackson (2021). Lost Towns of Central Alabama. Charleston, South Carolina: The History Press. ISBN 978-1-43967-305-8.
- Weir, Howard (2016). A Paradise of Blood: The Creek War of 1813–14. Yardley, Pennsylvania: Westholme. ISBN 1-59416-270-0.
- Woodward, Thomas (1859). Woodward's Reminiscences of the Creek, or Muscogee Indians, Contained in Letters to Friends in Georgia and Alabama. Montgomery, Alabama: Barrett and Wimbish.
- Wright, Amos J. Jr. (2003). Historic Indian Towns in Alabama, 1540-1838. Tuscaloosa, Alabama: University of Alabama Press. ISBN 0-8173-1251-X.
- 56th Congress, First Session (1900). Revolutionary Monument at Talladega, Alabama. Washington, D. C.: United States Senate.
