= Fort Armstrong (Alabama) =

United States historic site

- Cedar Bluff, Alabama in United States
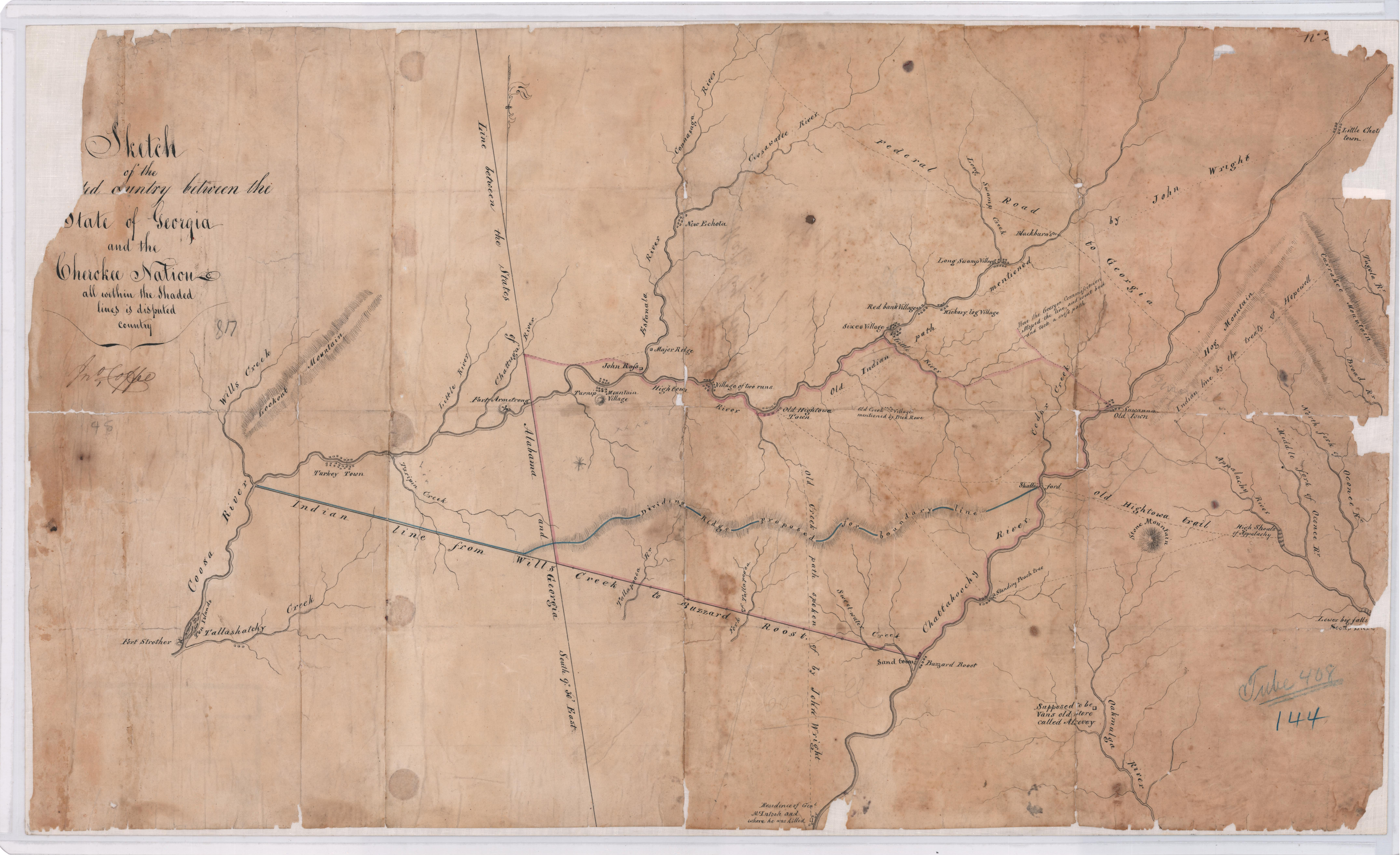
- 1820 map by John Coffee showing Fort Armstrong (located in center) in relation to Fort Strother and other Cherokee towns

Site information
- Type: Stockade fort
- Owner: Private
- Controlled by: Private
- Open to the public: no
- Condition: Inundated by Weiss Lake

Location
- Location within Alabama Location within the United States
- Coordinates: 34°12′00″N 85°35′29″W

Site history
- Built: October 1813
- Built by: Tennessee militia
- In use: 1813-1814
- Battles/wars: Creek War

Fort Armstrong was a stockade fort built in present-day Cherokee County, Alabama during the Creek War. The fort was built to protect the surrounding area from attacks by Red Stick warriors but was also used as a staging area and supply depot in preparation for further military action against the Red Sticks.

== Background ==
During the War of 1812, members of the Creek tribe became involved in a civil war.

The Creek War began when the United States, fearful that the Red Sticks might ally with Great Britain, began taking military action against the Red Sticks in response to attacks on settlers in Creek land. After the Battle of Burnt Corn and the Fort Mims massacre, the United States army and militias built forts in the Mississippi Territory to supply military campaigns against the Creek Nation.

== History ==
=== Creek War ===
Fort Armstrong was built in October 1813 by soldiers under the command of General James White, who was serving under General John Alexander Cocke. The fort was named for John Armstrong Jr., who was the Secretary of War at that time. The fort was built to help protect the local Cherokee from incursions by Red Sticks but also in anticipation of a future assault on the Red Sticks. Boats were assembled at Fort Armstrong to transport supplies further down the Coosa River. Fort Armstrong was in turn supplied by wagons from Fort Ross. After the construction of Fort Strother, Jackson ordered General Cocke to collect all available corn in the Cherokee lands and areas surrounding the Coosa River. Lack of sufficient troops prevented these supplies from being sent to Fort Strother. These delays annoyed Jackson, and in letters to Willie Blount and General Cocke he complained about the absence of breadstuffs and cattle in arriving to Fort Strother.

Prior to the Battle of Talladega, General Andrew Jackson ordered General White and his troops to proceed to and guard Fort Strother. White set out with approximately 1,000 soldiers, including mounted infantry under the command of Colonel Samuel Bunch, a cavalry unit, and Cherokee soldiers (including Sequoyah). General Cocke simultaneously ordered White to return to Fort Armstrong due to the known lack of supplies at Fort Strother. En route to Fort Armstrong, White attacked the Hillabee and destroyed their towns without knowing they had declared peace with Jackson.

Cherokee soldiers who were part of Jackson's forces were stationed at Fort Armstrong. The Cherokee soldiers were allowed to participate in individual raids against the Red Sticks. After the Battle of Talladega and the Hillabee Massacre, many Cherokee continued to be stationed at Fort Armstrong even though they were furloughed by Jackson. In January and February 1814, they were part of the 2nd Regiment East Tennessee Volunteer Militia and helped guard supply and communication lines. Some of the soldiers also guarded Pathkiller and his residence in Turkeytown. The Cherokee who remained at Fort Armstrong built a council house and square ground. Colonel Gideon Morgan oversaw the Cherokee soldiers from Fort Armstrong and was in constant communication with their Indian agent, Return J. Meigs Sr.

On March 2, 1814, Colonel Morgan gave orders to his adjutant, John Ross, to rendezvous at Fort Armstrong with the remaining Cherokee forces and march to Fort Strother. Colonel John Williams and the 39th Infantry Regiment simultaneously transferred supplies from Fort Armstrong to Fort Williams to aide Jackson's forces in anticipation of the Battle of Horseshoe Bend.

=== Postwar ===
After Fort Armstrong no longer had a military use, the fort was abandoned and a ferry operated at the site.

John Ross and his brother Andrew operated a store at the site of Fort Armstrong after the Creek War.

=== Present ===
The original fort site is unknown. The Jacksonville State University Archaeological Resource Laboratory has performed archaeological investigations on Pruett's Island, which is thought to be the approximate location of Fort Armstrong. It is possible the site was inundated by the formation of Weiss Lake.

== Units ==
The 1st and 2nd Regiment of East Tennessee Militia, the 1st and 2nd Regiment Tennessee Volunteer Infantry, the 1st Regiment Volunteer Mounted Infantry, and a detachment of the 8th Brigade of Tennessee Militia were all stationed at Fort Armstrong at some point.

== Location ==
Thomas M. Owen reported Fort Armstrong was located on the Etowah River, while Albert J. Pickett stated it was built on Coosahatchie Creek. Most evidence points to it being located on the north bank of the Coosa River near Turkeytown and present-day Cedar Bluff.

== Sources ==
- Braund, Kathryn E. Holland (2012). Tohopeka: Rethinking the Creek War & the War of 1812. Tuscaloosa, Alabama: University of Alabama Press. ISBN 978-0-8173-5711-5.
- Harris, W. Stuart (1977). Dead Towns of Alabama. Tuscaloosa, Alabama: University of Alabama Press. ISBN 0-8173-1125-4.
- Jackson, Andrew (1926) [Composed December 1813]. Bassett, John Spencer (ed.). Correspondence of Andrew Jackson. Vol. 1. Washington, D.C.: Carnegie Institution of Washington.
- Lossing, Benson John (April 1864). "Scenes in the War of 1812". Harper's Magazine. Vol. XXVIII. New York City, New York: Harper & Brother's. ISBN 9781248325346.
- Marshall, Lamar; Smith, Larry; Wren, Michael (March 2009). Alabama Collection Camps, Forts, Emigrating Depots and Travel Routes Used During the Cherokee Removal of 1838-1839 (PDF) (Report). Muscle Shoals, Alabama: Southeastern Anthropological Institute. "Funded by The National Park Service Challenge Cost Share Program."
- Moulton, Gary E. (1978). John Ross, Cherokee Chief. Athens, Georgia: University of Georgia Press. ISBN 978-0-8203-2367-1.
- Pickett, Albert James (1878). History of Alabama, and Incidentally of Georgia and Mississippi, from the Earliest Period. Tuscaloosa, Alabama: Willo Publishing Company. ISBN 978-1363310845.
