= Turkeytown (Cherokee town) =

Former Cherokee settlement in frontier Alabama

Coordinates: 34.079°N 85.875°W

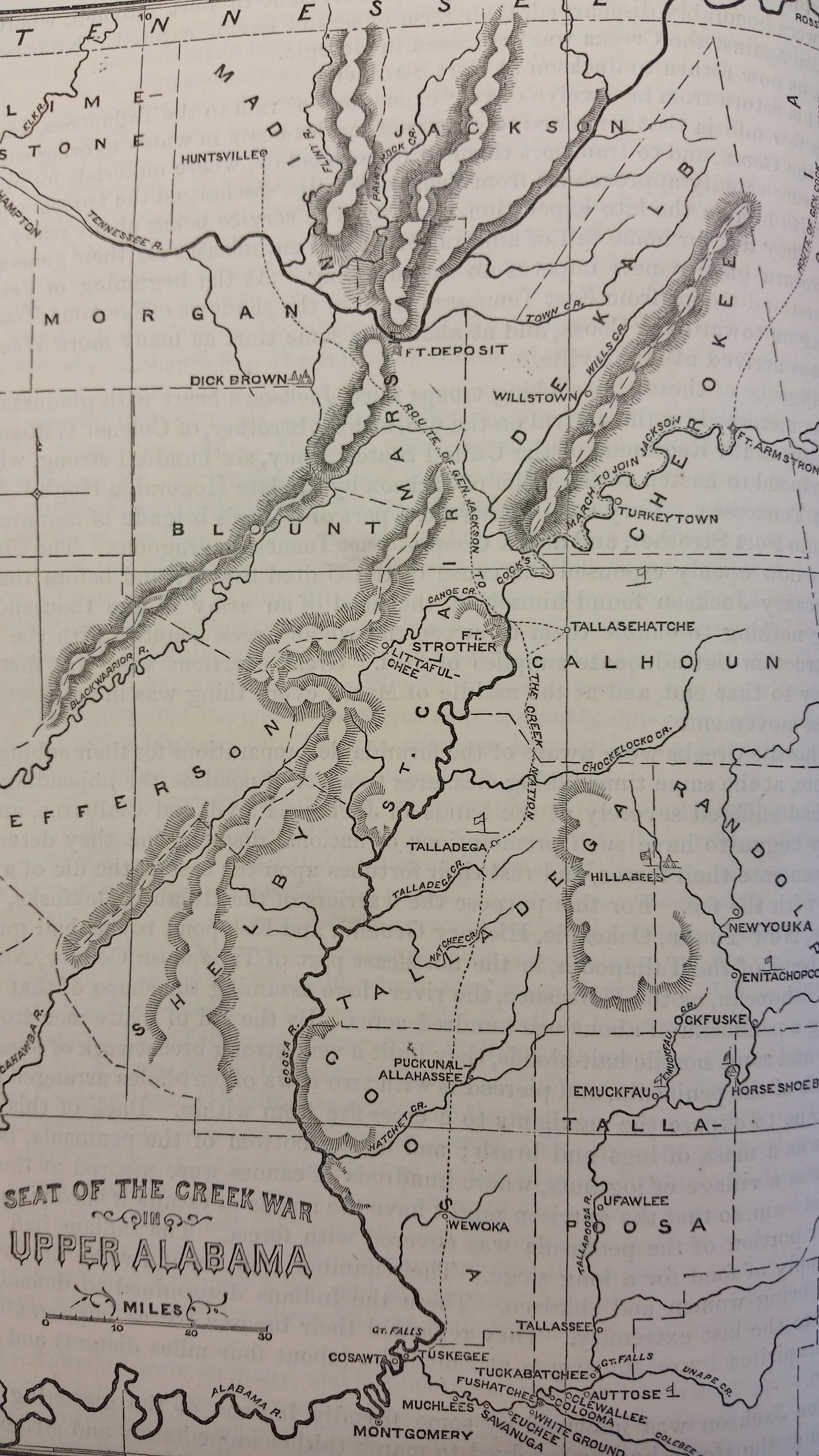
Map of Alabama during the War of 1812. Fort Armstrong and Turkeytown are located in the upper right.

Turkeytown (Cherokee: "Gun'-di'ga-duhun'yi"), sometimes called "Turkey's Town", was a small Cherokee village that once stretched for approximately 25 miles along both banks of the Coosa River, and became the largest of the contemporary Cherokee towns. It was named after the original founder of the settlement, the Chickamauga Cherokee chief, Little Turkey.

Turkeytown was the original site of the United States military outpost of Fort Armstrong established in October 1813 during the War of 1812 as an ongoing protection for the area. It was originally garrisoned entirely by Cherokee soldiers.

== History ==
Turkeytown was settled in 1788. The town was established by Little Turkey during the Cherokee–American wars as a refuge for him and his people from the hostilities along the frontier.

On October 3, 1790, John Ross, who became Principal Chief of the Cherokee Nation from 1828–1866, was born here, to parents Daniel Ross, an immigrant Scots trader and his Cherokee wife, Mollie McDonald.

The town was facing attack by the Red Stick Indians (a hostile faction of the Creek) during the Creek War in October 1813. Turkeytown chief, and Principal Chief of the Cherokee, Pathkiller, asked Andrew Jackson for help. Jackson responded by dispatching a detachment, led by General James White and including many Cherokee soldiers, to relieve the town.

=== Current day ===
Much of the original site of Turkeytown is now underwater, due to the impoundment of the Coosa River which formed Weiss Lake.

The present-day community of Turkey Town in Etowah County, Alabama is fewer than ten miles southwest of Centre, Alabama and near the original site of the town.

== See also ==
- The Battle of Horseshoe Bend
- Treaty of Turkeytown
