= Talladega Springs, Alabama =

- Town
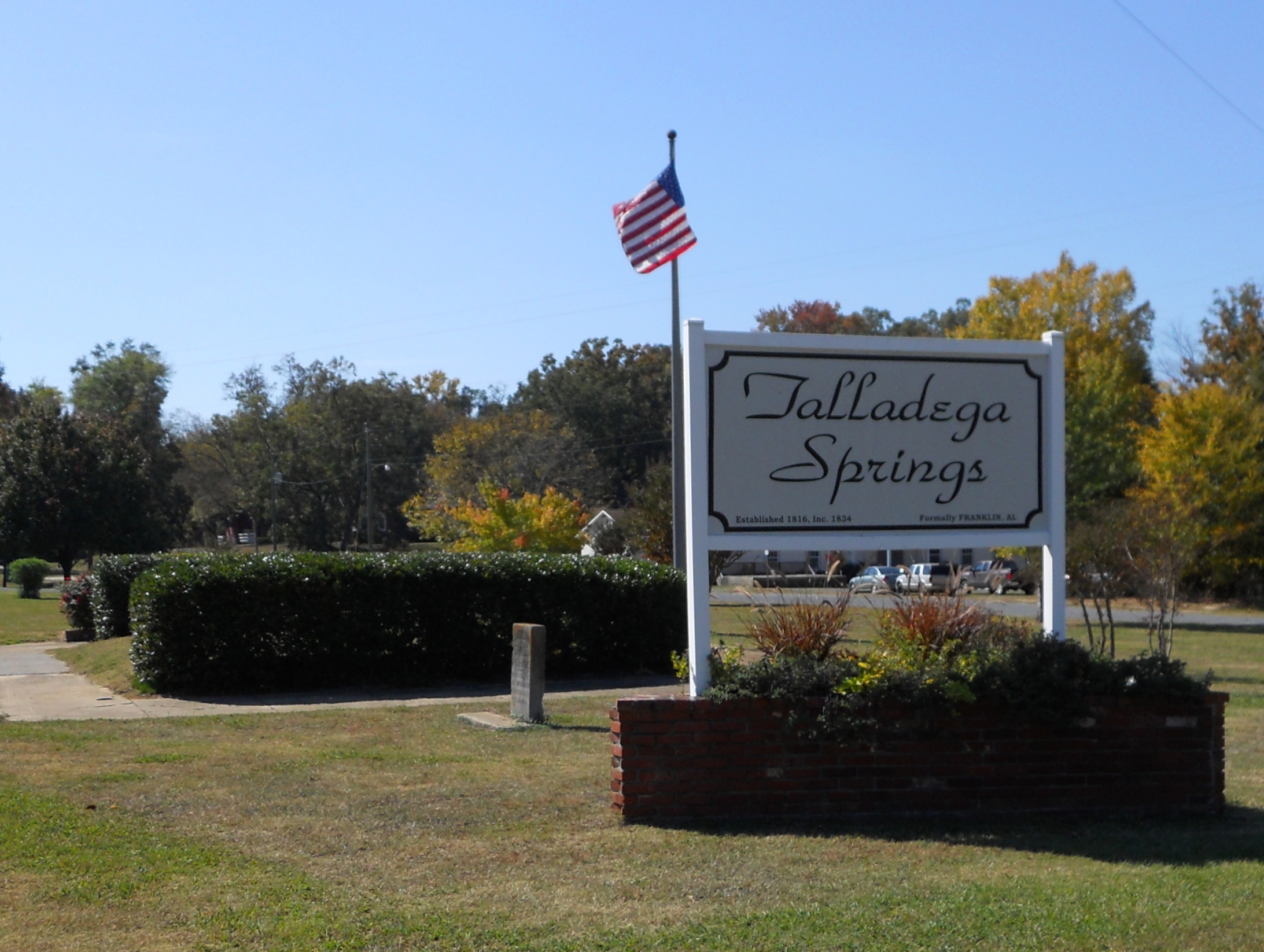
- Talladega Springs sign

- Location of Talladega Springs in Talladega County, Alabama.
- Coordinates: 33°07′20″N 86°26′31″W
- Country: United States
- State: Alabama
- County: Talladega

Area
  - Total: 1.24 sq mi (3.22 km^{2})
  - Land: 1.23 sq mi (3.19 km^{2})
  - Water: 0.012 sq mi (0.03 km^{2})
- Elevation: 436 ft (133 m)

Population (2020)
  - Total: 144
  - Density: 117.0/sq mi (45.18/km^{2})
- Time zone: UTC-6 (Central (CST))
  - Summer (DST): UTC-5 (CDT)
- FIPS code: 01-74616
- GNIS feature ID: 2406710

Talladega Springs is a town in southwest Talladega County, Alabama, United States. At the 2020 census, the population was 144.

== History ==
Also known as Sulphur Springs the town became known as Talladega Springs in 1845 and was incorporated as such in 1913. The town was a resort where people came to drink the water which was rich in sulfur and believed to have medicinal properties. At one time the town had a hotel with a swimming pool, a bank, pharmacy, post office, town jail with two cells, a grist mill, a sawmill, and a Coca-Cola bottling plant. Trains brought travelers to the town several times daily. Tourism dwindled in the early 1900s and the town with it. Today there is little evidence of what Talladega Springs used to be. The foundations of the old hotel, a badly cracked cement pool, the walls of the hotel smokehouse, and the old jail are about all that remains.

Before being submerged beneath Lay Lake, Fort Williams was located near Talladega Springs. It was used as an Indian Agency and supply depot during the Creek War.

== Geography ==
According to the U.S. Census Bureau, the town has a total area of 1.2 square miles (3.2 km^{2}), of which 0.012 square miles (0.03 km^{2}), or 0.90%, is water.

== Demographics ==
Historical population
| Census | Pop. | Note | %± |
|---|---|---|---|
| 1920 | 257 | | — |
| 1930 | 118 | | −54.1% |
| 1940 | 150 | | 27.1% |
| 1950 | 222 | | 48.0% |
| 1960 | 177 | | −20.3% |
| 1970 | 143 | | −19.2% |
| 1980 | 196 | | 37.1% |
| 1990 | 148 | | −24.5% |
| 2000 | 124 | | −16.2% |
| 2010 | 166 | | 33.9% |
| 2020 | 144 | | −13.3% |
U.S. Decennial Census; 2013 Estimate

As of the census of 2000, there were 124 people, 57 households, and 38 families residing in the town. The population density was 99.7 inhabitants per square mile (38.5/km^{2}). There were 65 housing units at an average density of 52.3 per square mile (20.2/km^{2}). The racial makeup of the town was 91.13% White, 6.45% Black or African American, 0.81% Native American, and 1.61% from two or more races. 1.61% of the population were Hispanic or Latino of any race.

There were 57 households, out of which 26.3% had children under the age of 18 living with them, 61.4% were married couples living together, 3.5% had a female householder with no husband present, and 33.3% were non-families. 33.3% of all households were made up of individuals, and 14.0% had someone living alone who was 65 years of age or older. The average household size was 2.18 and the average family size was 2.76.

In the town, the population was spread out, with 21.0% under the age of 18, 7.3% from 18 to 24, 30.6% from 25 to 44, 21.0% from 45 to 64, and 20.2% who were 65 years of age or older. The median age was 39 years. For every 100 females, there were 85.1 males. For every 100 females age 18 and over, there were 88.5 males.

The median income for a household in the town was $35,833, and the median income for a family was $41,250. Males had a median income of $36,042 versus $14,167 for females. The per capita income for the town was $29,556. There were 11.1% of families and 17.2% of the population living below the poverty line, including 38.5% of under eighteens and 29.6% of those over 64.
