= Fort Strother =

United States historic site

- Fort Strother Site
- U.S. National Register of Historic Places
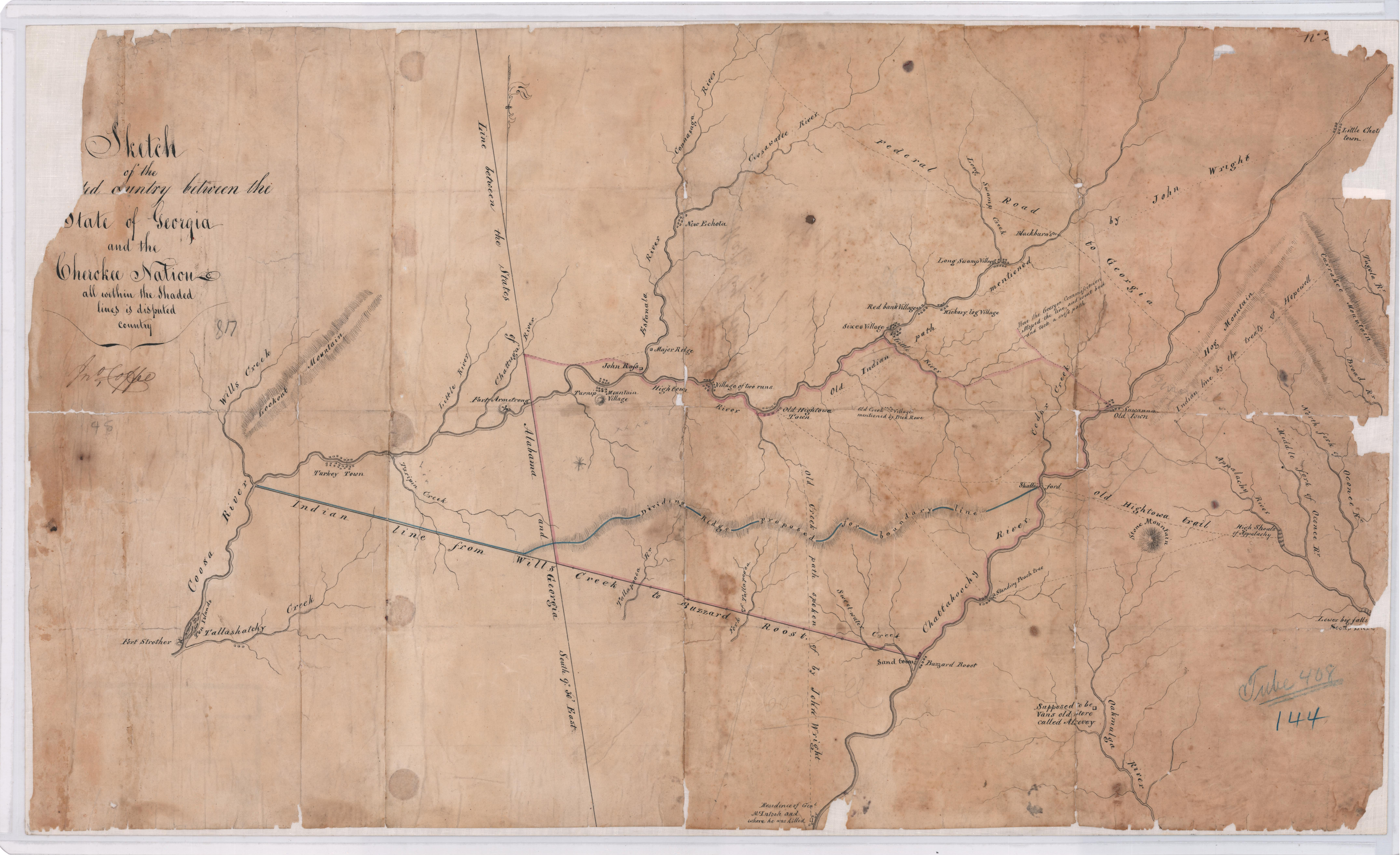
- 1820 map by John Coffee showing Fort Strother (located in bottom left corner) in relation to Fort Armstrong and other Cherokee towns

- Location within Alabama Location within the United States
- Nearest city: Ragland, Alabama
- Coordinates: 33°45′49″N 86°02′51″W
- Area: 334 acres (135 ha)
- Built: 1813
- NRHP reference No.: 72001440
- Added to NRHP: July 24, 1972

Fort Strother was a stockade fort at Ten Islands in the Mississippi Territory, in what is today St. Clair County, Alabama. It was located on a bluff of the Coosa River, near the modern Neely Henry Dam in Ragland, Alabama. The fort was built by General Andrew Jackson and several thousand militiamen in November 1813, during the Creek War and was named for Captain John Strother, Jackson's chief cartographer.

== History ==
=== Creek War ===
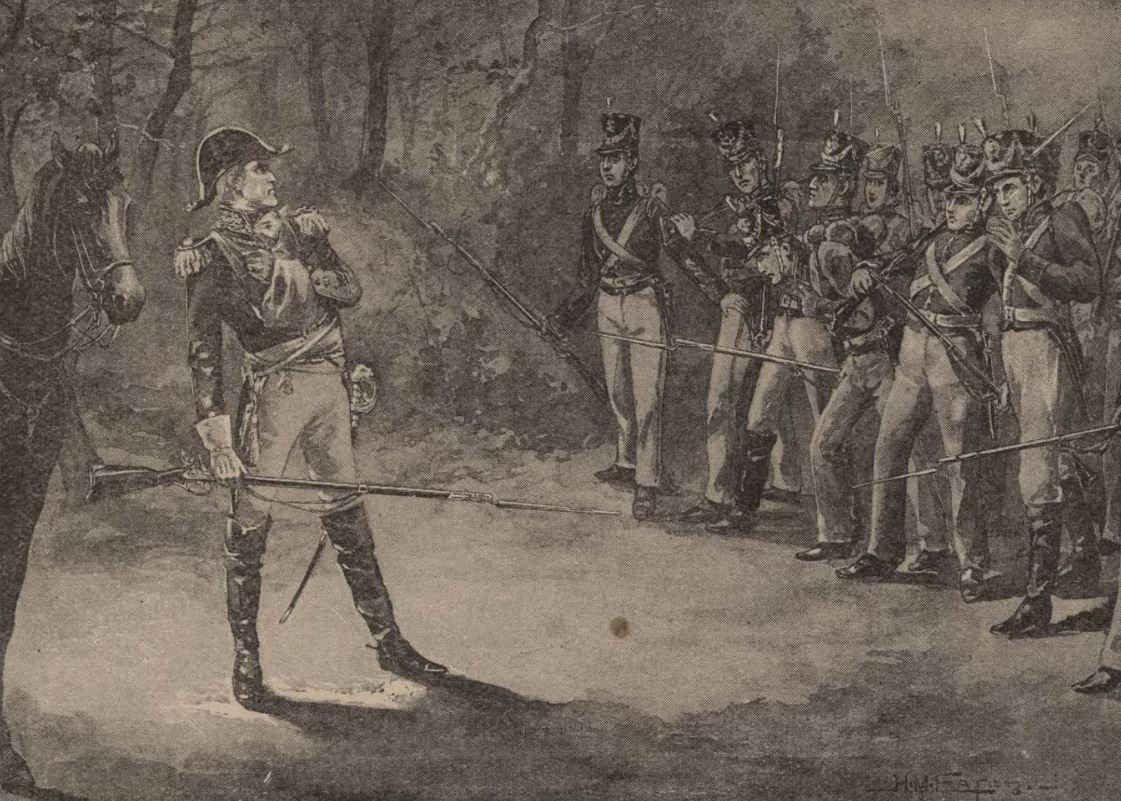
General Andrew Jackson quelling a mutiny of Tennessee soldiers outside Fort Strother

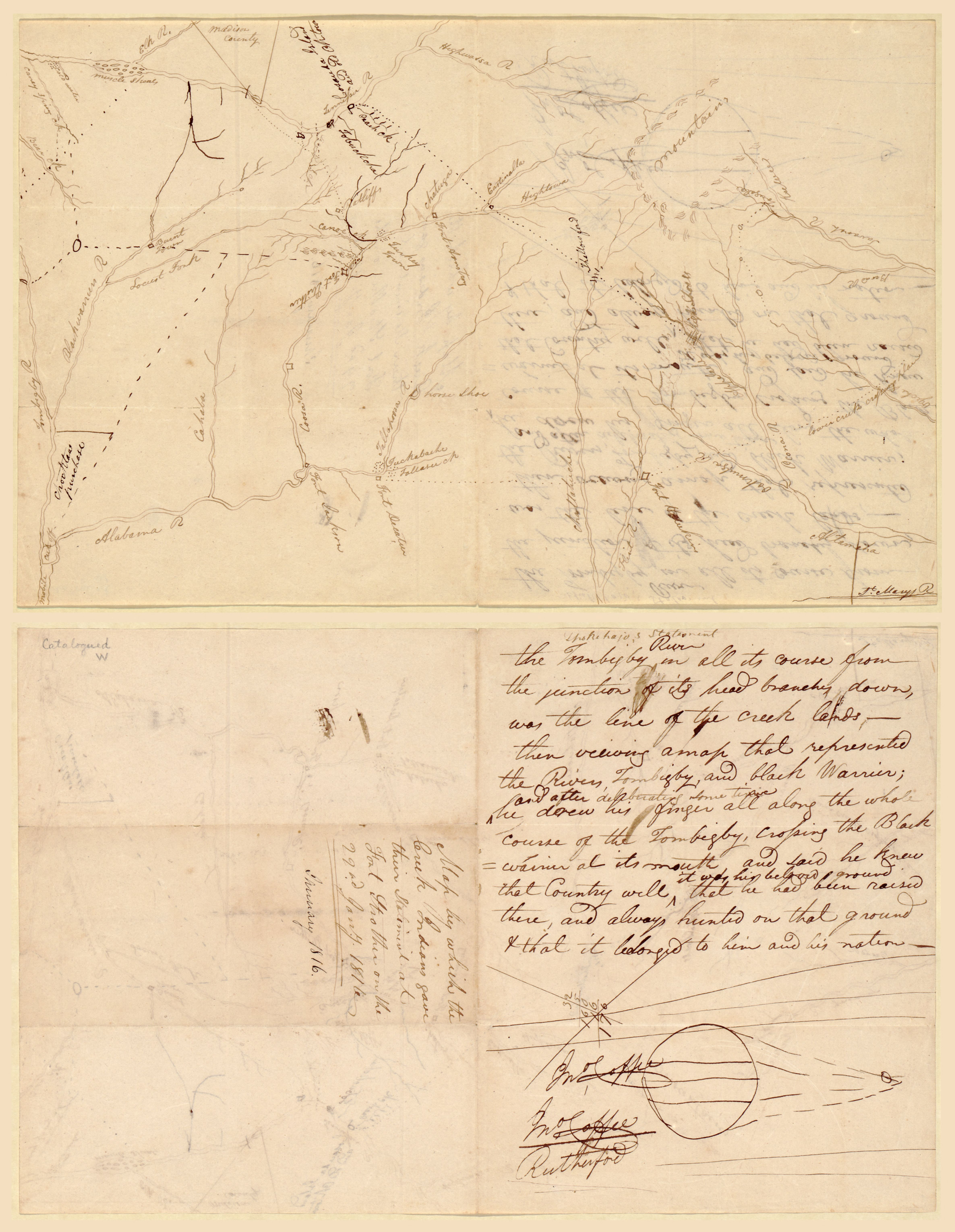
"Map by which the Creek Indians gave their statement at Fort Strother on the 22nd Jany, 1816"

On November 1, 1813, General Jackson reached the area of Ten Islands and began construction of Fort Strother. The fort was rectangular in shape and had blockhouses at each corner. It also included a supply building, eight hospital huts, and twenty-five tents. While constructing the fort, Jackson received news of a large number of Red Sticks that were in the village of Tallasseehatchee. He instructed General John Coffee to attack the village, resulting in the Battle of Tallushatchee. After the Battle of Tallushatchee, Red Stick warriors under the command of William Weatherford surrounded Fort Leslie and demanded that the inhabitants join in fighting against the United States. One of the occupants escaped and was able to reach Fort Strother and inform Jackson of the siege. Jackson ordered James White and his soldiers to guard Fort Strother while he proceeded to Fort Leslie. Instead, General John Alexander Cocke ordered White to proceed to the Hillabee towns and destroy them. Nevertheless, Jackson marched to Fort Leslie and fought the Battle of Talladega.

Jackson struggled with keeping Fort Strother supplied through the winter of 1813, despite it being connected to Fort Deposit on the Tennessee River by a 55-mile long supply road. Some of the Tennessee soldiers stationed at Fort Strother became disgruntled and felt their obligation to serve had been fulfilled. These soldiers deserted their posts, but were recaptured or chose to voluntarily return, Even so, six were executed. Supplies began to arrive from Fort Deposit and Fort Armstrong, along with additional reinforcements. With these new volunteers, Jackson set out to fight the Red Sticks at the large encampment at Tohopeka, but was instead attacked en route at the Battles of Emuckfaw and Enotachopo Creek. Returning to Fort Strother, Jackson continued to enlarge his forces with additional soldiers and supplies. Among the reinforcements were William McIntosh and seventy-five Coweta warriors, who came to Fort Strother after the Battle of Calebee Creek. In March 1814, Jackson dispatched Colonel John Williams and the 39th Infantry Regiment to establish Fort Williams further down the Coosa River. Jackson then marched to Fort Williams, and from there, his forces marched to Tohopeka and fought the Battle of Horseshoe Bend on March 27, 1814.

=== Present ===
An inscribed stone marker near Highway 144, erected by the county, records a brief history of the fort. The Daughters of the American Revolution also placed a commemorative marker at the site on the one-hundredth anniversary of the fort's founding.

== Preservation ==
The fort site was listed on the National Register of Historic Places in 1972. St. Clair County acquired the property in 2012. The exact location of the fort has not been identified, but the site of a cemetery and camp have been confirmed by archaeological investigations. Approximately 76 unmarked soldiers' graves have been identified laid out in three rows in the cemetery. Local efforts have been made to have the fort site and graves federally protected.

== Units ==
Members of the 1st and 2nd Regiment East Tennessee Volunteer Militia were stationed at Fort Strother, some under the command of Samuel Wear. Members of the Cherokee tribe were also stationed at Fort Strother. Davy Crockett spent time at Fort Strother during his service in the Creek War. Sam Houston was also stationed at Fort Strother while a member of the 39th Infantry Regiment.

== Sources ==
- Blackmon, Richard (2014). The Creek War 1813-1814 (PDF). Washington, D.C.: United States Army Center of Military History. ISBN 9780160925429. Archived from the original (PDF) on September 6, 2015. "CMH Pub 74-4"
- Braund, Kathryn E. Holland (2012). Tohopeka: Rethinking the Creek War & the War of 1812. Tuscaloosa, Alabama: University of Alabama Press. ISBN 978-0-8173-5711-5.
- Harris, W. Stuart (1977). Dead Towns of Alabama. Tuscaloosa, Alabama: University of Alabama Press. ISBN 0-8173-1125-4.
- Jones, Randell (2006). In the Footsteps of Davy Crockett. Winston-Salem, North Carolina: John F. Blair. ISBN 978-0-89587-324-8.
- Weir, Howard (2016). A Paradise of Blood: The Creek War of 1813-14. Yardley, Pennsylvania: Westholme. ISBN 1-59416-270-0.
