= John Alexander Cocke =

American politician

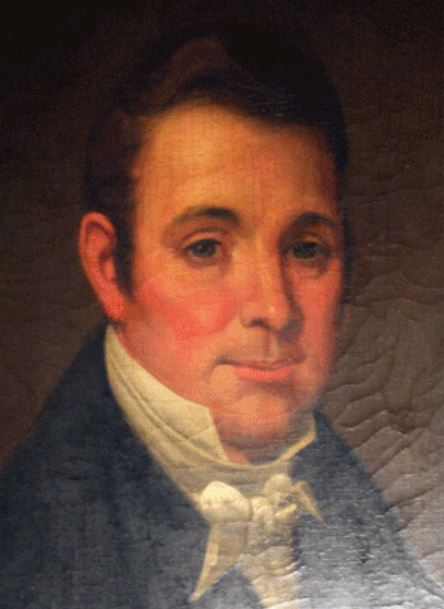

Member of the U.S. House of Representatives from Tennessee's 2nd district
- In office March 4, 1819 – March 3, 1827
- Preceded by: William Grainger Blount
- Succeeded by: Pryor Lea

Speaker of the Tennessee House of Representatives
- In office 1811–1813
- Preceded by: Joseph Dickson
- Succeeded by: Thomas Claiborne
- In office 1837–1839
- Preceded by: Ephraim H. Foster
- Succeeded by: Jonas E. Thomas

Personal details
- Born: December 28, 1772 Nottoway County, Virginia Colony, British America
- Died: February 16, 1854 (aged 81) Rutledge, Tennessee, U.S.
- Resting place: Rutledge Methodist Church Cemetery, Rutledge, Tennessee
- Party: Democratic-Republican; Jacksonian
- Spouse: Sarah Stratton Cocke
- Relations: William Cocke (father); William M. Cocke (nephew)
- Profession: Attorney

Military service
- Branch/service: Tennessee militia
- Years of service: 1813–1814
- Rank: Major general
- Commands: 1st Division (Eastern)
- Battles/wars: Creek War

John Alexander Cocke (December 28, 1772 – February 16, 1854) was an American politician and soldier who represented Tennessee's 2nd district in the United States House of Representatives from 1819 to 1827. He also served several terms in the Tennessee Senate and the Tennessee House of Representatives, and was Speaker of the latter for two sessions (1811–1813 and 1837–1839). During the Creek War, Cocke commanded the Eastern Division of the Tennessee militia.

== Early life ==
Cocke was born in Brunswick in Nottoway County in the Colony of Virginia in 1772, the eldest son of frontiersman and future senator, William Cocke, and wife Mary (Maclin) Cocke. While still a young child, he moved with his parents across the Appalachian Mountains to what is now Tennessee, where his father was active in the State of Franklin movement. The family settled in what is now Grainger County, but was then part of Hawkins County. The younger Cocke studied law, and was admitted to the bar in 1793.

Cocke was elected to the inaugural Tennessee Senate in 1796, serving until 1801. In 1807, he was elected to the Tennessee House of Representatives, and was elevated to Speaker in 1811. On April 26, 1808, Cocke shot and mortally wounded Knoxville merchant Thomas Dardis in a duel. In November 1811, during the first year of Cocke's speakership, the House voted to impeach his father, William, then a state supreme court justice.

== Creek War ==
At the outbreak of the War of 1812, Cocke was Major General of the Eastern Division of the Tennessee militia, while Andrew Jackson was Major General of the Western Division. Responding to President James Madison's request for troops, Governor Willie Blount ordered Jackson and the Western Division south to Natchez in early 1813. Though Jackson's army was recalled within a few weeks, members of the Eastern Division grew restless, wanting to join the war. Cocke and a number of men (including his 65-year-old father, William) joined Colonel John Williams on a raid into the Seminole country of Florida in February 1813.

Following the Fort Mims massacre in August 1813, Governor Blount ordered both Jackson and Cocke to invade Alabama and quell the hostile Red Stick Creeks. Since Jackson had received his commission earlier than Cocke, he was the senior commander. Planning to march against Talladega in November 1813, Jackson waited impatiently for Cocke's arrival at Fort Strother. Cocke, however, halted before reaching the fort, and instead dispatched James White to attack the Hillabee Creeks, not knowing Jackson had already made peace with them. White destroyed several Hillabee villages and killed dozens of tribesmen. The enraged Hillabees quickly renewed hostilities.

Jackson believed Cocke was attempting to impede the operation. Cocke, however, suggested Jackson's peace with the Hillabee was a hoax, and that his victory over the Hillabee was too much for Jackson's "noble soul to bear." By the time Cocke arrived at Fort Strother in December 1813, many of Jackson's men, believing their enlistments had ended, had gone home. Realizing the enlistments of Cocke's men were almost up, Jackson sent them back to East Tennessee, and ordered Cocke to recruit more troops to help him put an end to the Creek resistance.

By early 1814, Jackson had become irritated that Cocke had not arrived with reinforcements. When Cocke's newly recruited army finally moved south in March 1814, it stalled at Lookout Mountain, near modern Chattanooga, as the new recruits quarreled with officers over the length of their enlistment. Several officers reported to Jackson that Cocke was spreading rumors about Jackson among the men, telling them they had been drafted illegally, or that Jackson would ignore their terms of enlistment and order them to stay as long as he pleased. Incensed, Jackson had Cocke arrested. He was court-martialed in December 1814, but was acquitted.

== Congress and later life ==
Following the death of John Sevier in 1815, Cocke ran for his vacant seat in the U.S. House of Representatives, but was narrowly defeated by William Grainger Blount, 1,583 votes to 1,355. He ran against Blount in 1817, but was again narrowly defeated, 3,627 votes to 3,429. In 1819, Blount decided not to run for reelection, and Cocke was finally able to win the seat, edging James Porter, 3,792 votes to 3,434. He ran opposed for reelection in 1821 and 1823. In 1825, rising anti-Jackson politician Thomas D. Arnold challenged him for reelection, but Cocke won by a vote of 4,770 to 3,343. A Democratic-Republican, Cocke served in the Sixteenth, Seventeenth, Eighteenth, and Nineteenth congresses. During the Eighteenth and Nineteenth congresses (1823–1827), Cocke was chairman of the House Committee on Indian Affairs.

As a congressman, Cocke generally opposed federal involvement in internal improvement projects. While he voted in favor of a bill that would have provided appropriations for the repair of the Cumberland Road in 1822, he vigorously opposed legislation that would have empowered the president to designate certain improvement projects as having "national worth," and thus eligible for federal funding. In 1823, he voted against federal appropriations for numerous improvement projects, including improvements to the Mississippi and Ohio rivers, an extension of the Cumberland Road, and a purchase of stock in the Chesapeake and Delaware Canal Company.

Cocke did not seek reelection in 1827, and returned to Tennessee, where he engaged in agricultural pursuits. In 1837, he was again elected to the Tennessee House of Representatives, and served as Speaker for the 1837–1839 session. In 1843, he was again elected to the Tennessee Senate, serving a single term. In 1844, he introduced legislation establishing the Tennessee School for the Deaf in Knoxville.

Cocke died in Rutledge, Tennessee, on February 16, 1854, at age 81 years. He is interred at Rutledge's Methodist Church Cemetery.

== Family ==
Cocke's father, William, played a prominent role in the establishment of Tennessee in the late 18th century, and served alongside William Blount as one of the state's inaugural U.S. Senators. Cocke's nephew, William Michael Cocke, served in Congress in the late 1840s. Cocke married his first cousin, Sarah Stratton Cocke. Their daughter, Eliza, married Knoxville industrialist Marcus De Lafayette Bearden (1793–1854) in 1821. Another daughter, Sarah, was married to Judge William B. Reese, who later became a justice of the Tennessee Supreme Court, and served as president of East Tennessee University (the forerunner of the University of Tennessee) in the 1850s. Notable descendants of Cocke include Admiral Alan Goodrich Kirk, who commanded the Normandy landings in 1944, art collector Francis Henry Taylor, and Senator Luke Lea.

U.S. House of Representatives
Preceded by William G. Blount	Member of the U.S. House of Representatives from Tennessee's 2nd congressional district 1819–1827	Succeeded by Pryor Lea
