= James White (general) =

American politician and founder of Knoxville, Tennessee (1747–1821)

2nd and 5th Speaker of the Tennessee Senate
- In office 1797
- Preceded by: James Winchester
- Succeeded by: William Blount
- In office 1801–1805
- Preceded by: Alexander Outlaw
- Succeeded by: Joseph McMinn

Member of the Tennessee Senate
- In office March 28, 1796 – 1797
- Succeeded by: William Blount
- Constituency: Knox County (1796–1797)
- In office September 21, 1801 – August 4, 1804
- Preceded by: John Crawford
- Succeeded by: Robert Houston
- Constituency: Knox County (1801); Anderson, Knox, and Roane Counties (1803–1804)

Member of the North Carolina House of Commons from Hawkins County
- In office November 2, 1789 – December 22, 1789 Serving with Thomas King
- Preceded by: William Cocke

Personal details
- Born: 1747 Province of North Carolina
- Died: August 15, 1821 (aged 73–74) Knoxville, Tennessee, U.S.
- Resting place: First Presbyterian Church Cemetery, Knoxville
- Spouse: Mary Lawson (m. 1770; died 1819)
- Children: 7, including Hugh Lawson White

Military service
- Allegiance: United States
- Branch/service: North Carolina militia Tennessee Militia
- Years of service: 1779–1781 (North Carolina Militia), 1790–1814
- Rank: Brigadier General
- Commands: Hamilton District militia
- Battles/wars: American Revolutionary War; Cherokee–American wars; War of 1812; Creek War

James White (1747 – August 15, 1821) was an American politician, frontiersman, and soldier who founded Knoxville, Tennessee, in the early 1790s. Born in the Province of North Carolina, White served as a captain in the county militia during the American Revolutionary War. In 1783, he led an expedition into the upper Tennessee Valley, where he discovered the future site of Knoxville. White served in various official capacities with the failed State of Franklin (1784–1788) before building James White's Fort in 1786. In 1789, he was a member of the North Carolina House of Commons from Hawkins County, which later became part of the Southwest Territory. James White's fort was chosen as the capital of the Southwest Territory in 1790, and White donated the land for a permanent city, Knoxville, in 1791. He represented Knox County at Tennessee's constitutional convention in 1796. He was first elected the speaker of the Tennessee Senate in 1797 and resigned in the first session. He was later re-elected speaker in 1801. White was a brigadier general in the Tennessee militia in the Creek War during the War of 1812.

White had a reputation for patience and tactfulness that was often lacking in his fellow settlers on the Appalachian frontier. As lieutenant colonel commandant of the Knox County militia, White managed to defuse a number of potentially hostile situations between the settlers and the local Native Americans. He donated the land for many of Knoxville's early public buildings, and helped establish Blount College (now the University of Tennessee). White's descendants continued to play prominent roles in the political and economic affairs of Knoxville into the twentieth century.

== Biography ==
=== Early life ===
James White was born as the son of Moses White and Mary (née McConnel or McConnell) White. His father Moses White came to America from Ireland in 1742. His mother was the sister of Andrew McConnell who came from Ireland in 1740. The McConnell's and White's would stay together as a family group from Virginia to the Carolina's and into Tennessee.James White's father had five other sons; Moses, John, William, David, and Andy. James White has been said by some to have been born in Rowan County, North Carolina, in 1747, at which time the county was not in existence, or in what is today Iredell County, North Carolina. According to William J. MacArthur Jr., James White was born in Salisbury, North Carolina.

James White might be the James White who was assaulted by a William Nelson and Willis Smith in 1767 or 1768, who were both charged with assault in the district of Salisbury, tried, and found not guilty. On April 14, 1770, White married Mary Lawson. White served as a captain in either the Mecklenburg County Regiment or the Rowan County Regiment of the North Carolina militia during the American Revolution, which would subsequently entitle him to a tract of land as payment for his service.

As a result of North Carolina's Land Grab Act, which opened up lands in what is now East Tennessee to settlement, White and several others explored the Tennessee Valley as far west as what is now Lenoir City in 1783. White eventually obtained a grant for a 1,000-acre (400 ha) tract of land at what is now Knoxville, and in 1784 he was elected to the senate of the new State of Franklin, a position which kept him preoccupied for the next two years. White relocated to what is now Knox County in 1785, initially building a simple cabin at what is now the Riverdale community east of modern Knoxville. Within a year, however, he had moved to his 1,000-acre (4.0 km^{2}) tract along the confluence of First Creek and the Tennessee River, and built what became known as White's Fort. His slaves accompanied him to his new home. The area in which he settled was Cherokee territory according to the Federal Treaty of Hopewell. White attended the Third Franklin Convention which was held in Greeneville, Tennessee in 1785. Also in 1785, White became one of the first speakers of the senate of Franklin, later he became a member of the Franklin House of Commons.

=== White's Fort ===
In 1786, White and fellow explorer James Connor erected a fort and a cabin on a hill overlooking the confluence of First Creek and the Tennessee River. William Blount, governor of the Territory South of the River Ohio, chose the fort as the Territory's capital. On November 3, 1790, Blount commissioned White first major in the Hawkins County militia and appointed him as a justice of the peace. The following year, White set aside a portion of his land for the creation a territorial capital, named "Knoxville" after Henry Knox, the United States Secretary of War. The new city was platted by White's son-in-law, Charles McClung, and lots were sold in October 1791.

Upon creation of Knox County in 1792, White became lieutenant colonel commandant of the new county's militia. This appointment came during the latter years of the Cherokee–American wars, a period of heightened hostilities between the Chickamauga Cherokee and the white settlers. In 1793, White defused a potentially violent situation when he dispersed a mob of angry settlers that had amassed at Gamble's Station for a march against the Overhill towns. The Cherokee considered White a man of honor, and the Creeks praised his "goodness."

In 1796, White represented Knox County at Tennessee's constitutional convention (which took place near his fort). After the admission of the state to the Union, White was elected brigadier general of the new state's Hamilton District (which included what is now Knox, Jefferson, Blount, and Sevier counties), and was elected to the state senate. Upon William Blount's return from the U.S. Senate in 1797, White resigned to allow Blount to run for the seat. In 1798, White helped negotiate the First Treaty of Tellico.

=== Creek War ===
Following the Fort Mims massacre of August 1813, Andrew Jackson and John Coffee led the Tennessee militia into northern Alabama in October of that year to engage a contingent of hostile "Red Stick" Creeks. The militiamen scored victories at the Battle of Tallushatchee (November 3) and at the Battle of Talladega (November 9). In the aftermath of the latter, one of the hostile groups, the Hillabee, made peace arrangements with Jackson. However, the Tennessee militia's East Tennessee contingent, led by John Cocke, had arrived around the same time from Fort Armstrong, and was unaware of the peace negotiations.

On November 11, Cocke ordered James White, leader of the Hamilton District militia, to destroy the Hillabee towns. Over the next several days, White attacked the villages of Little Oakfusky and Genalga, burning 123 houses and capturing several Hillabees. On November 18, White dispatched a force of allied Cherokee under Gideon Morgan to surround the main Hillabee town. The Hillabee, believing they had made peace, were unprepared for an attack, and were unable to resist Morgan's assault. The town was destroyed, 64 Hillabees were killed, and several hundred were captured.

The destruction of the Hillabee towns, sometimes called the "Hillabee Massacre," greatly agitated Jackson, who believed the withdrawal of the Hillabee would demoralize the remaining Red Sticks. To further complicate matters, the East Tennesseans' terms of service were about to expire. In December, Jackson ordered Cocke and the East Tennessee militiamen to return home. The enraged Hillabee quickly rejoined the Red Stick Confederacy, and fought until the end of the war.

== Later life ==
In 1800, White moved to his country estate east of Knoxville, perhaps having grown weary of the city, which had developed into a rowdy frontier capital. He was again elected to the state senate in 1801 and 1803. White served as an elder in the Lebanon-in-the-Forks Presbyterian Church, and later served as an elder in the First Presbyterian Church in Knoxville, which stood on land White had set aside for a church in the 1790s. His wife Mary Lawson White, with whom he had seven children, died on March 10, 1819. White died on August 15, 1821, at his country estate, and was buried next to his wife in the First Presbyterian Church Cemetery.

== Legacy ==
White's descendants played prominent political and economic roles in Knoxville's development for more than a century after his death. His eldest son, Hugh Lawson White, was a United States Senator, and ran for president on the Whig ticket in 1836. Along with Charles McClung, White's sons-in-law included Judge John Overton (married to Mary White), a cofounder of Memphis, Tennessee, and Senator John Williams (married to Melinda White). His other descendants include Congressman Joseph Lanier Williams, railroad magnate Charles McClung McGhee, Admiral Richmond P. Hobson, and playwright Tennessee Williams.

In 1970, White's Fort was reconstructed as a museum in downtown Knoxville. White's cabin, which provides the fort's southwest corner, is the only surviving authentic part of the fort, although it had been dismantled and moved several times over the years before being reassembled at its present location. White's other namesakes in Knoxville include the General James White Memorial Civic Coliseum, the James White Parkway, and the James White Greenway.

In the early 1990s, Pamela Dishongh, who was conducting a survey of the Riverdale Historic District in eastern Knox County for its inclusion in the National Register of Historic Places, discovered what was believed to have been White's first cabin (1785) in Knox County on the front lawn of the McNutt-Campbell-Kennedy House. A subsequent archaeological survey of the site led by University of Tennessee archaeologist Charles Faulkner confirmed the cabin was probably built by White. Faulkner suggests the cabin was a very simple log structure meant to provide temporary shelter.
