= Turkey Town, Alabama =

Turkey Town
- Unincorporated community
- Location in Alabama.
- Coordinates: 34°08′10″N 85°41′30″W
- Country: United States
- State: Alabama
- County: Cherokee
- Elevation: 545 ft (166 m)
- Time zone: UTC-6 (Central (CST))
  - Summer (DST): UTC-5 (CDT)
- Area codes: 256 & 938
- GNIS feature ID: 136995

Turkey Town is a ghost town in Cherokee County, in the U.S. state of Alabama.

The town was the largest Cherokee town in Alabama, originally spanning 25 miles (40 km) along both sides of the Coosa River.

== History ==
The community grew up around the Cherokee town Turkeytown. A post office called Turkey Town was established in 1828, and remained in operation until it was discontinued in 1861. The community was named after the village, which was named in honor of the Cherokee chief Little Turkey.
