= Chinnabee, Alabama =

- Unincorporated community
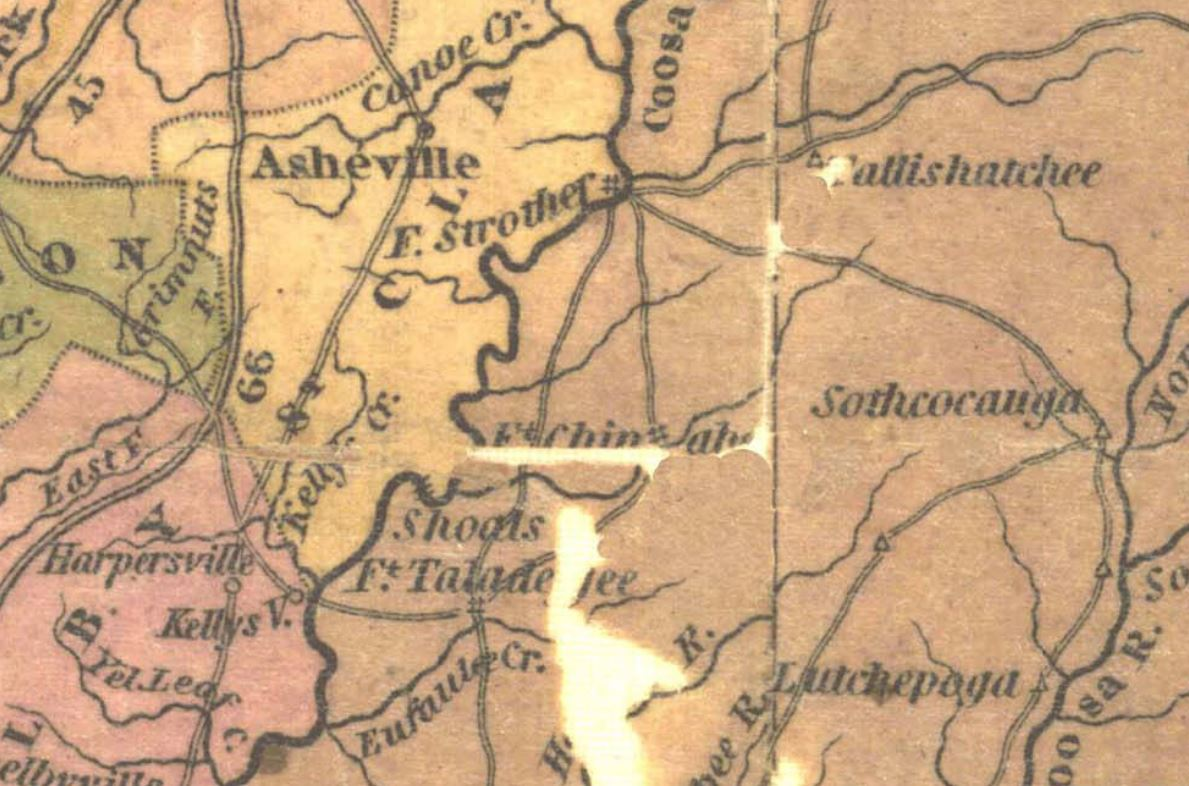
- Fort Chinnabee (located in the center) as portrayed in Henry Schenck Tanner's 1830 The Traveler's Pocket Map of Alabama.

- Location within Alabama Location within the United States
- Coordinates: 33°27′46″N 85°58′01″W
- Country: United States
- State: Alabama
- County: Talladega
- Elevation: 594 ft (181 m)
- Time zone: UTC-6 (Central (CST))
  - Summer (DST): UTC-5 (CDT)
- Area codes: 256 & 938
- GNIS feature ID: 159395

Chinnabee, also spelled Chinneby or Chinnibee, is an unincorporated community in Talladega County, Alabama, United States.

== History ==
The community was named for Fort Chinnabee, which was in turn named for Selocta Chinneby, who was a Creek chief. Chinneby is most likely derived from the Muscogee words achina meaning "cedar" and api meaning "tree". Chinnabee is located on the former Louisville and Nashville Railroad.

A post office operated under the name Chinnibee from 1840 to 1884.

The Chinnabee Cotton Mills Corporation was incorporated in 1902. The mill operated at least 1,500 spindles and produced yarn.

== Fort Chinnabee ==
Fort Chinnabee was a defensive stockade built in 1813 by Chief Chinnabee and other allied Creeks for protection against Red Sticks during the Creek War. The fort was built three miles north of Chinnabee's village on the north shore of Choccolocco Creek near the influx of Wolfskull Creek, six miles east of Oxford.
