= William Grainger Blount =

American politician

Member of the U.S. House of Representatives from Tennessee's 2nd district
- In office December 8, 1815 – March 3, 1819
- Preceded by: John Sevier
- Succeeded by: John Alexander Cocke

Secretary of State of Tennessee
- In office 1811–1815
- Governor: Willie Blount
- Preceded by: Robert Houston
- Succeeded by: William Alexander

Personal details
- Born: 1784 Craven County, North Carolina, U.S.
- Died: May 21, 1827 (aged 42–43) Paris, Tennessee, U.S.
- Resting place: City Cemetery in Paris, Tennessee
- Party: Democratic-Republican
- Relations: William Blount (father); Thomas Blount (uncle); Willie Blount (uncle)
- Profession: Attorney, farmer

William Grainger Blount (1784 – May 21, 1827) was an American politician who represented Tennessee's 2nd district in the United States House of Representatives from 1815 to 1819. He is the son of Southwest Territory governor William Blount and nephew of Tennessee governor Willie Blount, serving under the latter as Tennessee Secretary of State from 1811 to 1815.

== Life and career ==
Blount was born near New Bern, North Carolina, in Craven County, the eldest son of William Blount and Mary Grainger Blount. He attended the New Bern Academy. In 1792, following his father's appointment as Governor of the Southwest Territory, he moved with his parents to Knoxville, which had been chosen as the new territorial capital. He studied law and was admitted to the bar in 1805. He was never married and had no known children.

Blount practiced law in Knoxville. He also engaged in agricultural pursuits. In 1811, he was elected to the Tennessee House of Representatives. Shortly afterward, the General Assembly elected him Secretary of State of Tennessee. Serving alongside his uncle, Governor Willie Blount, he helped coordinate the state's War of 1812 efforts, and certified the "Walker Line" as the boundary between Tennessee and Kentucky.

Following the death of John Sevier in 1815, Blount was elected to his seat in the U.S. House of Representatives, narrowly defeating John Cocke by a vote of 1,583 to 1,355. He was reelected in 1817, again defeating Cocke by a narrow margin, 3,627 votes to 3,429. Serving as a Democratic-Republican in the Fourteenth and Fifteenth congresses, Blount consistently sought the creation of new postal routes throughout his district, including a route connecting Maryville and Sevierville, a route connecting Sevierville and Dandridge, and a route connecting Morganton, Tennessee, with Carnesville, Georgia. He voted in favor of an 1816 bill reaffirming the nation's neutrality, and voted against the Bonus Bill of 1817 (he also voted in favor of sustaining President James Madison's veto of the Bonus Bill).

Choosing not to run for a third term, Blount resumed his practice of law in Knoxville. In 1818, he became owner of Blount Mansion, the house his father had built in the city. He moved to Paris, Tennessee, in 1826, where he continued to practice law. He died on May 21, 1827, and is interred in the City Cemetery in Paris, Tennessee.

Political offices
Preceded by Robert Houston	Secretary of State of Tennessee; 1811–1815	Succeeded by William Alexander
U.S. House of Representatives
Preceded by John Sevier	Member of the U.S. House of Representatives from Tennessee's 2nd congressional district December 8, 1815–March 3, 1819	Succeeded by John A. Cocke
