= Battles of Emuckfaw and Enotachopo Creek =

Battles fought during the Creek War

Coordinates: 32°58′21.6″N 85°44′11.82″W

- Part of Creek War
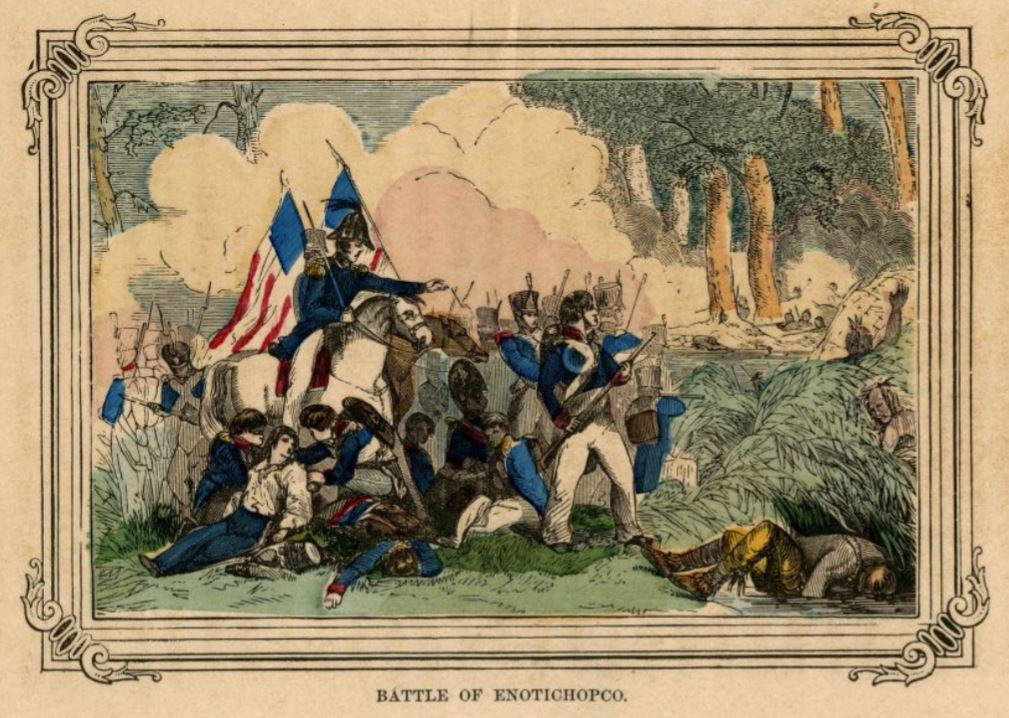
- American officer rallying troops during the Battle of Enotachopo.
Date	January 22–24, 1814
Location	20–50 mi (32–80 km) northwest of Horseshoe Bend
Result	Indecisive

Belligerents
Red Stick Creek	United States; Lower Creek; Cherokee

Commanders and leaders
Red Eagle	Andrew Jackson

Strength
400–500 warriors	American: 175 militia 30 artillery Native American: ~200 warriors

Casualties and losses
54 killed, unknown wounded	24 killed 71 wounded

The battles of Emuckfaw and Enotachopo Creek (or Enotachopco Creek) were part of Andrew Jackson's campaign in the Creek War. They took place in January 1814, approximately 20–50 mi (32–80 km) northeast of Horseshoe Bend.

== Background ==
After Talladega, Jackson was plagued by supply shortages and discipline problems arising from his men's short-term enlistments. General John Coffee, who had returned to Tennessee for remounts, wrote Jackson that the cavalry had deserted. By the end of 1813, Jackson was down to a single regiment whose enlistments were due to expire in mid-January. Although Governor Willie Blount had ordered a new levy of 2,500 troops, Jackson would not be up to full strength until the end of February. When a draft of 900 raw recruits arrived unexpectedly on January 14, Jackson was down to a cadre of 103 and Coffee, who had been "abandoned by his men." Jackson's men consisted of 175 militia and 30 artillery before the battle and were aided by Lower Creek and Cherokee natives, who had around 200 warriors. The Creek numbered between 400 and 500 warriors.

== Battles ==
Since new men had sixty-day enlistment contracts, Jackson decided to get the most out of his untried force. He departed Fort Strother on the seventeenth and marched toward the village of Emuckfaw to cooperate with the Georgia Militia. However, this was a risky decision. It was a long march through difficult terrain against a numerically superior force, and the men were inexperienced and insubordinate. A defeat of Jackson would have prolonged the war.

On January 22, 1814, Jackson was encamped about 12 miles (19 km) from Emuckfaw. At dawn, a strong force of Red Sticks, camped 3 miles (4.8 km) away, attacked Jackson's position but were driven off after about thirty minutes. Jackson sent Coffee with a force of 400 to burn the Indian camp. Upon seeing the strength of their position, Coffee did not attack and returned to Jackson's position. The Red Sticks attacked again. Coffee was seriously wounded when he led a small party to turn their flank. The Creek were driven off with a loss of 54 killed. At this point, Jackson had no choice but to retreat to Fort Strother.

Because of the difficulty of the earlier crossing of the Emuckfaw Creek, Jackson took a longer route back to Fort Strother. Even so, the crossing was difficult. On the morning of January 24, 1814, he began to re-cross the creek. When Jackson's artillery was about to enter the ford, alarm shots sounded in the woods. Having anticipated an attack, Jackson had ordered his advance guard to counterattack and attempt an envelopment. The rear guard panicked and retreated. For reasons unknown, the Red Sticks were unable to take advantage of the situation, and a handful of defenders drove them off. Jackson's losses for the two engagements were 24 killed and 71 wounded. The Creek's casualties were 54 killed and an unknown number of wounded.

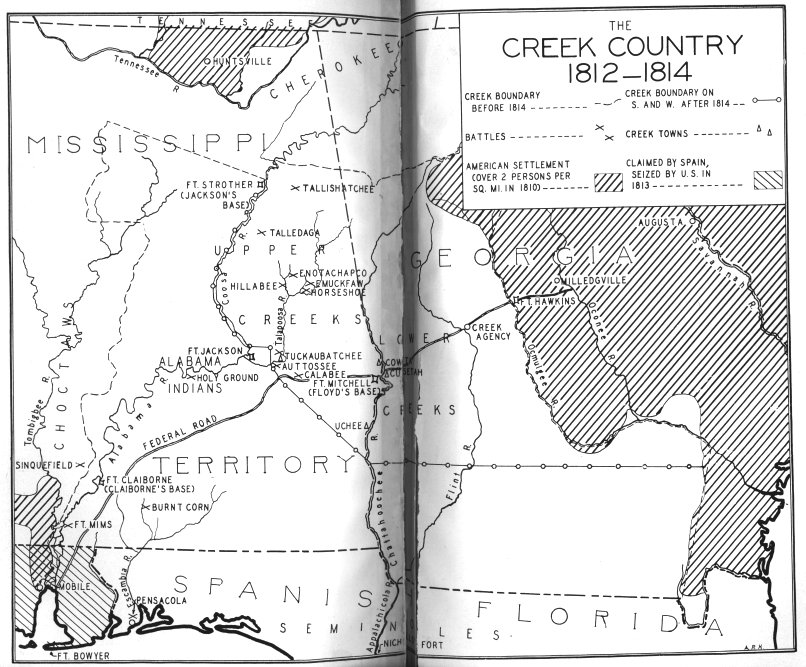
Map of events during the Creek War. Emuckfaw and Enotachopo battle sites located in the left center.

== Aftermath ==
Although Jackson had been forced to withdraw, the Red Sticks had lost their best opportunity for a decisive victory against the American forces. Jackson returned to Fort Strother and did not resume the offensive until mid-March.
