= Lay Dam =

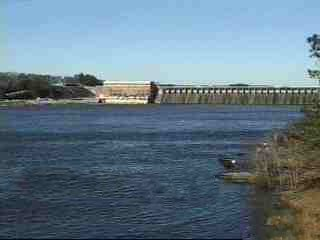
- Lay Dam, Coosa River, Alabama

- Oroville Dam Lay Dam (the United States)
- Country: United States
- Location: Clanton, Alabama
- Coordinates: 32°57′49″N 86°31′00″W
- Purpose: Water supply, flood control, power
- Status: Operational
- Construction began: 1914

Dam and spillways
- Impounds: Coosa River

Power Station
- Coordinates

Alabama Register of Landmarks and Heritage
- Designated: February 19, 1976

Lay Dam is a hydroelectric power dam on the Coosa River in Chilton County and Coosa County, near Clanton, Alabama.

The concrete run-of-the-river gravity dam was built in 1914 as the first major project of Alabama Power Company, and named for Captain William Patrick Lay, its first president. The dam's hydroelectric facility has a generating capacity of 177 megawatts (237,000 hp).

The construction of the dam flooded the original site of Fort Williams, which was used during the Creek War.

== Lay Lake ==
Lay Lake covers 12,000 acres (4,900 ha) and has a shoreline about 289 miles (465 km) long. It is a recreational lake with fishing opportunities for large mouth bass, spotted bass, bluegill and other sunfish, crappie, catfish, striped bass, hybrid and white bass. Lay Lake has hosted the Bassmaster Classic four times: 1996, 2002, 2007, and 2010. Alabama Power maintains seven public access sites on the lake.

== Gallery ==
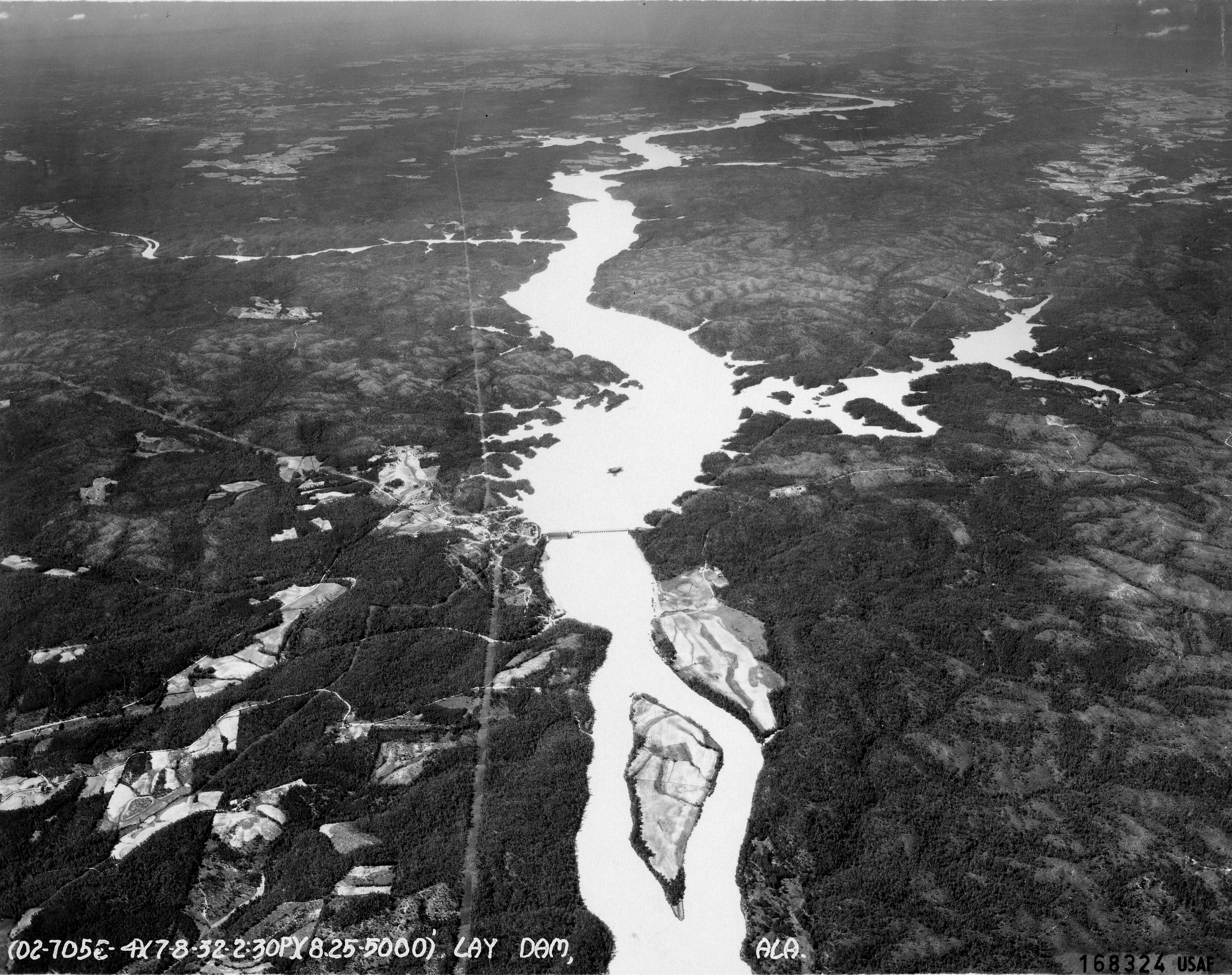
Lay Dam in 1932, the lines through the forest are high-voltage transmission line corridors from the hydroelectric plant

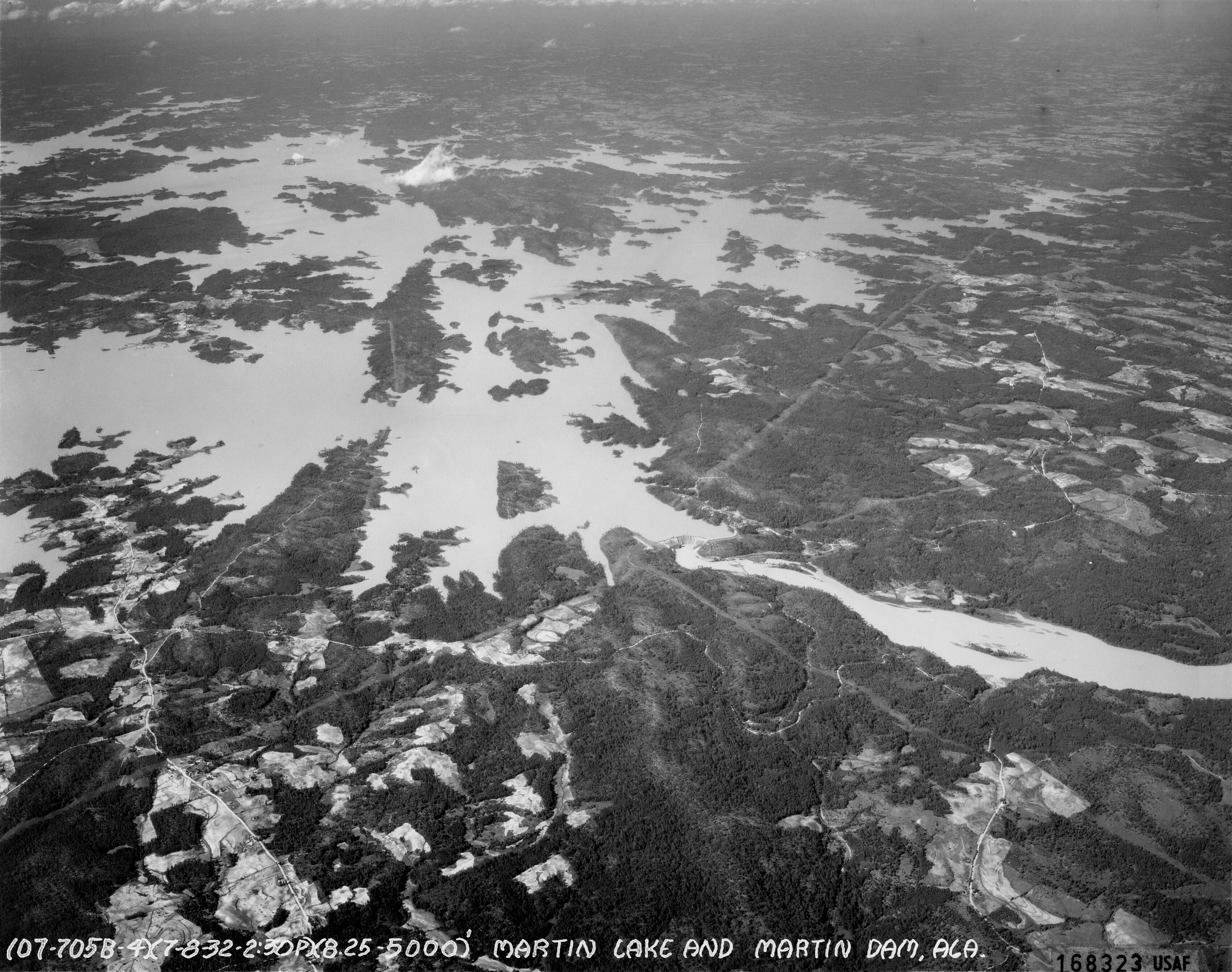
Martin Dam and Lake in 1932
