= Fort Williams (Alabama) =

United States historic site

- Fayetteville, Alabama in United States
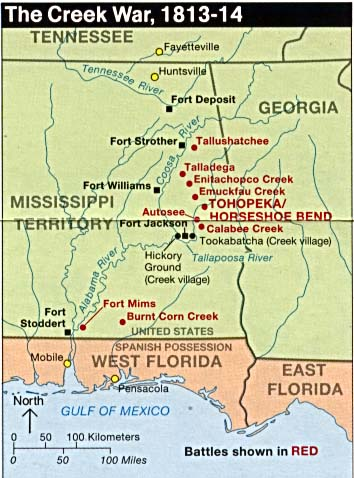
- Location of Fort Williams during the Creek War (map erroneously shows the fort on the western side of the Coosa River)

Site information
- Type: Stockade fort
- Owner: Private
- Controlled by: Private
- Open to the public: No
- Condition: Inundated by Lay Lake

Location
- Location within Alabama Location within the United States
- Coordinates: 33°08′25″N 86°27′54″W

Site history
- Built: 1814
- Built by: United States Army
- In use: 1814-1832
- Battles/wars: Creek War

Fort Williams Cemetery
- Interactive map of Fort Williams Cemetery
- Location: Fayetteville, Alabama

History
- Founded: 1813

Alabama Register of Landmarks and Heritage
- Official name: Fort Williams Cemetery
- Designated: May 12, 1976

Fort Williams was a supply depot built in early 1814 in preparation for the Battle of Horseshoe Bend. It was located in Alabama on the southeast shore where Cedar Creek meets the Coosa River, near Talladega Springs.

== History ==
=== Creek War ===
During the Creek War (part of the larger War of 1812), General Andrew Jackson dispatched Colonel John Williams and the 39th Infantry Regiment from Fort Strother. The regiment brought supplies to the area where Fort Williams would be built and were met there by Jackson. A fort was erected at this site under the direction of topographical engineer Howell Tatum on March 22, 1814 and named for Colonel Williams. The supplies were originally transported down the Coosa River from Fort Armstrong prior to arriving at Fort Strother. The site of Fort Williams was chosen as it was equidistant from Fort Strother to Holy Ground. The majority of Jackson's forces were garrisoned at Fort Williams prior to the Battle of Horseshoe Bend, and blazed a 52-mile trail from the fort to the battle site. Jackson left a small group of men from Brigadier General Thomas Johnson's brigade or George Doherty's brigade at Fort Williams in reserve. After the battle, Jackson returned to Fort Williams on April 2, then marched the forts provisions to Hickory Ground. Jackson remained at Fort Williams for five days prior to marching to Hickory Ground. The soldiers who were killed at Horseshoe Bend were buried in a cemetery at Fort Williams. After William Weatherford surrendered to Jackson at Fort Jackson, Major General Thomas Pinckney took command of the forces at Fort Jackson. A Captain Houck was left in command of Fort Williams after the main force left for Fort Jackson. Pinckney later commanded Jackson to return to Fort Williams and search for any hostile Creeks in the Cahaba River Valley.

In the latter part of 1814, Fort Williams was under the command of Major Jasper Smith and the West Tennessee Milita.

The Jackson Trace, a military road, once connected Fort Strother and Fort Williams.

=== Postwar ===
Fort Williams was used as a holding area for Creeks during the Trail of Tears as part of the Indian Removal. An unknown number of Creeks died here due to scarce provisions and were buried in unmarked graves in the adjacent cemetery.

=== Present ===
The original site was submerged under Lay Lake with the 1914 construction of the Lay Dam 14 miles downstream. The headstones from the military cemetery were relocated from their original site in 2006 due to the development of a neighborhood. The Fort Williams Cemetery was added to the Alabama Register of Landmarks and Heritage on May 12, 1976.

== Units ==
The 1st, 2nd, and 3rd Regiment of East Tennessee Militia and the 1st and 4th Regiment West Tennessee Militia were stationed at Fort Williams.

== Sources ==
- Braund, Kathryn E. Holland (2012). Tohopeka: Rethinking the Creek War & the War of 1812. Tuscaloosa, Alabama: University of Alabama Press. ISBN 978-0-8173-5711-5.
- Harris, W. Stuart (1977). Dead Towns of Alabama. Tuscaloosa, Alabama: University of Alabama Press. ISBN 0-8173-1125-4.
- Jackson, Andrew (1926) [Composed 1814]. Bassett, John Spencer (ed.). Correspondence of Andrew Jackson. Vol. 1. Washington, D.C.: Carnegie Institution of Washington.
- Johnston, Kim (2013). Haunted Shelby County, Alabama. Charleston, South Carolina: Haunted America. ISBN 978-1-61423-990-1.
- Miller, G. K. (1911). "General Jackson and the Creek War". The American Monthly Magazine. Vol. XXXIX, no. 2. New York, New York: Daughters of the American Revolution (published August 1911).
- Pickett, Albert James (1878). History of Alabama, and Incidentally of Georgia and Mississippi, from the Earliest Period. Tuscaloosa, Alabama: Willo Publishing Company. ISBN 978-1363310845.
- Weir, Howard (2016). A Paradise of Blood: The Creek War of 1813-14. Yardley, Pennsylvania: Westholme. ISBN 1-59416-270-0.
