= Battle of Talladega =

Battle fought during the Creek War

Coordinates: 33°27′3.32″N 86°10′7.9″W

- Part of the Creek War
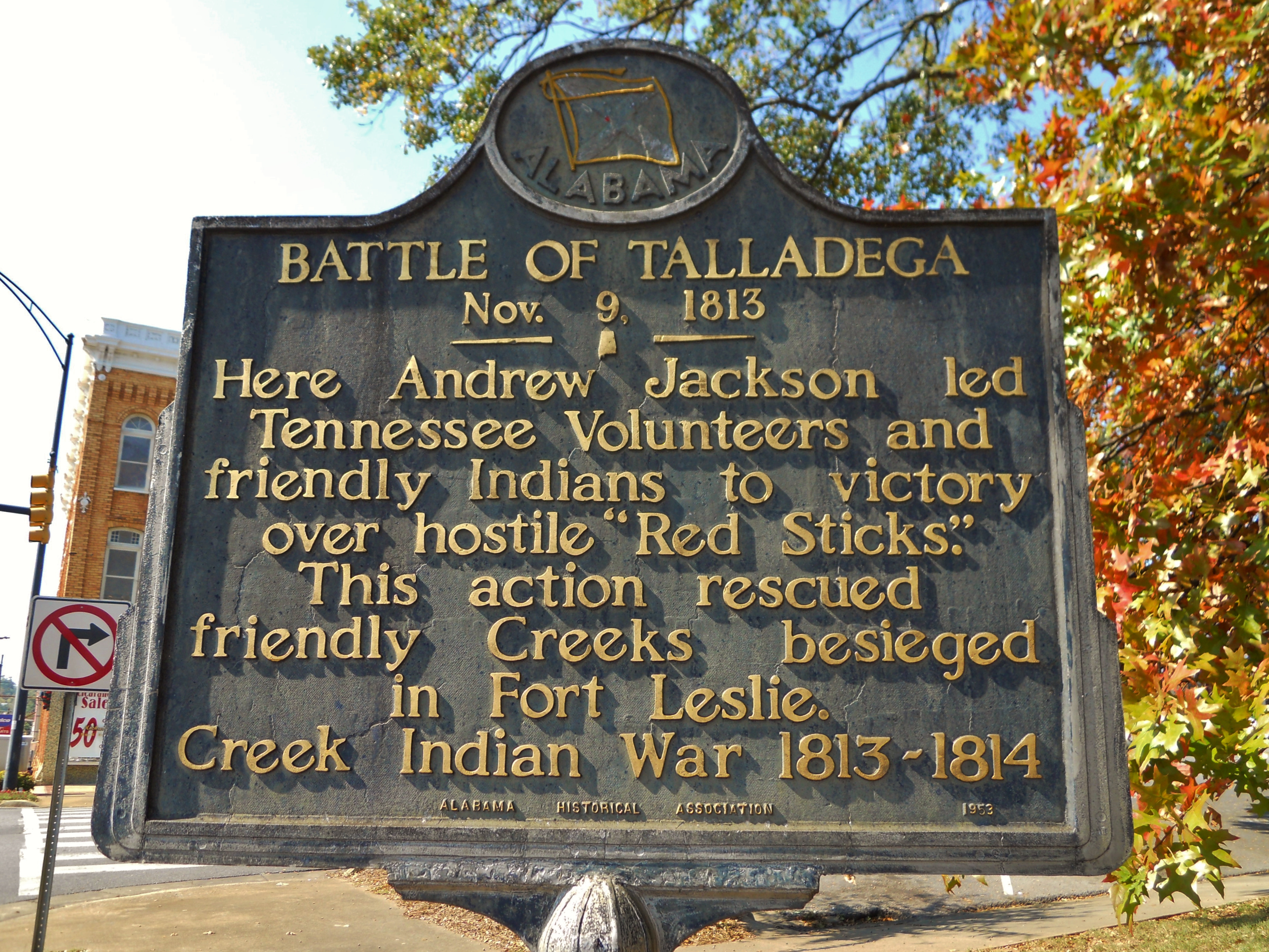
- A historic marker in Talladega, Alabama commemorating General Andrew Jackson's victory over the Red Sticks at the Battle of Talladega
Date	November 9, 1813
Location	Mississippi Territory
Result	U.S. victory

Belligerents
Red Stick Creeks	United States

Commanders and leaders
William Weatherford	Andrew Jackson; John Coffee

Strength
~700 warriors	~1,200 infantry ~800 cavalry

Casualties and losses
~300 killed, ~110 wounded	15 killed ~85 wounded

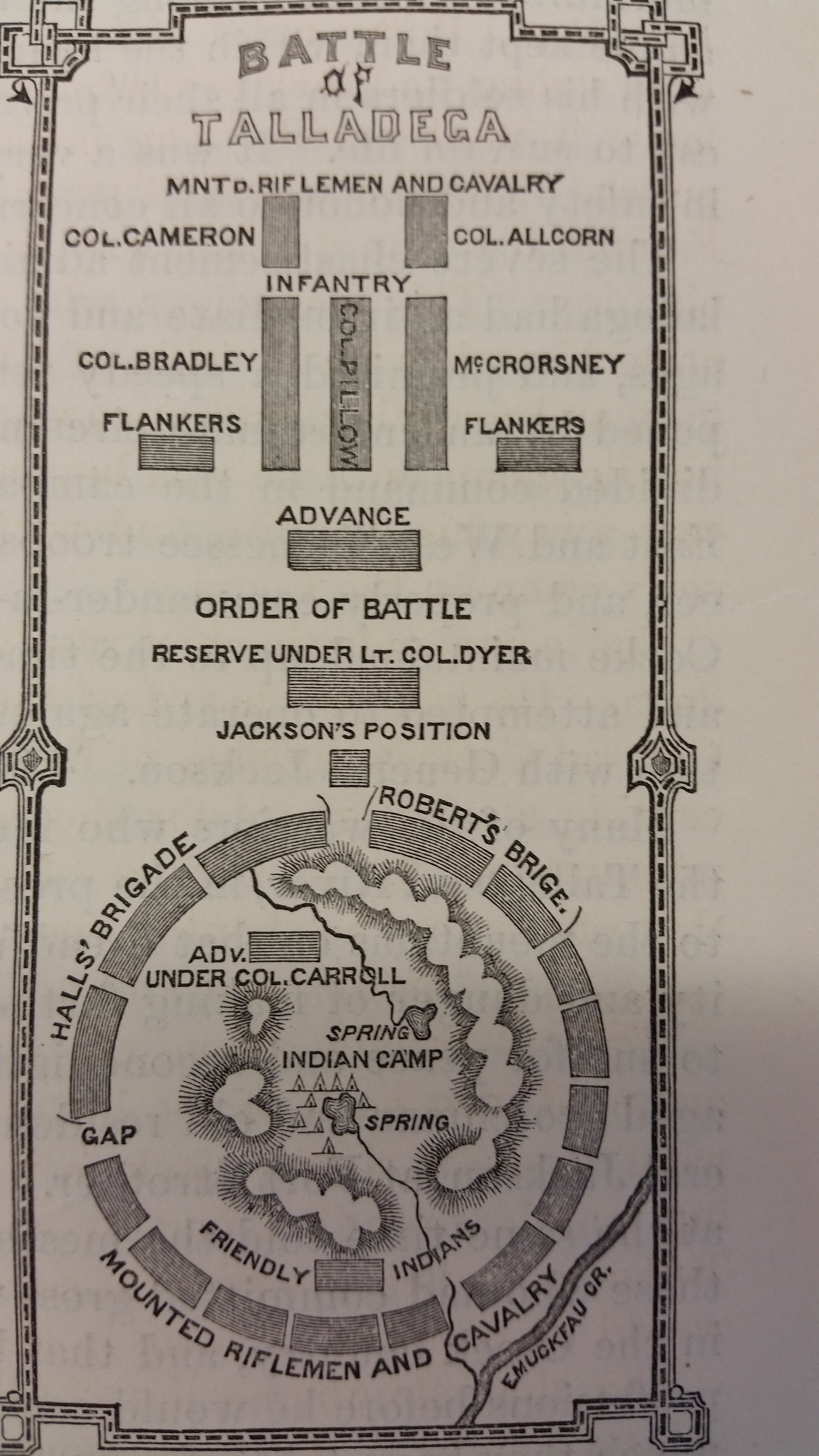
Battle of Talladega

The Battle of Talladega was fought between the Tennessee Militia and the Red Stick Creek Native Americans during the Creek War, in the vicinity of the present-day county and city of Talladega, Alabama, in the United States.

== Background ==
When General John Coffee returned to Fort Strother after defeating the Red Sticks at the Battle of Tallushatchee, General Andrew Jackson received a call for help from allied Creeks who were being besieged by Red Stick rebels at Talladega. Jackson and his force of about 2,000 men (about 1,200 infantry and 800 cavalry) were camped at Ten Islands on the Coosa River, near the present day Neely Henry Dam. The Creeks under command of Weatherford numbered about 700 warriors. A few white men and about 150 allied Indians were inside a small stockade named Fort Leslie (it is often called Fort Lashley mistakenly). Fort Leslie was built around the trading post of a Mr. Leslie.

== Battle ==
On November 9, 1813, Jackson's army arrived outside the village. The Red Sticks inflicted 17 casualties on Jackson's forces. Jackson inflicted 299 casualties on the Red Sticks and drove them from the field.

== Aftermath ==
Casualties for the Creeks numbered about 300 killed and about 110 wounded. Jackson's casualties numbered 15 killed and around 85 wounded. After the battle, there was a significant lull in the fighting between the Red Sticks and Jackson's army. By December, the U.S. force was down to almost 500 because of desertion and enlistments running out. In January, in order to support the Georgia militia, Jackson marched toward the village of Emuckfaw with an inexperienced force. This move resulted in the battles of Emuckfaw and Enotachopo Creek. After these battles Jackson retired to Fort Strother. When Jackson received additional reinforcements (some of the regular U.S. troops), he once again went on the offensive and met the Red Sticks at the Battle of Horseshoe Bend. Soldiers like Thomas McElderry would go to receive land from friendly natives in return for service after the battle. Area around the land given to McElderry later became McElderry Station, Alabama.

Captain Isaac L. Baker passed by the battlefield on August 3, 1814, and recorded in his journal, "We saw many of the skeletons still on the field."

== Sources ==
- Borneman, Walter R. (2004). 1812: The War That Forged a Nation. New York: Harper Perennial. ISBN 978-0-06-053112-6.
