= Red Sticks =

Faction of Muscogee Creek people in the early 19th century

Red Sticks Ēcatēcvlke
- Leader: William Weatherford; Menawa; Peter McQueen; Neamathla; Chipco; Opothleyahola; Jim Boy; Josiah Francis (Hillis Hadjo); Homathlemico
- Founded: May 10, 1814; 212 years ago
- Ideology: Indigenism; Creek nationalism Traditionalism; Communalism
- Colours: Red

Red Sticks (Creek: Ēcatēcvlke; also Redsticks, Batons Rouges, or Red Clubs) refers to an early 19th century traditionalist faction of Muscogee (Creek people) in the Southeastern United States. Made up mostly of Creek of the Upper Towns that supported traditional leadership and culture, as well as the preservation of communal land for cultivation and hunting, the Red Sticks arose at a time of increasing pressure on Creek territory by European American settlers. Creek of the Lower Towns were closer to the settlers, had more mixed-race families, and had already been forced to make land cessions to the Americans. In this context, the Red Sticks led a resistance movement against European American encroachment and assimilation, tensions that culminated in the outbreak of the Creek War in 1813. Initially a civil war among the Creek, the conflict drew in United States state forces while the nation was already engaged in the War of 1812 against the British.

== Background ==
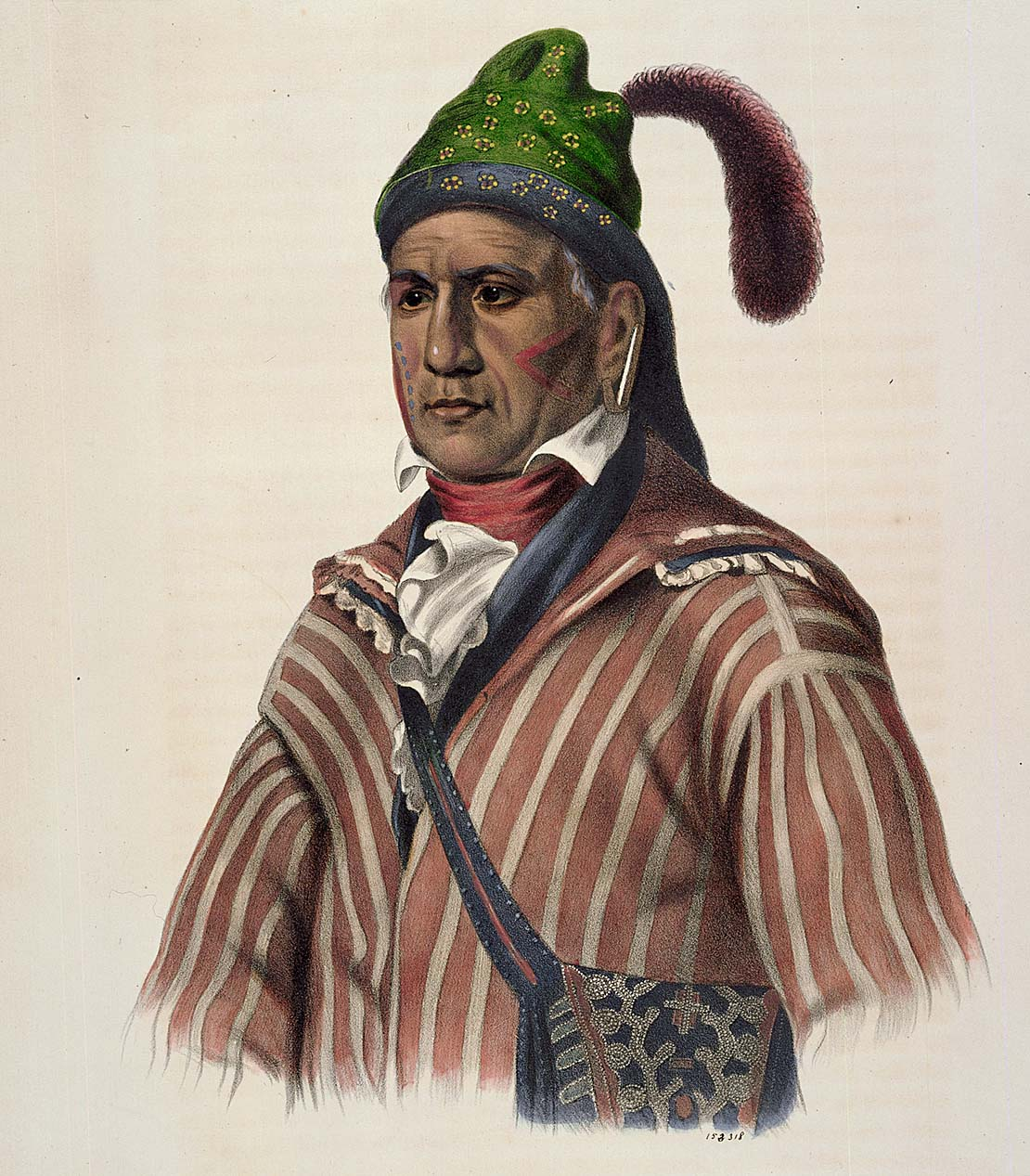
Menawa was one of the principal leaders of the Red Sticks. After the war, he continued to oppose white encroachment on Muscogee lands, visiting Washington, D.C., in 1826 to protest the treaty of Indian Springs. Painted by Charles Bird King, 1837.

The term "Red Sticks" (alternatively "Redsticks" or "Red Clubs"), was derived from the name of the two-foot-long wooden war club, or atássa, used by the Creek. The preferred weapon of the Red Stick warriors, this war club had a red-painted wooden handle with a curve at its head that held a small piece of iron, steel, or bone projecting about two inches. The Red Sticks faction came primarily from the Upper Towns of the Creek Confederacy and supported traditional leadership and culture, including the preservation of communal land for cultivation and hunting, while opposing assimilation into European American culture.

The Creek had a matrilineal culture, in which a person's place and status were determined by their maternal clan. The Creek of the Lower Towns, who comprised the majority of the population, had adopted more European-American ways; in addition, they had more intermarriage among their women with white traders and settlers, and economic relations with the United States settlers. At the same time, the mixed-race children, such as the chiefs William Weatherford and William McIntosh, were generally raised among the Creek. Benjamin Hawkins, who was first appointed as United States Indian agent in the Southeast and then as Superintendent of Indian Affairs in the territory south of the Ohio River, lived among the Creek and Choctaw and knew them well. He commented in letters to President Thomas Jefferson that Creek women were matriarchs and had control of children "when connected with a white man". Hawkins further observed that even wealthy traders were nearly as "inattentive" to their mixed-race children as "the Indians"; Benjamin Griffith argues that Hawkins failed to understand the closer relationship that children in Creek culture had with their mother's eldest brother, closer than with their biological father, because of the importance of the clan structure.

Chief of Coweta, William McIntosh was a leader of the Lower Creek. During the Creek War he opposed the Red Sticks and sided with the Americans instead. He joined Andrew Jackson as a Major who was impressed with him. Because he was half-white and, in Jackson's eyes, "civilized" he was able to gain Jackson's trust and when Georgians attacked friendly Creek settlements only McIntosh's complaints made it to the government. His actions in the Creek War mainly joining Jackson alienated him after the war was over in Creek society. By supplying long rifles in trade, England was one of the principal nations (with Spain) that helped and encouraged Native Americans to fight against America, mainly as a diversionary tactic. Most of their influence with the tribes flowed from the Great Lakes region. That was until Tecumseh visited the Upper Creeks and convinced them to make war against the United States. When incomplete reports of the Creek War reached Vice Admiral Sir Alexander F. I. Cochrane, he was impressed – though he did not know the Creek were in a civil war and that other tribes like the Choctaw, Chickasaw, and Cherokee joined the Americans. He wanted to strike the Gulf Coast and wanted to use the Indians as a diversion from the Canadian theater. He sent Captain Hugh Pigot to reconnoiter. Pigot anchored by the mouth of the Apalachicola River on May 10, 1814. He proceeded to give the Indians arms and a small British attachment of men. Pigot then reported to his superiors that he could have as many as 2,800 Creek and Seminoles trained in 8 to 10 weeks. This report would eventually lead to the Battle of New Orleans six months later.

The time in question was one of increasing pressure on Creek territory by European American settlers. The Creek of the Lower Towns, who were closer to the settlers and had more mixed-race families, had already been forced to make numerous land cessions to the Americans. The Red Stick War, more commonly called the Creek War (1813–1814), was essentially a civil war as the Creek struggled among themselves for their future; after the Lower Creek issued a statement of "unqualified and unanimous friendship for the United States", tensions broke out into violence. Red Sticks attacked the Lower Creek towns. The Red Sticks were backed by the British, who were engaged in the War of 1812 against the United States, and the Spanish, who were trying to retain a foothold in Florida and in territories to the west of the Louisiana Territory.

== Armed actions ==
Map of battlegrounds of the Creek War (U.S. Army Center for Military History)

=== Skirmish over arms ===
The Red Sticks were involved with the skirmish that become known as the Battle of Burnt Corn. The armed conflict occurred when a group of Red Sticks were attacked by American white militiamen while returning from Spanish Florida with arms in 1813. After the initial assault, the Red Sticks regrouped and defeated these troops. While the militia had provoked the attack, frontier settlers and U.S. officials became alarmed about the Red Sticks' actions on the frontier as a result.

=== Massacre at Fort Mims ===
The Red Sticks decided to attack the garrison at Fort Mims in the Mississippi Territory (present-day Tensaw, in southwestern Alabama), in an attempt to reduce the influence of the Tensaw Creek who controlled the fort. Also at the fort were intermarried whites, and other settlers and their slaves from the frontier who had become alarmed after the battle that had occurred at Burnt Corn.

The fort was poorly guarded and the Red Sticks overwhelmed its defenses on 30 August 1813, killing most of the people who had taken refuge there. Estimates of the number of settlers at Fort Mims at the time of the massacre vary from 300 or so to 500 (including whites, slaves, and Lower Creek). Estimates of survivors have varied; at the most, about three dozen have been claimed. At least 100 Creek attackers were found dead at the scene of the battle.

History graduate student Karl Davis, in a manner contrary to prevailing scholarship at the time, interpreted the attack in a journal article treatment as a punitive expedition specifically directed against the Tensaw, a group of Lower Creek who were "separated from core Creek values." Hence, Davis does not believe the Fort Mims attack was representative of the overall conflict between the Upper and Lower Towns.

=== Battle of Horseshoe Bend ===
Jackson led a force of 3,000 men to Horseshoe Bend (Tohopeka in Creek), from Fort Williams on 14 March. This was after his scouts reported a force of 1,000 Red Stick warriors and their families were living there. Jackson's army had to march over 60 miles of rugged terrain. Before they left he gave out a warning that anyone who retreated without being compelled by significant force would be executed.

Jackson's army arrived on March 26 and set up camp six miles away near the site of the battle of Emuckfau Creek. The day before, the Creek's commander, William Weatherford, left to be with his pregnant wife, leaving Chief Menewa in charge. Jackson's cavalry, under the command of Coffee, left at 3 a.m. to cross the Tallapoosa River and cut off the Red Sticks' retreat and prevent reinforcements. Coffee's brigade was made up of 700 mounted infantry and 600 allied Indians. Meanwhile Jackson marched to the breastworks. He had one six-pound and one three-pound artillery piece that started a bombardment at 10:30 a.m. This lasted till noon when Jackson realized that it was having little effect and decided to storm the fortifications. The first person to scale the fortification was Major Lemuel Montgomery who was promptly shot in the head. The fight for the breastworks was a quick but bloody affair but in the end Jackson's men prevailed. The Red Sticks fell back to their second line of defense, a breastwork of logs and underbrush. The Creeks asked for no quarter as their prophets were saying that it would be worse if they were captured. Jackson offered them a chance to surrender and instead the Creeks fired on the party offering it. The fighting lasted until sunset.

During the battle atrocities took place. In one instance a five-year-old boy was killed with the butt of a musket because "someday the boy would be a warrior." Another person killed an Indian who was just sitting down because he wanted to brag about it. After the fighting was over some soldiers started to cut skin from Indians to make bridle reins. In the end only thirty-two Americans were killed, and ninety-nine were injured. In contrast only twenty Red Sticks were able to escape, including their leader Menewa.

Some of the notable people combatants included Sam Houston, John Coffee, and Andrew Jackson.

== Aftermath ==
The massacre had significant short-term and long-term effects. Alarmed by the fall of the fort and understanding little of internal Creek tensions, settlers demanded government protection from the Creek. With federal forces otherwise engaged in the War of 1812, Georgia, Tennessee, and the Mississippi Territory raised state militias for defense and engaged Native American allies, such as the Cherokee, traditional enemy of the Creek. Historian Frank L. Owsley, Jr. suggests that the state-sponsored military activity in the area likely prevented the British from occupying an undefended Gulf Coast in 1814. General Andrew Jackson commanded the state militias to campaign against the Red Sticks. The U.S. forces finally defeated the Creek at the Battle of Horseshoe Bend (1814) on March 27, 1814. His forces killed or captured most of the Creek, but some survivors escaped to Florida, where they joined the Seminoles and continued the resistance to the United States.

The war had begun over internal divisions among Creek who resisted the assimilation and loss of traditions, led by the chiefs William Weatherford, Menawa, and Peter McQueen of the Upper Towns. The war heightened the hostility between the Creek and the Americans in the Southeast, at a time when Americans had steadily encroached on Creek and other Native American tribes' territories, forcing land cessions under numerous treaties but always demanding more. After the war, the Creek were forced to cede half their remaining lands to the U.S.

Within twenty years, they lost the remainder of their lands as a result of the Indian Removal Act, and the forced removal to Indian Territory west of the Mississippi River. Some remnant Creek chose to stay in Alabama and Mississippi and become state and U.S. citizens, but treaty provisions to secure their land were not followed, and many became landless. Some Creek migrated to Florida, where they joined the Seminoles.

== Memorial ==
The stockade and fort have been reconstructed at the historic site. The state installed a historic plaque at the Fort Mims site that notes the British had provided weapons to the Red Sticks as part of its campaign against Captain Kaleb Johnson's troops in the South during the War of 1812.

== Bibliography ==
- Waselkov, Gregory A. (2009). A Conquering Spirit: Fort Mims and the Redstick War of 1813–1814. Tuscaloosa: University of Alabama Press. ISBN 978-0817355739.
