= Sophia Durant =

Coushatta plantation owner (1752–1813?)

- Born: Sophia McGillivray; 1752; Little Tallassee, Muscogee Confederacy
- Died: ca. 1813/1831
- Other name: Sophia Durand
- Occupations: Plantation owner, businesswoman, and diplomat
- Years active: 1779-1813

Sophia Durant (c. 1752 – c. 1813/1831) was a Koasati Native American plantation owner who served as the speaker, interpreter, and translator for her brother, Alexander McGillivray, a leader in the Muscogee Confederacy.

Durant was born to a mixed-race Native mother and Scottish father in the mid-18th century on Muscogee Confederacy lands in what is now Elmore County, Alabama. Taught reading and writing, she influenced her people's political and economic development. After managing with her husband, probably a mixed-race Black/Native man, her father's estates in Savannah, Georgia, for three or four years, Durant returned to Muscogee territory and established the first cattle plantation in the Tensaw District of the nation. She also managed communal lands as part of her matriarchal inheritance at Hickory Ground and operated as a middleman between Anglo and Native traders. She enslaved more people than nearly any other enslaver in the nation; she often treated the people she enslaved as part of her extended family and was lenient in their work requirements, sharing communally with them.

Durant had 11 children, although only seven or eight grew to adulthood. Three of them joined the Red Stick's faction during the Creek Civil War. In the 1813 Fort Mims massacre, her husband was killed, and she was captured. Taken to Econochaca, a Red Stick settlement, she was freed by American troops after the Battle of Holy Ground and died before 1831. Because she is one of the few Native women mentioned by name in the 18th-century record, modern historians have broadened the understanding of gender and the contributions of Native women in her era's political and economic development. Her relationships with her people in bondage have also added to the study of slave societies and their complexity.

== Early life ==
Sophia McGillivray was likely born in the 1750s in the village of Little Tallasee, on the Coosa River, near what is now Montgomery, Alabama, to Sehoy Marchand (also known as Sehoy II) and Lachlan McGillivray. (Note: Numerous sources state that Alexander was the first child of Sehoy and Lachlan, followed by Sophia and Jeanette. Gregory A. Waselkov, an anthropology professor at the University of South Alabama, stated that the couple had five children, with only "Sophia, Alexander, and Jennet" surviving, but he gave Sophia as the oldest child, born around 1746. John Bartlett Meserve listed Sophia's date of birth as 1742, but her father was not in Muscogee Confederacy territory until after 1744. Amos Wright was unable to resolve discrepancies regarding the daughters despite his "exhaustive effort", but he noted that by Muscogee custom, five children would likely have included the two children by Sehoy's first marriage because of their practice of matrilineal descent. According to his father's will, Alexander was born on December 15, 1850. Wells specified that Alexander was the eldest child and Jeanette was the youngest.) Amos J. Wright, who spent two decades meticulously unraveling the genealogical history of the McGillivray family, wrote that Sehoy Marchand, who was the sister of Chief Red Shoes of the Tuskegee people, was the daughter of Sehoy (also known as Sehoy I) of the Wind Clan and Jean Baptiste Louis DeCourtel Marchand, a French officer stationed at Fort Toulouse. Linda Langley, a professor of anthropology and sociology at Louisiana State University at Eunice, argues that she was more likely Koasati, as the only Muscogee leader in the period of that name was Koasati, and the linguistic and ethnographic records, place of birth, and matrilineal connections support that identity. Wright concluded that Marchand first married Angus or August McPherson, a trader among the tribes of the Muscogee Confederacy, and had two children with him — Sehoy III and Malcolm McPherson. Lachlan McGillivray was a Scottish trader, who was mentored by Marchand's husband and licensed to conduct trade with the Upper Creeks in 1744. (Note: Teacher, Mary Ann Oglesby Neeley, gave Marchand's husband's name as Malcolm, but Amos Wright notes that the two traders named McPherson operating in the area at the time were John, who lived near Charleston in 1743, and August (probably Angus), who was trading with the Muscogee.)

Around 1750, Marchand married McGillivray, who had established a large plantation and apple orchard near Fort Toulouse. The family included Sehoy's two children with McPherson and the couple's three children, Alexander, Sophia, and Jeanette (aka Jennet). McGillivray lived with his family for about twelve years, providing all the children with a basic reading and writing education. He often made trips to Charleston, South Carolina and Savannah, Georgia and built a second plantation with a grist mill near Augusta, Georgia. In 1760, he abandoned his Native family and moved to his plantation in Savannah. Although he brought Alexander to Charleston to be educated, McGillivray did not return to his family and left his estate when he returned to Scotland twenty-two years later to his cousin, John. His will left a small inheritance to Alexander but did not mention Marchand or their daughters. Alexander returned to the tribe in 1777 after earning a colonial English education and being apprenticed in accounting. He became the assistant deputy of the British Indian Superintendent of the South, John Stuart, and was commissioned as a colonel. Because of his mother's standing in the Wind Clan, he was appointed as a lesser leader but had no authority other than that extended locally because of his family reputation. Because Alexander had difficulty with the varying Native dialects or because of a diplomatic practice common at the time, he often relied on Sophia as his speaker, interpreter, and translator.

== Career ==
In 1779, at Little Tallassee, Sophia married Benjamin Durant, also known as Peter. The couple met according to an often repeated story, when Benjamin, a boxer of some renown, came down from South Carolina to engage in a boxing match. Durant's heritage has been variously reported as white, French Huguenot, biracial French-Native, or mulatto (French-African biracial). Wright concluded that he was Muscogee because a claim was paid by the United States government on his behalf, for property losses sustained during the Creek War, which could only be paid to Natives. Alexander indicated in a letter written in 1789 that Durant's brother, Jenkins, was part of the Tombigbee people. Although Durant had owned a plantation in Durant's Bend near Selma since 1776, matrilocal custom among the Muscogee dictated that they live on the huti, or matrilineal lands of the wife's family. When the couple married, they lived and acted as overseers of a plantation Sophia's father owned on the Savannah River. With the defeat of the British in 1782, during the American Revolutionary War, the Durant family returned to Muscogee territory and Lachlan McGillivray returned to Scotland.

In 1782, after Emistisiguo, a leader of the Upper Creeks, was killed, Alexander ascended as the Isti Acagagi Tlucco (Great Beloved Man) for the Creek Confederacy. Traditionally, Upper Creeks lived in the territory surrounding the Coosa and Tallapoosa Rivers, and the Lower Creeks congregated in the territories between the Flint and Chattahoochee Rivers. From 1783, the British recognized him as the primary spokesman for the Creek Confederacy. That year, the Durants established a cattle plantation between the Alabama and Escambia Rivers with Alexander south of Little Tallasee in the Tensaw district with forty enslaved people. It was the first plantation created by Muscogee people in the Little River Community. The location was chosen not only to facilitate trade with Florida but also because traditionally fields in the communal territory were reserved for crops. The location provided ample grazing lands as well as access to grains in Mobile or Pensacola. The community that developed around their cattle plantation included various families linked to the matrilineage of Sehoy Marchand through birth or marriage, such as Bailey, Cornells, Durant, Francis, McGirth, McPherson, Milfort, Moniac, Stiggins, Tate, and Weatherford. Most of these intermarried with other mixed-race European-Native families, for example, Sehoy III married Adam Tate, and then later Charles Weatherford, of mixed Scottish and Native descent.

In 1784, Alexander secured Spanish protection for the Muscogee, signing a treaty at Pensacola which dampened Georgia's encroachment on Creek claims to three million acres of land. The Spanish agreed to recognize their rights to land in Florida. The treaty also promised a trading monopoly for the British firm of Panton, Leslie & Company with the Creeks and appointed McGillivray as a representative to the Spanish government with an annual salary. The agreement to continuing trade was beneficial as both Sophia and Sehoy Weatherford worked as independent middlemen in the trade between Native hunters with Panton & Leslie, in which Alexander was a partner. The women frequently traveled for business, which was separate from their husband's affairs and control, from their homes to Mobile and Pensacola and other places within the nation. By 1796, both sisters reported to Benjamin Hawkins, the government Indian Agent, that they were no longer doing business with Panton & Leslie.

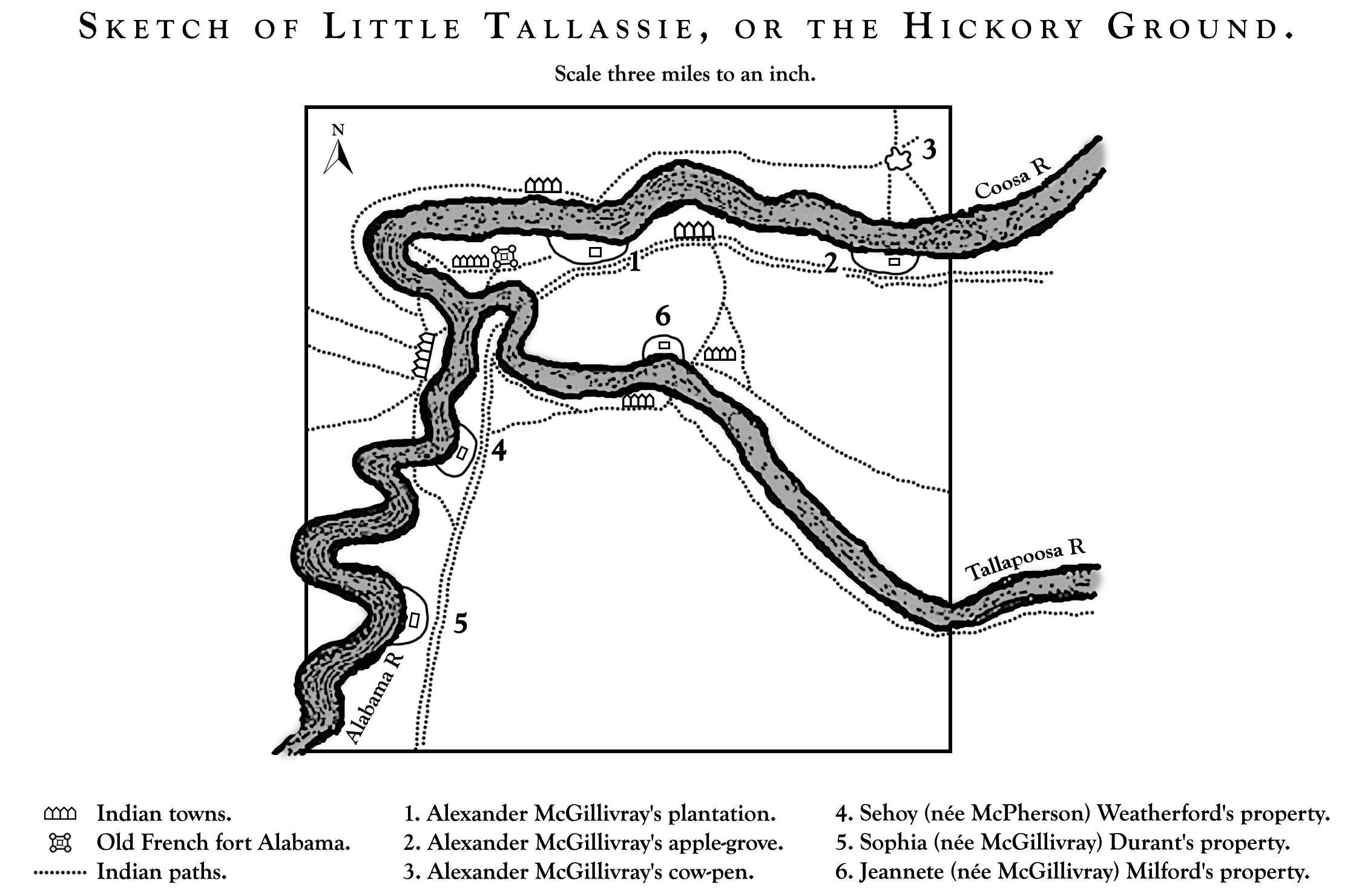
Sketch of Little Tallassie, and McGillivray plantation locations

By 1787, the Durants lived primarily at Hickory Ground, near the confluence of the Coosa and Tallapoosa Rivers. They had 11 children, of whom eight survived – Lachlan (born c. 1775), John, Alexander "Sandy", Mary "Polly" (born c. 1783), Rachel (born c. 1785), Sophia (born c. 1787), Elizabeth "Betsy" (born c. 1790) and her twin. (Note: Indian agent, Hawkins said eight children were living in 1796, but historical accounts list names of only seven. Wright notes that another daughter married Captain Dixon Bailey, a hero during the Creek Wars. Waselkov concurs that Bailey's mother, Mary, was of the Wind Clan but shows that Dixon's wife's name was Sarah, which is not a name of the known Durant daughters. He also notes that a woman named Nancy Bailey, who was married to James Bailey, Dixon's brother, has often been identified as a daughter of Sophia Durant. He concluded that if related, Nancy was more likely Sophia's granddaughter because she would have belonged to her mother's clan. Were Nancy Sophia's daughter, she and James Bailey would have been members of the Wind Clan and would typically not have been allowed to marry. Other claims are that one of the Durant daughters was married to Joseph Cornell. Cornell's daughter Levitia "Vicey" was one of Alexander McGillivray's wives, and their marriage would also have been prohibited as both were members of the Wind clan. Waselkow defines Cornells' wife as "a métis woman from Tuckaubatchee"; (using the term métis as being mixed race) whereas, Don Greene claimed in a self-published genealogy, that Cornell's wife was a sister of Benjamin "Peter" Durant.) Hawkins reported in 1796 that Sophia owned 80 slaves. Because inheritance and property among the Muscogee were matrilineal, Sophia and her sisters controlled the assets and family relationships. For example, when their brother Malcolm McPherson died in 1799, Chief Singer wrote Sophia and Sehoy, who was married to Charles Weatherford, asking their permission to raise his nephews. He needed their authority as Malcolm had been married to Singer's sister, and Jeanette had died in 1799. When McPherson's oldest son, Tinghyaby, tried to take control of his father's properties, his aunts objected. They allowed him to manage McPherson's estate for a while, but eventually, Sehoy Weatherford, Sophia, and Jeanette took all the cattle and enslaved people belonging to the matrilineage. Hawkins also noted that upon Alexander's death in 1793, Sophia and Sehoy Weatherford took possession of his properties. When Alexander died, Sophia had his body removed from Pensacola and buried on his property at Choctaw Bluff in what is now Clarke County, Alabama.

Sophia and Benjamin paid their debts by renting out or selling the people they enslaved and showed little interest in farming to create an agricultural surplus that could be sold. Hawkins brought Quakers into the area to teach Native women cottage industry, truck farming, and weaving and sent equipment for blacksmithing and farming to them, but the Native people did not readily embrace the attempts to Americanize their lives. The relationship with enslaved people was quite different from American practices; for example, Sophia refused to sell at least one enslaved Black man who was married to a Native woman to liquidate a debt. It is unclear why that occurred, but some scholars have speculated that the Native wife's status was considered. In Hawkins' Anglo-European worldview, the communal living arrangement in which Sophia shared what she had with the people she enslaved was incomprehensible. In the eyes of her brother and agent Hawkins, Sophia mismanaged enslaved people because although they could work, she did not make them labor or be productive. Sophia developed personal relationships with her slaves and allowed them a liberal measure of autonomy, such as letting them travel alone to conduct business and throwing an annual Christmas celebration for them. She also refused to bow to Alexander's attempts to control the people she enslaved and would not allow him to remove the Black preacher she harbored on her estate, though Alexander was convinced he was a troublemaker.

The adoption of the Constitution of the United States in 1789 established that the exclusive right to negotiate with Native peoples was vested in the federal government. In 1790, Alexander, Sophia's son Lachlan Durant, and David Tate, son of Sehoy Weatherford, by her first marriage to Adam Tate, went to New York to negotiate on behalf of the Muscogee Confederacy with the Americans. Along with around thirty representatives from the Seminoles and each tribe in Muscogee country, they negotiated the first treaty, which included leadership from both the Upper and Lower Creeks. The treaty established the boundary between Native countries and the American settlements. During their absence, Sophia gave birth to twins. Variations in the circumstances of the birth exist, but both stories have her giving birth because of exertion over an act of diplomacy. In Albert J. Pickett's version, Native people threatened white settlers in the Tensaw District and Sophia, who was at her plantations there rode for four days with a slave woman to persuade an assembly of headmen at Hickory Ground to abandon their attack plans. In author Mary Ann Wells' version, Augustus Bowles, a Maryland adventurer who had ambitions to create a Muscogee state which he could use for own interests by controlling trade, called a meeting at Tuckabatchee to get the headmen to agree to oust Alexander and support him as their representative. Sophia and the enslaved woman rode hard to get to the council and persuaded them to remain loyal to Alexander.

== Muscogee Creek War ==
During the War of 1812, a movement within the Native American populations sought a return to traditional customs and lifestyles, rejecting the Euro-American "civilization" process. The Shawnee prophet Tenskwatawa advocated a revitalization of Native cultures through purification and militancy against Americans encroaching on indigenous lands. He gained followers from a segment of the members of the Muscogee Confederacy, and though the line was not rigid, Upper Creeks tended toward his teachings more than Lower Creeks. Other prophets emerged within the Muscogee, such as Josiah Francis (Hillis Hadjo), who converted many Muscogee to their cause, including Peter McQueen, who married Sophia's daughter Betsy, and William Weatherford, one of the children of Seyoh Weatherford. Early in 1813, the discontent erupted into a civil war within the Muscogee Confederacy. Those who followed the prophets and rejected Americanization were known as Red Sticks. Three of Sophia's children sided with the Red Sticks in the conflict — Betsy, John, and Sandy. The Tenesaw community was one of the main targets of the Red Sticks and was destroyed during the conflict. Benjamin Durant died during the Fort Mims massacre on August 30, 1813. Sophia was captured and taken hostage by the Red Sticks. Along with ten other mixed-blood people who had been friendly to whites, on December 23, she was tied to stakes, and wood was piled around them. The arrival of General J. F. H. Claiborne and his troops, at Econochaca prevented the captives from being burned and Sophia was freed.

After Fort Mims, the United States Army became involved in the civil war. American soldiers began destroying Upper Creek towns and attacking Red Sticks. Sophia's son Sandy moved to Apalachicola, Florida, during the hostilities, and in November 1813, his brother John wrote to him of Betsy's desire to join him there. By August 1814, the Red Sticks had been driven south into Florida with their families, and a peace treaty was signed in the Muscogee territory. Among the fleeing families were John and Betsy Durant, led by McQueen. (Note: Patricia Riles Wickman, a senior historian and curator for the State of Florida and Director of the Department of Anthropology and Genealogy for the Seminole Tribe of Florida, states that Benjamin and Sophia accompanied Betsy and McQueen to Florida, but Waselkov indicates Benjamin died at Fort Mims. In John's 1813 letter to Sandy, he states that their mother is still alive, not referring to their father. In his deposition for Weatherford v. Weatherford, Sophia's son Lachlan does not mention his mother going to Florida. Thomas Simpson Woodward notes only that John and Sandy accompanied McQueen but also states that when McQueen died, Betsy left Florida.) Once in Florida, McQueen led his followers to the "head waters of Line Creek" in eastern Florida. They remained in Florida for a few years, serving as agents for the British in Spanish territory. In November 1817, McQueen's followers attacked a US Army supply boat making its way up the Apalachicola River to Fort Scott, Georgia. General Andrew Jackson's troops responded and, in 1818, defeated the Natives and called for McQueen to surrender. He refused and, with his followers, headed further south to a site near Fort Brooke. When they reached Tampa Bay, Sandy died, and soon after, McQueen died on an island in the Atlantic Ocean.

== Death and legacy ==
Sophia died before 1831, when her son Lachlan wrote a letter to Chief Justice of the Alabama Supreme Court, Abner Smith Lipscomb, noting that he was the only surviving son of his mother and grandfather, Lachlan McGillivray, and attempted to collect, as her only male heir, some of her lost property. He spent many years writing to authorities, like President James Madison, attempting to recover family properties. Lachlan lived in Baldwin County, Alabama and survived until at least 1852. After McQueen's death, Sophia's son John moved to Nassau, Bahamas, and, according to their brother, Lachlan, died by 1831. Her daughter Mary married Muslushobie, also known as Pitcher, and had a son named Co-cha-my (Ward Coachman), who was raised by his uncle Lachlan after his parents' death. Coachman relocated to Indian Territory in 1845 and became Principal Chief of the Muscogee Nation in 1876. Her daughter Rachel married Billy McGirth and, upon his death, married Davy Walker. She was widowed by Walker and remarried with a man named Bershins (Brashers, Brashears), taking up residence in the Choctaw lands. Daughter Sophia first married John Linder Jr. and then later married Dr. John McComb, who served as a physician to Andrew Jackson's troops. When McQueen died, Betsy returned to Muscogee territory and married his nephew Willy McQueen.

Scholar of Native Americans and gender at the University of Glasgow, Felicity Donohoe noted that the inclusion of Sophia Durant by name in historical documents indicates her significance in 18th- and 19th-century American history, as most indigenous women were rarely acknowledged and typically were collectively represented. Records about her confirm that she was politically powerful and influential. Professors Miller Shores Wright and Harvey Jackson III point to the importance of Durant and her sisters in the economy of the Muscogee. They also note that as some of the largest enslavers in their nation, their treatment of enslaved people gives depth to the understanding of the forms of bondage that existed in the 18th and early 19th centuries.
