= Lachlan McGillivray =

Lachlan McGillivray (c. 1718–1799) was a prosperous fur trader and planter in colonial Georgia with interests that extended from Savannah to what is now central Alabama. He was the father of Alexander McGillivray and the great-uncle of William McIntosh and William Weatherford, three of the most powerful and historically important Native American chiefs among the Creek of the Southeast.

== Early life ==
McGillivray was born in Dunmaglass, Inverness, Scotland. Details of his early life are sketchy; he left no account and his biographers often romanticized his tale. They claimed that he was fleeing the Highland rebellion of 1745 and that he arrived penniless in a strange land, though probably neither of these is true. He was born into the McGillivray (or M'Gillivray, as he himself wrote the name) family of the Clan Chattan, a large Scottish clan traditionally led by members of the MacGillivray clan McIntosh family.

More probable is that he emigrated in the late 1730s to either Charleston, South Carolina, or Augusta, Georgia, where members of his family had been engaging in the Indian trade for a generation. He may have arrived as an indentured servant to his relative Farquhar McGillivray, a merchant with interests along the southern Atlantic seaboard. Records attest that Farquhar McGillivray employed indentured servants, and it was not uncommon for such arrangements to be made between relatives.

Brother to Lachlan and uncle to Alexander McGillivray, Captain Alexander McGillivray (d.1763) regularly transported cargos between Charleston and the West Indies. His will probated in 1764 included a bequest to "brother Lachlan McGillivray, a mourning suit of clothes and a mourning ring."

== Colonist in North America ==
Lachlan McGillivray was one of several Scottish Highlanders recruited by James Oglethorpe to act as settler-soldiers protecting the frontiers of Georgia from the Spanish in Florida, the French in the Alabama basin, and the Indian allies of the Spanish and the French. On January 10, 1736, Lachlan and 176 emigrants, including women and children, arrived on board the Prince of Wales to establish the town of Darien, Georgia, originally known as New Inverness. The town was founded in January 1736 and named after the Darien scheme, a former Scottish colony in Panama.

By the mid-1740s, McGillivray was well established as a trader in the Upper Creek nation in what is now central Alabama. He established a fur trading post and plantation at Little Tallassee (also spelled Talisi in some documents) near today's Wetumpka, Alabama, possibly on the site of the former Fort Toulouse. He prospered and invested his trading and plantation profits in businesses on the Atlantic coasts of Georgia, eventually settling in Savannah, Georgia, as a man of considerable wealth. In a will drafted in 1767, long before his death, he planned the disposition of a 281-acre (1.14 km^{2}) plantation on Hutchinson Island, Georgia, a 1,000-acre (4 km^{2}) plantation known as Vale Royal upriver from Savannah, and cash bequests totaling more than £2,500, implying that he was in possession of that amount of currency, as well as numerous bequests of slaves and other valuable chattel.

McGillivray was an accomplished Indian trader and Adair praised his skill in negotiating with the Creek to stay neutral during the French and Indian Wars (1760-1761).

== Marriage and family ==
Though there is no record of McGillivray having married in the Scottish Presbyterian tradition, he took as a consort a high-status Creek woman named Sehoy Marchand. Their marriage was recognized by the Creek. Early biographers claimed Sehoy Marchand was the daughter of a French officer at Fort Toulouse named Jean-Baptiste Marchand. Her mother was also named Sehoy, and she was a high-status woman of the Koasati (alternative spelling: Coushatta), of the Wind Clan. Hers was a politically powerful family of the Upper Creek nation, which had matrilineal system of descent and property. Sehoy's immediate family included several important chiefs. The marriage was a strategic alliance for her family as well as for the ambitious trader; she could protect her children within the tribe.

Albert Pickett and other biographers portrayed Sehoy as a beautiful black-eyed Indian princess, with whom McGillivray was instantly lovestruck. Historical and circumstantial evidence suggest the marriage may have been strategic for both sides, as he gained by being allied with a high-status family of Creek, and Sehoy and her family had benefits from a connected European-American trader. They had three children: Alexander, Sophia and Jean (also spelled Jeanne) McGillivray (the latter named after Lachlan's sister). The children lived most of the time with their mother in the Creek tribe and learned its language and ways, although the father sent Alexander to a European-American school in Charleston and Augusta.

Many Native American chiefs supported such alliances; European traders, who were men of capital, also sought the alliances of marriage into tribes to strengthen their relationships. Though the Creek tribes treated marriage as a serious institution and had strong taboos against infidelity (especially by women), divorce was permissible and easily achieved. A husband could divorce a wife by leaving her house, and a wife her husband by leaving his possessions outside of her door. To the matrilineal Creek tribe, the house always belonged to the wife; it was usually shared with her female relatives and their husbands. The Creek considered the mother's children as wholly Creek, regardless of partial European ancestry, due to the matrilineal kinship system of the Muscogee.

After the late 1750s, Sehoy married at least two other men (monagamously), with whom she bore at least two additional children, before McGillivray relocated to Savannah. McGillivray made neither provision nor mention of Sehoy in his 1767 will. She was the custodial parent of their son, Alexander McGillivray, whom he did acknowledge and provide for. The younger McGillivray became a prominent Creek chief and planter, and a slaveholder like his father.

Though McGillivray made neither mention nor provision for his daughters in his will, their accounts attest to a relationship with him, as they visited him in Savannah, and Sophia named her oldest son, Lachlan McGillivray Durant, for him. McGillivray's will and other surviving writings frequently noted Alexander, referred to as his "natural son," a euphemism for illegitimate.

McGillivray, a patrilineal member of the Clan Chattan, may well have fought a kind of custody battle with his son's mother. As a member of the matrilineal Creeks, she considered her son and daughters as members of her own Wind Clan. As was traditional, Alexander was reared with his maternal uncle Red Shoes, who by varying accounts was either brother or uncle to his mother Sehoy. The role of maternal uncles in the upbringing of a male child was far more important to the Creek than that of the father, as they were of the same clan. The biological father belonged to a different clan. The uncle would mentor the boy through introduction to men's roles and societies.

McGillivray took an interest in Alexander, for he arranged and paid (at considerable expense) for the boy's education at Presbyterian academies in Charleston and Augusta. The father also arranged for the youth's apprenticeship in at least one mercantile house. He bequeathed him the substantial sum of £1,000 and made other bequests in his will. He bequeathed his most valuable assets, his plantations outside Savannah, to the "lawfully begotten" children of his Scottish siblings and cousins.

== Loyalist and American Revolution ==
Lachlan McGillivray returned to Scotland for lengthy visits prior to the American Revolution, but appeared to have identified as a citizen of North America, the source and location of his considerable fortune. He took an active role in Savannah's administration, where his knowledge of Creek leaders and their languages/cultures were useful for negotiations of treaties between the tribes and the city.

In the Scottish insurrections of the early 18th century, his Clan Chattan had mostly sided with the cause of James the Old Pretender and Bonnie Prince Charlie. In Savannah, McGillivray had signed petitions opposing certain Crown colonial policies (particularly parliamentary taxation). But he also had many business interests with British merchants and, at the outset of the American Revolution, he was a Loyalist. As the war progressed, he and other Loyalists in Savannah earned enemies among the Patriot factions and the Continental Army. Continental soldiers arrested McGillivray and at least two of his McIntosh cousins as suspected spies. They were freed when the British captured the city, and briefly fled west of Savannah after the British evacuation at the end of the war. Following the 1783 Treaty of Paris, the new US government confiscated and sold the property of many Loyalists: McGillivray lost his lands, slaves, and much of his other property. He and several of his Loyalist relatives and friends liquidated whatever property they still possessed, and left for Scotland with whatever monies they could take out, returning to the McGillivray clan's estates in Dunmaglass, Scotland.

== Death and legacy ==
In Scotland, McGillivray served as an advisor and guardian for the orphaned head of the Clan Chattan. He continued correspondence with his son Alexander and other friends and relatives in the United States. After his son's death in 1793, McGillivray paid for Alexander's orphaned children, Alleck and Mary (their mother had also died), to be brought to Scotland. He arranged for their education. Although not returning personally to the US, McGillivray took a role in the settling of his son's complicated estate. It was difficult for attorneys to ascertain what parts of McGillivray's lands belonged to him personally and which to the Creek tribe. Some of his assets in cattle and slaves had to be sold to pay off his many debts. Further complicating matters from a Scottish view, the younger McGillivray was a polygamist in the Creek tradition of successful men. He had other wives, who were also of mixed Creek and European ancestry.

Lachlan McGillivray died in his native Scotland in 1799 at around 80 years of age. Neither his will nor his place of interment are known. Alleck and Mary McGillivray were still living with him in Scotland at that time. Alleck died as a young adult shortly after his grandfather. Mary McGillivray's life has not been traced.

=== Marriage and issue ===
Lachlan married Sehoy Marchand, member of the Wind Clan of the Creek, a daughter of Jean Marchand and Sehoy

They had the following:

- Alexander McGillivray, became the leader of the Creeks as they attempted to prevent overrunning of Creek territory covering most of Middle and Southern Alabama and Georgia, as European settlers pushed inland from the Eastern seaboard.
- Jean McGillivray, who married French officer Le Clerc Milfort, later of service in the Napoleonic army and famed as a memoirist.
- Sophia McGillivray who married Benjamin Durant and was mother to a large family and may have died at the Fort Mims massacre in which her nephew Red Eagle was involved.
- John Jack "White Cloud' Ward, III - adopted son who later married Nahoga ("Nancy") Mahala Moniac. John Ward was Red Eagle's War General and Indian Interpreter. Buried at Fort Mitchell in 1813

Sehoy Marchand married again after McGillivray. She had a daughter, Sehoy III. Sehoy III married a man named Weatherford, and one of their sons was William Weatherford, better known to history by his Creek name, translated as Red Eagle.
