= Sehoy =

Native American matriarch

Matriarch Sehoy
- Died: Circa 1730
- Other names: Sehoy I
- Citizenship: Muscogee Confederacy
- Children: Sehoy Marchand, Red Shoes

Sehoy, or Sehoy I (died ca. 1730), was an 18th-century matriarch of the Muscogee Confederacy and a member of the Wind clan.

She established a dynasty that became influential in the political and economic history of her nation and its relationship with the United States. Because inheritance and property within the confederacy were controlled matrilineally in early Muscogee society, her daughters and their descendants became influential in shaping tribal membership and relations with people they enslaved. In Muscogee culture, tribal affiliation was defined by clan membership and matrilineal descent. If the mother was part of a tribe, her children would also be part of that tribe, regardless of the father's ethnicity or citizenship.

Some of her male descendants shaped policy with the United States through treaty-making and through tribal leadership.

== Biography ==
Sehoy was a Muscogee woman of the Wind clan. Amos J. Wright, who analyzed for over two decades the genealogical history of her family, reported that various historical records note her heritage was through the Tuskegee tribal town, but also there are indications that her son was known as the "Talapuche Chief" (also styled Tallapoosa). Linda Langley, a professor at Louisiana State University at Eunice in anthropology and sociology, argued that she was more likely Koasati. Analyzing Native leaders who bore the name Red Shoes, the origin of persons affiliated with Fort Toulouse (typically, either Koasati or Alabama), the linguistic difficulties in communication between Alabama/Koasati-speakers, and Muscogee-speakers, Langley concluded that she was probably Koasati. Gregory A. Waselkov, a professor of anthropology at the University of South Alabama, noted that her town of origin has been given as both Taskigi, (near Taskigi Mound), or Coosada, Alabama. He concluded that as the Taskigi people did not relocate from the Chattahoochee River to the forks of the Coosa and Tallapoosa Rivers until after 1725, she was likely from Coosada, and thus Koasati.

Sehoy grew up in the area near Fort Toulouse, which the French constructed after the Yamasee War (1715-1716) at the request of Alabama leaders. Jean Baptiste Louis DeCourtel Marchand arrived at the fort in 1717 and became its commander in 1720. There was a mutiny at the fort in 1721, and Marchand called on the warriors at Coosada to assist him in capturing deserters.

Some sources indicate that Sehoy married Marchand in 1722, in a ceremony which might have been conducted under Muscogee as opposed to French law. (Note: Louis LeClerc Milfort, who married Sehoy's granddaughter, Jeanette McGillivray, wrote in his memoirs that his mother-in-law, Sehoy Marchand, was an "illegitimate daughter of a French officer who formerly commanded Fort Toulouse.") Around that time, the couple had a daughter, Sehoy Marchand (also known as Sehoy II), before severing their relationship. Marchand served as commander of the fort until 1723, and was reappointed in 1727, serving until 1729. He remained with the colonial Troupes de la Marine through 1734.

After the relationship with Marchand ended, Sehoy married Red Shoes, a Koasati leader. They had a son also known as Red Shoes and a daughter. Sehoy died around 1730.

== Notable descendants ==
- Sehoy Weatherford (1740s–1811), influential matriarch who impacted the property and inheritance customs among her people and was the mother of William Weatherford.
- Alexander McGillivray (1750–1793) negotiated the first treaty between the United States and the Muscogee Confederacy and although he was a controversial leader, he was known for his negotiations with the American, British, and Spanish authorities to benefit the Muscogee interests, as well as his own.
- Sophia Durant (ca. 1752–between 1813 and 1831), interpreter, translator, and speaker for her brother McGillivray, and was the mother of three of the Red Stick faction during the Muscogee Civil War: John, Alexander "Sandy", and Betsy Durant, who was married to Peter McQueen.
- William Weatherford (1765–1824), Red Stick leader who led the attack on Fort Mims and supervised the Red Stick defense of Econochaca during the Battle of Holy Ground.
- David Moniac (1802–1836), West Point graduate and only Native commissioned officer to serve in the Second Seminole War.
- Ward Coachman (1823–1900), Principal Chief of the Muscogee Nation from 1876 to 1879.
