= Sehoy II =

Native American matriarch (b. c. 1722)

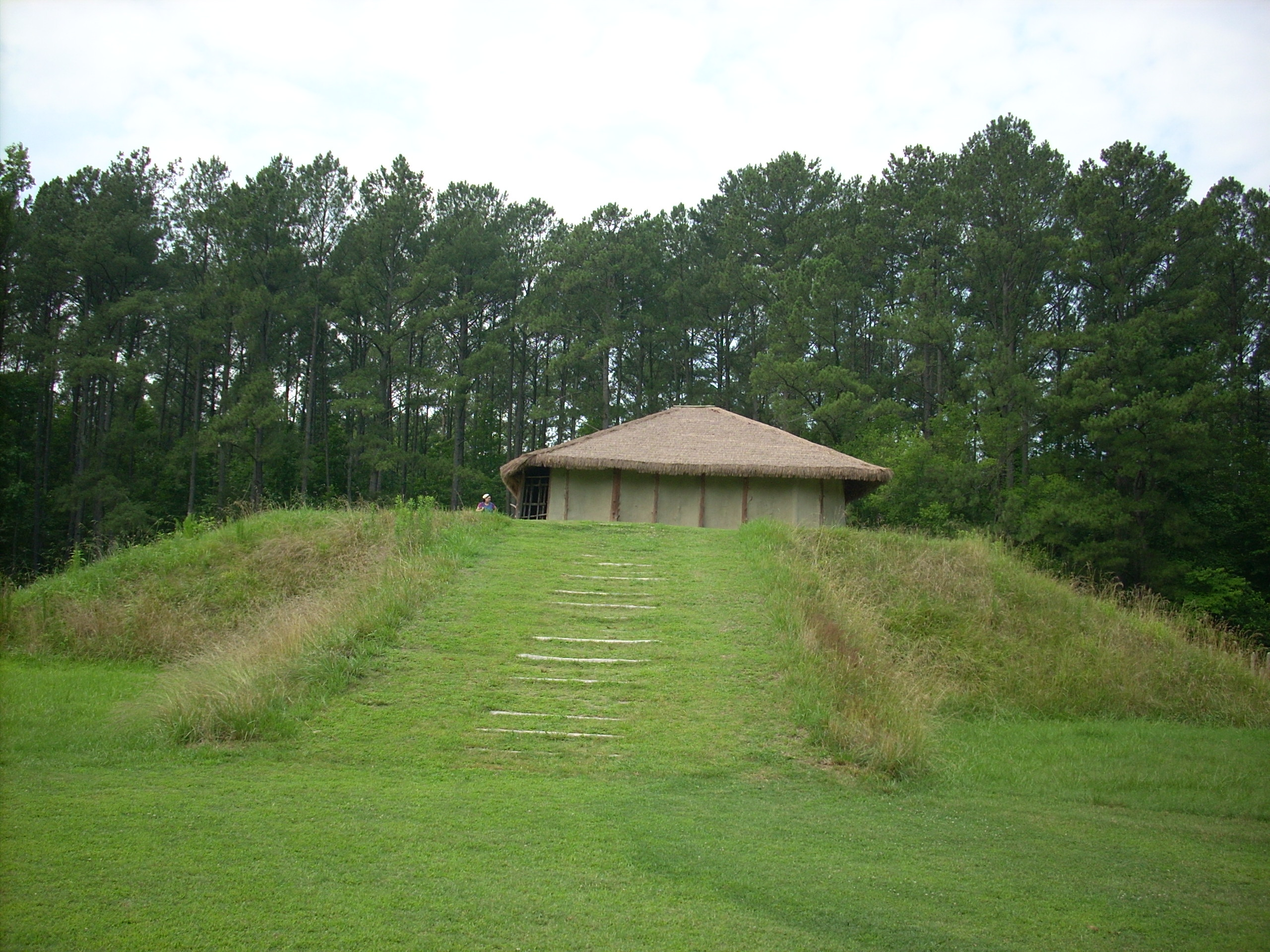
Town Creek Indian Mound is supposedly Sehoy II's burial place.

Sehoy II or Sehoy Marchand (b. c. 1722) was a Muscogee Creek Wind Clan woman who was part of the Sehoy matrilineage. She and her family are known for their intermarriages with white traders, with the children inheriting their tribal identities from the mother's side.

== Family ==
She was born around 1722, the daughter of Sehoy I of the Wind Clan and a French officer, Marchand, who commanded at Fort Toulouse. (Some have argued that she was instead a 'full-blooded' indigenous American.) She was half-sister to Muscogean Chief Red Shoes II through her mother Sehoy's marriage to Red Shoes I.

== Lachlan McGillivray ==
Sehoy married Scottish trader Lachlan McGillivray about 1745. In 1851, Albert J. Pickett wrote that they met at Hickory Ground a few miles from Fort Toulouse, married according to Creek forms, and settled at Little Tallassee. He said, 'The Indian tradition ran that, while pregnant with her first child, she repeatedly dreamed of piles of manuscripts, ink and paper, and heaps of books...', foreshadowing her son Alexander's career.

Lachlan took advantage of Sehoy's influential connections in the Creek nation to extend his commerce. Their children were Alexander McGillivray (b. 1750), Sophia Durant, and Jeannette/Jennet, who married Le Clerc Milfort, as well as two who died in childhood. Lachlan departed the country in 1757.

== Other marriages and children ==
Sehoy II also had other marriages, to Scottish trader Malcolm McPherson and, according to family tradition, to an unnamed chief of the Tawasa or Tuckabatchee. Her children by these marriages were Sehoy III, Elizabeth, and Malcolm McPherson II, who predeceased his sisters so that they inherited his property. Sehoy II's marriage to McPherson is sometimes placed before and sometimes after her marriage to Lachlan.

== Death ==
Sehoy II's death date is unknown, but her daughter Sehoy III's move to live with the Moniac family at the age of eight may suggest that Sehoy II had died by then. She was buried 'on the river bluff there near the Indian Mound in Montgomery.'
