= Red Shoes (Muskogean chief) =

Red Shoes (c. 1720-1783) was a Muskogean leader of the Tuskegee people in the 18th century. He primarily lived in modern Alabama near Tuskegee at the forks of the Alabama River, but his influence extended well into modern Mississippi.

Red Shoes was the son of a Koasati leader also known as Red Shoes and his wife Sehoy. Since lineage among the Muscogee Confederacy was traced matrilineally, Red Shoes, like his mother, was part of the Wind Clan. His parents also had a daughter together, who would have been his full sister. His half-sister, Sehoy Marchand, daughter of Jean Baptiste Louis DeCourtel Marchand was first married to Angus or August McPherson, with whom she had two children, Sehoy McPherson (Sehoy III) and Malcolm McPherson. She later married Lachlan McGillivray and had three more children, Alexander, Sophia, and Jeanette McGillivray.

When his mother died around 1730, Red Shoes' father remarried and had another son who he also named Red Shoes. Alexander McGillivray wrote a letter in 1788, describing the relationship in Creek terms, he called this second son named Red Shoes a "brother to one of my uncles", indicating that they were not of the same matrilineage or clan. Red Shoes died about 1783, as his death was reported by his nephew Alexander in a letter to Governor O'Neill. Written on January 3, 1784, McGillivray stated that his uncle was killed while trying to recover some stolen horses.
