= David Moniac =

American soldier (1802–1836)

- Born: December 25, 1802; Near modern Pintlala, Alabama
- Died: November 21, 1836 (aged 33); Sumter County, Florida
- Burial place: Florida National Cemetery
- Education: United States Military Academy
- Spouse: Mary Powell
- Children: 2
- Military career
- Allegiance: United States
- Branch: United States Army
- Rank: Major
- Unit: 6th Infantry Regiment
- Conflicts: Second Seminole War; Battle of Wahoo Swamp †

David Moniac (December 25, 1802 – November 21, 1836) was a United States Army soldier of Muscogee descent. In 1822 he was the first Native American and first non-white graduate from the United States Military Academy at West Point, New York. He was born into a prominent family of Upper Creek, and was related to major Creek leaders on both sides of his family.

Moniac was the first cadet to enter West Point from the new state of Alabama. Moniac resigned his commission in 1822, the year that he graduated, in order to manage his clan's property in Alabama, where he developed a cotton plantation.

In 1836, during the Second Seminole War in Florida, Moniac was commissioned as a Captain and selected to command a unit of Muscogee mercenaries who were hired to help fight against the Seminole. Most of the officers who commanded the Muscogee mercenaries were White, and he was the only Native American among them.

Moniac was killed by Seminole warriors at the Battle of Wahoo Swamp. In the 1990s, his remains were transferred from a local cemetery to the newly established Florida National Cemetery for military veterans, which was a few miles away.

== Early life and education ==
David A. Moniac, as his name was sometimes recorded, was the son of prosperous merchant Samuel Moniac and Elizabeth Weatherford; both were mixed-race Creek. His mother was the sister of Creek leader William Weatherford, and Alexander McGillivray was an important uncle and Creek chief on his mother's side. The Creek had a matrilineal kinship system, so Moniac was considered to be born into his mother's Wind Clan and gained his social status there. Under this system, his mother's eldest brother would have been more important to the boy's upbringing than his father was.

The Moniac family lived in present-day Montgomery County, Alabama, near the unincorporated community of Pintlala. Samuel Moniac served with the U.S. forces in the Creek War. He was allied with the Lower Creek, who had more ties with whites and were more assimilated. They defeated the Red Sticks, who were traditionalists.

At this time, the United States was encouraging assimilation of the Creek and other tribes of the Southeast to European-American ways. These nations were referred to as the Five Civilized Tribes, for they adopted many aspects of U.S. culture.

The 1790 Treaty of New York and the Fort Jackson Treaty, which concluded the Creek War, included provisions for the education of the Creek people.

Moniac was likely aided by his father's military service in getting an appointment in 1817 to the U.S. Military Academy, located in New York. John Crowell, Alabama's first member of the House of Representatives and after that, US Indian agent to the Creek, supported his appointment. (Many US Indian agents had Native American wives, who helped them deal with language and cultural issues, and to have families in frontier areas.)

Before starting at West Point, Moniac studied with John McLeod, a tutor in Washington, D.C, to prepare for the entrance exam and classes. At his request, he repeated a year of college; he graduated 39 out of 40 in 1822. These 40 had succeeded; their entering class had 117 cadets.

Moniac served for five months as a Brevet Second Lieutenant in the Sixth Infantry, but resigned his commission on December 31, 1822. President Madison was encouraging Army officers to resign, as in 1821, given that the War of 1812 and First Seminole Wars were over, Congress had cut the size of the Army. But West Point was graduating more officers than the Army could use. Moniac returned to Alabama to deal with clan property.

== Return to Alabama ==
Moniac returned to Alabama, where he settled in Baldwin County. He developed a cotton plantation and bred thoroughbred race horses. He married Mary Powell, a Creek who was a cousin of Seminole leader Osceola.

Among their children was a son, David A. Moniac. He served as sheriff of Baldwin County, where many Moniac descendants settled Sheriff Moniac is buried in the Old Methodist Church in Daphne, Alabama. The plantation home, built in the 1830s, stood until burning down in 2019. It was considered one of the oldest houses in Baldwin County. The house site is located on Gantt Road in Little River, Alabama, but only a few brick pillars survive.

== Second Seminole War ==
Map of East Florida (published 1840) showing locations of Dade's Battle and the Battle of Wahoo Swamp

Fourteen years after he graduated from West Point, with the outbreak of the Second Seminole War in 1836, Moniac was called twice into service: he first served with the Alabama militia to suppress an uprising of displaced Creek. Indian removal had started in the Southeast, as tribes were relocated to Indian Territory west of the Mississippi River.

In August 1836, Moniac was commissioned as a captain of the Creek Mounted Volunteer Regiment. It was a volunteer unit of Creek warriors led by white officers on leave from regular units. He was the only Native American officer in the unit. The regiment patrolled and skirmished with the Seminole in Florida along the Withlacoochee River. He was promoted to major in November.

That month, Territorial Governor Richard K. Call took a force of 2500 regular soldiers, Moniac and his Creek volunteers, and Tennessee and Florida militia from Ft. Drane, to the Wahoo Swamp on the Withlacoochee River. They were to find and destroy the stronghold of Seminole Chief Jumper. In what would become known as the Battle of Wahoo Swamp, Call's force attacked an estimated mixed force of 600 Seminole and African-American warriors, who were defending their families. The deep water blocked the American force. Moniac ran ahead into the water to encourage his men to cross. He was shot dead by the Seminoles.

General Call called off the attack after taking fierce fire from the Seminole camp, and being unsure if the water was fordable. The American dead from the battle were buried near those killed the previous December in 1835 at the nearby Dade's Massacre site, where the Seminole defeated U.S. Army forces. Later all the bodies were moved for burial at the St. Augustine National Cemetery.

== Honors ==
- In the 1990s, Major Moniac's remains were transferred and reinterred in the Florida National Cemetery, as a recognition of his military service. The new cemetery was established a few miles from the Wahoo Swamp Battlefield.
