= Joseph Marie Audin-Rouvière =

French doctor

Joseph Marie Audin-Rouviere
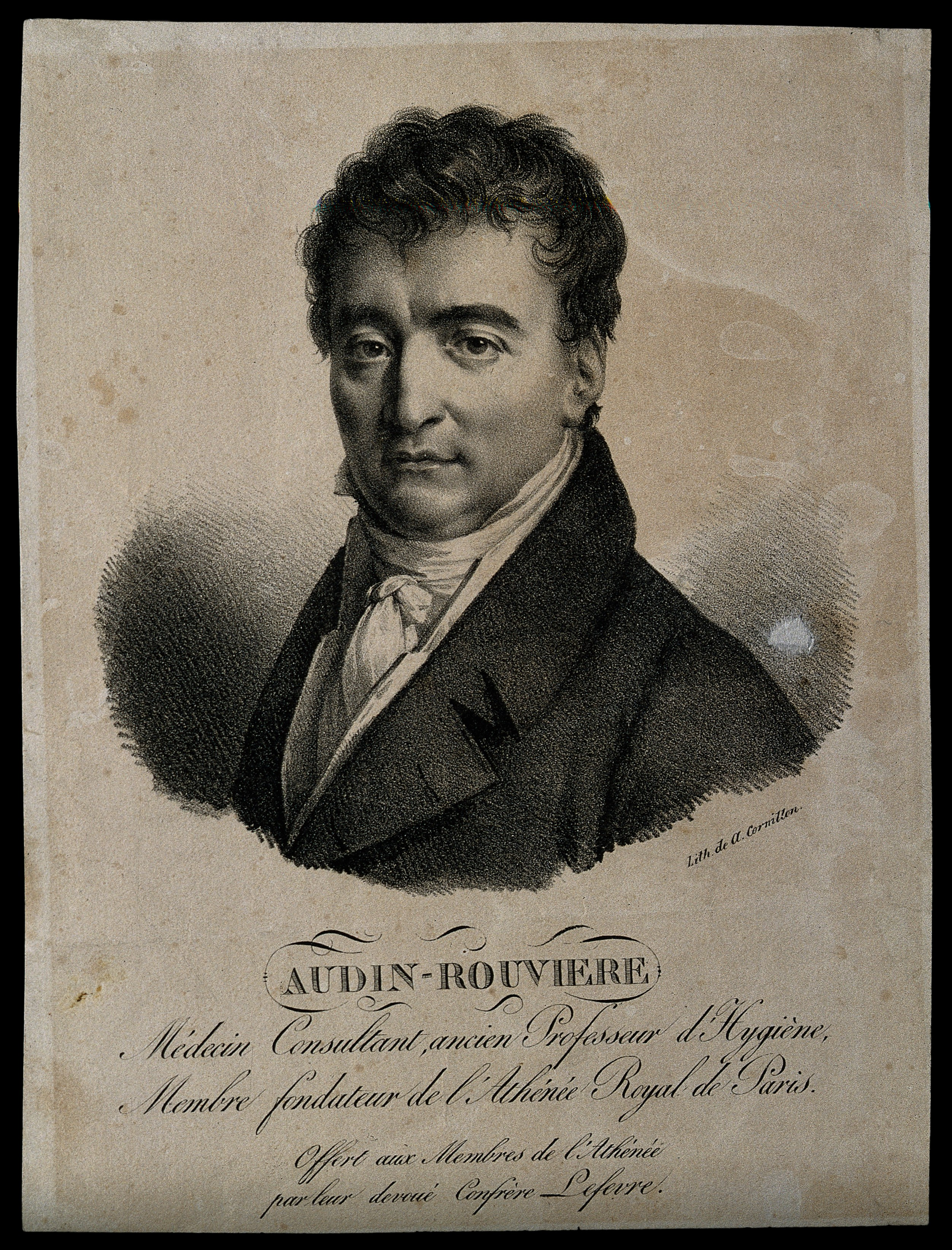
- Born: 26 March 1764
- Died: 23 April 1832 (aged 68)
- Occupation: French doctor

Joseph Marie Audin-Rouvière (born 26 March 1764 in Carpentras; died in Paris on 23 April 1832) was a French medical doctor.

== Biography ==
He published in 1794 "Medicine without the doctor or health manual, a work intended to relieve infirmities, to prevent acute illnesses, to cure chronic illnesses, without the help of a foreign hand ", a work which became popular and obtained a large number of editions. He also amassed a great fortune by selling, under the name of grains of life or grains of health, a secret remedy which he gave as a universal remedy and which is only Johann Peter Frank's tonic- purgative. He was a member of the Masonic lodge "Les Frères Artistes" of the Sacred Order of the Sophisians.

== Notes ==
1. Secret society dedicated to Isis, created in the Parisian lodge of the Artist Brothers by former members of the Egyptian expedition
