= Battle of Wahoo Swamp =

Extended military engagement of the Second Seminole War

- Part of Second Seminole War
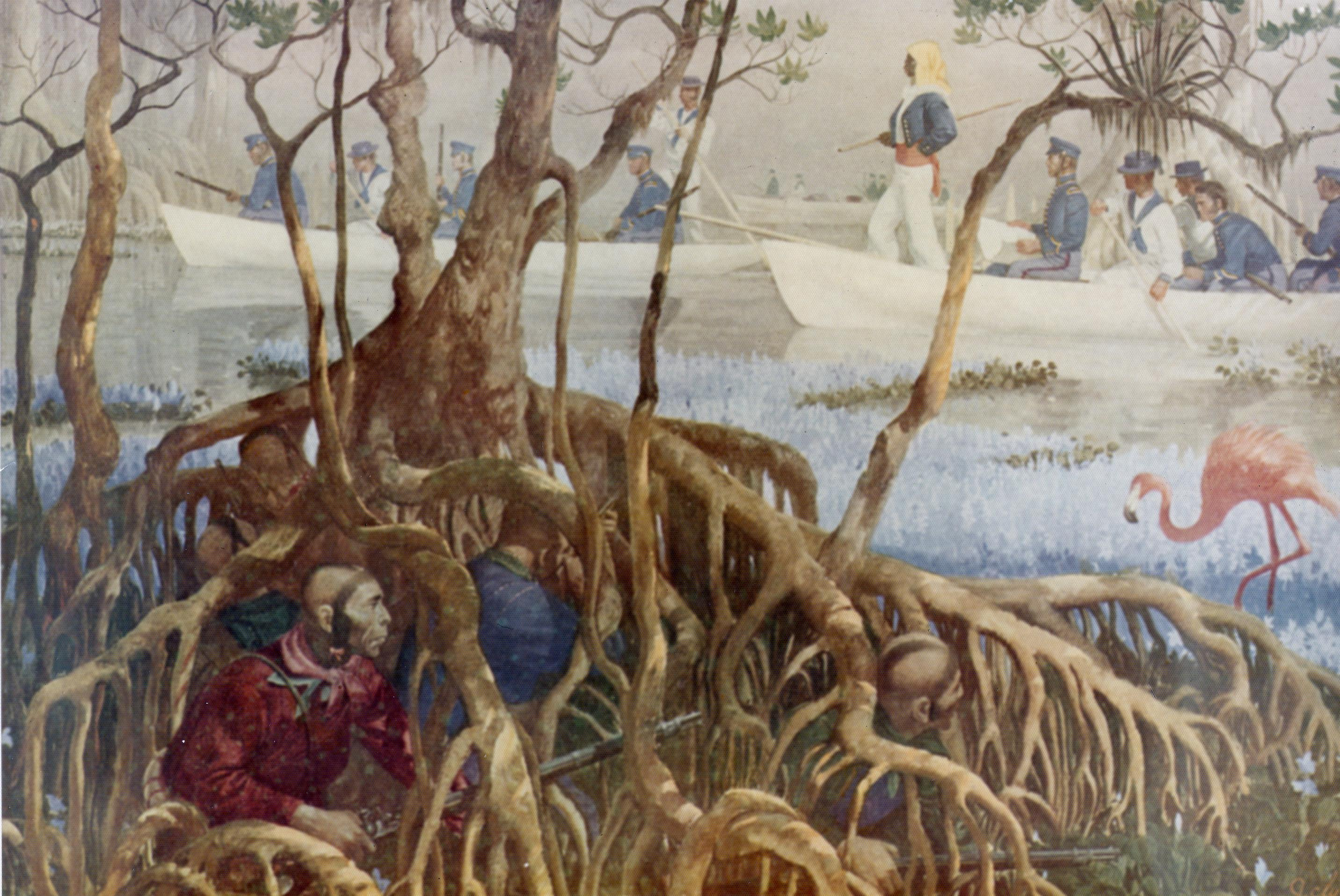
- United States Marines searching for the Indians during the Seminole War.
Date	November 21, 1836
Location	Sumter County, Florida 28°41′23.64″N 82°13′22.26″W
Result	American victory

Belligerents
United States	Seminole

Commanders and leaders
Richard K. Call	Osuchee; Yaholooche

Strength
2,500	Approx. 600

Casualties and losses
12 killed, 34 wounded	35–75

The Battle of Wahoo Swamp was an extended military engagement of the Second Seminole War fought in November 1836 in the Wahoo Swamp, approximately 50 miles northeast of Fort Brooke in Tampa and 35 miles south of Fort King in Ocala in modern Sumter County, Florida. General Richard K. Call, the territorial governor of Florida, led a mixed force consisting of Florida militia, Tennessee volunteers, Creek mercenaries, and some troops of the US Army and Marines against Seminole forces led by chiefs Osuchee and Yaholooche.

Soon after hostilities began in late 1835, a portion of the Seminole and Black Seminole of north and central Florida removed to the Wahoo Swamp – a largely unmapped wilderness of wetlands, dense hardwood hammocks, and scattered wet prairies – as a refuge from attempts to expel them from the territory as demanded by the Indian Removal Act. Settlements were established on patches of dry land along the Withlacoochee River, and the area became a base from which small raiding parties launched attacks on US military forces and plantations between Fort Brooke and Fort King.

In the autumn of 1836, General Call's forces arrived in the area to seek out and destroy Seminole villages and farms along the Withlacoochee to break their resistance. However, though he forced the Seminoles to retreat deeper into the swamp in a series of sharp engagements, he was unable to follow due to difficult terrain and dwindling supplies. American forces had left the Wahoo Swamp by the end of November 1836, and Call was relieved of his command by General Thomas Jesup the following month.

== Background ==
The Second Seminole War between the Government of the United States and the Seminole escalated after the Dade Massacre on December 28, 1835, and the killing by Osceola of the Indian agent Wiley Thompson, who was organizing the removal of the Seminoles from Florida, on the same day. The Seminoles and the Maroons (enslaved Africans who had escaped from their bondage), who lived in their own villages or towns near those of the Seminoles and became known as Black Seminoles, found themselves under constant threat by the US Army and territorial militias, who wanted to relocate the Seminoles and return the refugees to the slaveholders who claimed them.

The Black Seminoles occupied many small villages and plantations along the Withlacoochee River where they raised large crops of corn, pumpkins, squash, beans, and sugar cane during the growing season; the whites were aware that they stored provisions in various hammocks surrounded by the swamps along the river, and in the morass called the "Wahoo Swamp". This large swamp was the stronghold of the Indians, where their cattle and their families were hidden, with many Maroon families residing there as well. Consequently, the white soldiers made it a priority to destroy the villages and seize their supplies; the Seminoles had much to lose and could be expected to make a strong defense.

On November 14, Brig. Gen. Robert Armstrong, who was marching with five hundred mounted men toward these settlements, encountered a well-armed force of Indians and Maroons, and heavy gunfire ensued. Eleven of Armstrong's men fell before the allied barrage in less than an hour. Nevertheless, he managed to drive them from the battlefield, but they recovered their dead and wounded, the possession of which the Indians regarded as the only proof of success in battle; they never acknowledged defeat while they had them.

== Battle of Wahoo Swamp ==
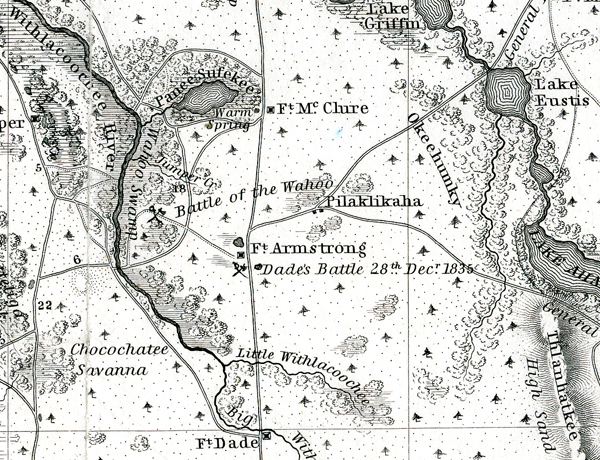
Excerpt from "A Map of the Seat of War in Florida" by Captain John Mackay and Lieutenant J. Black, U.S. Topographical Engineers, 1839, showing location of Battle of Wahoo Swamp

On November 18, 1836, Gen. Call, having left his baggage train under a strong guard, marched again, with 550 Tennesseans, chiefly foot soldiers, to the Wahoo Swamp. At about 3 miles from their camp, they fell upon a large Indian trail, which led through two dense hammocks, and over two creeks, into a large field, surrounded on three sides by hammocks. The Seminoles were retreating to gain securer positions to begin the attack, leaving their houses in flames; at length, making a stand, the Tennesseans formed a line of attack.

The foot soldiers in the regiment under Col. William Trousdale were formed in open order to charge into the hammock, while the horsemen, to the right and left, were thrown back to protect the flank, and to act as a reserve corps. The columns had not received the word to advance, when a tremendous volley of gunfire was opened along their whole front, from a hammock. They began slowly to advance, exchanging shots at short intervals. The order being given to charge, it was quickly obeyed; but the Indians did not break and fly as formerly; they stood and fought hand to hand, while at the same time their wings attacked both flanks of the army, and a small body of about 50 men fell on its rear.

The battle had raged nearly half an hour, when a general charge broke out and dispersed them in every direction, leaving 25 of their number dead on the field, while the whites had but three killed and 18 wounded. Six hundred Seminoles were said to have been engaged in this battle. The hour being late, and the men exhausted, the army retreated to its appointed place for the meeting with Col. Pierce, near Dade's battleground.

On November 21, Gen. Armstrong ordered a combined attack, and the army marched, in three columns, into the swamp with the Tennesseans and regulars, and Col. Warren's mounted men on the right, the center under Col. Pierce, and the Creek regiment on the left, the line extending for a full mile. When they came to the battleground of the 18th, they found it in possession of the Indians. As the Tennesseans and regulars advanced, a heavy fire was opened upon them, but they did not answer it until they got into the midst of the Indians; then charging them, the Seminoles gave way and retreated.

As soon as the direction of their retreat was observed by a party in reserve, Col. Pierce, with his division, and the Creek Indians, were ordered to pursue them; soon afterwards, Col. Trousdale with his regiment, and Col. Warren with the Florida horsemen, were sent to support them. The greater part of the regulars and Tennesseans, however, by taking a trail to the right, were caught in an almost impassable morass, where no horse could move, and where the men were obliged to wade waist-deep in mud and water. A small number of Creek warriors on the left, led by Col. Brown, taking a better path, followed closely upon the enemy and found them strongly positioned in a cypress swamp. The Creeks charged them, and their leader, Major David Moniac, a mix-blooded Creek who was the first Native American to graduate from West Point, was shot and killed while trying to determine how deep the stream was, as also were several other Creek warriors. It was soon discovered that this party would be overpowered, and the struggle was momentarily becoming even more desperate, when two companies of Florida militia under Capt. Groves and Lieut. Myrick, three companies of artillery under Maj. Gardner, Capts. Tompkins, Porter, and Lee, and Col. Waire with his mounted men, coming successively into action, enabled the Creeks to maintain their ground.

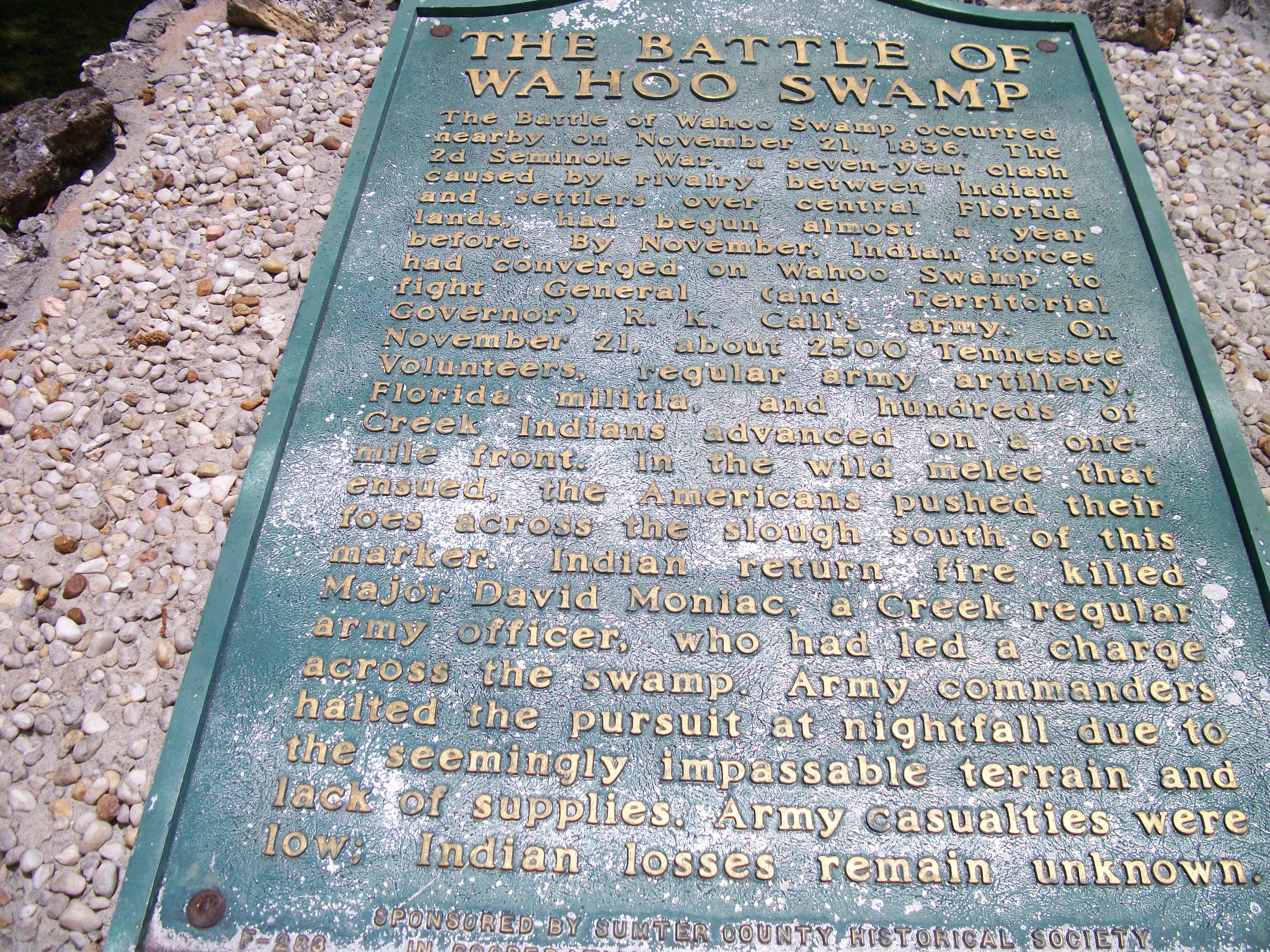
Plaque near the battle site

It was not until nearly all the force of the Tennesseans was brought to bear on this point that the Indians could be dislodged. Thus ended the second battle of the Wahoo Swamp, in which Gen. Call's army suffered 25 casualties, with nine being killed. The Indians left 10 on the field; but the whites said they lost "50 at least."

Call had pushed the Seminole back through the swampy marsh, consequently they had retreated southward by nightfall and Call chose not to pursue them because of the difficult terrain. The army having consumed all its provisions and made its way out of this hostile region; it accordingly returned to its late encampment at 10 o'clock at night, and the next day marched for Volusia.

== Aftermath ==
The offensive against the Seminoles began in the fall of 1836 under the leadership of Gen. Call, a protégé of President Jackson and a veteran of previous Indian Wars; however, it failed to achieve its objective of neutralizing the Indian resistance to involuntary removal. Leading a large force of volunteers, regular soldiers, and mercenary Creeks, Call managed to force the Seminole from their strongholds near the Withlacoochee River, but he was thwarted at the Battle of Wahoo Swamp; being unable to advance in the swamp, he fell back to Volusia, allowing the Indians time to escape into the unmapped Florida wilderness, from which they continued to send war parties to attack the whites' plantations.

On December 9, Call was relieved of overall command and replaced by Major Gen. Thomas Jesup, who returned with the federal troops to Fort Brooke. As the short enlistments of the volunteers ended in late December, they went home. Osceola himself led hit-and-run raids against vulnerable Army detachments and outposts until he was captured on October 21, 1837, under a white flag of truce near Fort Peyton a few miles south of St. Augustine, by Gen. Joseph Marion Hernández, per Gen. Jesup's orders.

== See also ==
- Seminole Wars
- American Indian Wars
