= Le Clerc Milfort =

French military officer and adventurer

Brigadier General Le Clerc Milfort
- Born: Jean-Antoine Le Clerc; February 2, 1752; Thin-le-Moutier, Kingdom of France
- Died: July 17, 1821 (aged 69); Villevallier, Napoleonic France
- Spouses: Jeannet McGillivray (m. 1790) Marie-Anne Beya (m. 1811)
- Children: François Leclerc de Milfort
- Military career
- Allegiance: Kingdom of France; Muscogee Creek Confederacy; First French Republic; First French Empire
- Branch: French Imperial Army
- Service years: 1764–1810
- Rank: Brigadier General
- Commands: (Kingdom of Italy (Napoleonic)) Army of Italy (France)
- Conflicts: American Revolutionary War; Napoleonic Wars; Peninsular War; War of the Sixth Coalition

Jean-Antoine Le Clerc, also known as Louis Milfort, also spelled as Milford (February 2, 1752 – July 17, 1821) was a French military officer and adventurer who led Creek Indian warriors during the American Revolutionary War as allies of the British. Le Clerc emigrated to the British North American colonies in 1779 and lived in the Creek Upper Towns (in present-day Alabama) until 1795, where he befriended Alexander McGillivray, who later made him a war chief. After returning to France, he joined the Sacred Order of the Sophisians and was promoted to Brigadier general.

== Early life ==
Born Jean-Antoine Le Clerc (or Leclerc) in Thin-le-Moutier, near Mézières, Ardennes, France. Le Clerc adopted different aliases during his life, especially Jean LeClerc Milfort, and Louis Le Clerc Milfort. He served in the French army from 1764–1774. According to his 1802 memoir, after having killed a servant of the king's household in a duel, Milfort emigrated to North America, arriving in Boston.

== Among the Creek Indians ==
Le Clerc went to Indian territory east of the Mississippi River (present-day Alabama), where he lived and traveled with the Creek Indians of the Upper Towns, in what was former French territory of La Louisiane. He gained Creek friendship by adopting their customs and was said to have been adopted into the tribe. Milfort lived with the Upper Creek in present-day Alabama from 1776 until 1795.

During the American Revolutionary War, Colonel Alexander McGillivray, chief of the Creek and commissioned by his British allies, directed several expeditions against the rebel colonists. He relied on Le Clerc Milfort as his War Chief, or Tustunneggee (Tastenagy), to carry out his orders. Milfort led Upper Creek forces in battles against colonial frontier settlements. McGillivray remained at his base, controlling the chiefs, and compelling them to raise warriors to attack other settlements.

== Return to France ==
Hearing of the changes after the French Revolution, Milfort went to Philadelphia to get a passport in 1795. He returned to Paris in 1795 where he joined the Sacred Order of the Sophisians, a secret society formed during the Napoleonic years, as the 41st member. Le Clerc offered his services to the government, specifically to make a Franco-Creek alliance and revive French claims in North America.

Le Clerc manifested his wish to command a new French expedition in North America, a proposal well received by the foreign ministers Delacroix and Talleyrand-Périgord. Napoleon's decision to sell Louisiana to the United States in 1803 rendered Milfort's plan moot. Milfort was ordered to remain in France; he was commissioned as a general and forced to retire, but given a pension. During the Russian invasion of 1814, Milfort was attacked in his house and was rescued by French grenadiers. He died on July 17, 1821 at Villevallier.

== Marriage and family ==
As part of his alliance with the Creek, Milfort married Jeannet McGillivray, a sister of the chief Alexander McGillivray, of the Creek Indian Nation. They were both of Creek and Scots descent. Their nephew was the chief William "Red Eagle" Weatherford.

After returning to France, Milfort married Marie-Anne Beya (1778–1849) on 16 December 1811 in Clavy-Warby, Ardennes. The couple bore two children: François, born in 1813, and Marie Ortonica Amika, born in 1814, who died in infancy.

== His memoirs ==
He published Mémoires, ou coup-d'oeil rapide sur mes voyages en Louisiane, et mon séjour dans la nation Creeke (Paris: De l'Imprimerie de Giguet et Michaud, 1802). In his account, he described his travels, hoping to stimulate French interest in the lands of the Creek and Southeast Indians. In his 2007 book, the scholar Darius Alexander Spieth noted that Milfort used a ghostwriter for his memoirs. His book has been printed in English translation by Lakeside Classics.
