= William Bartram Arboretum =

Arboretum near Wetumpka, Alabama

Coordinates: 32.51°N 86.25°W

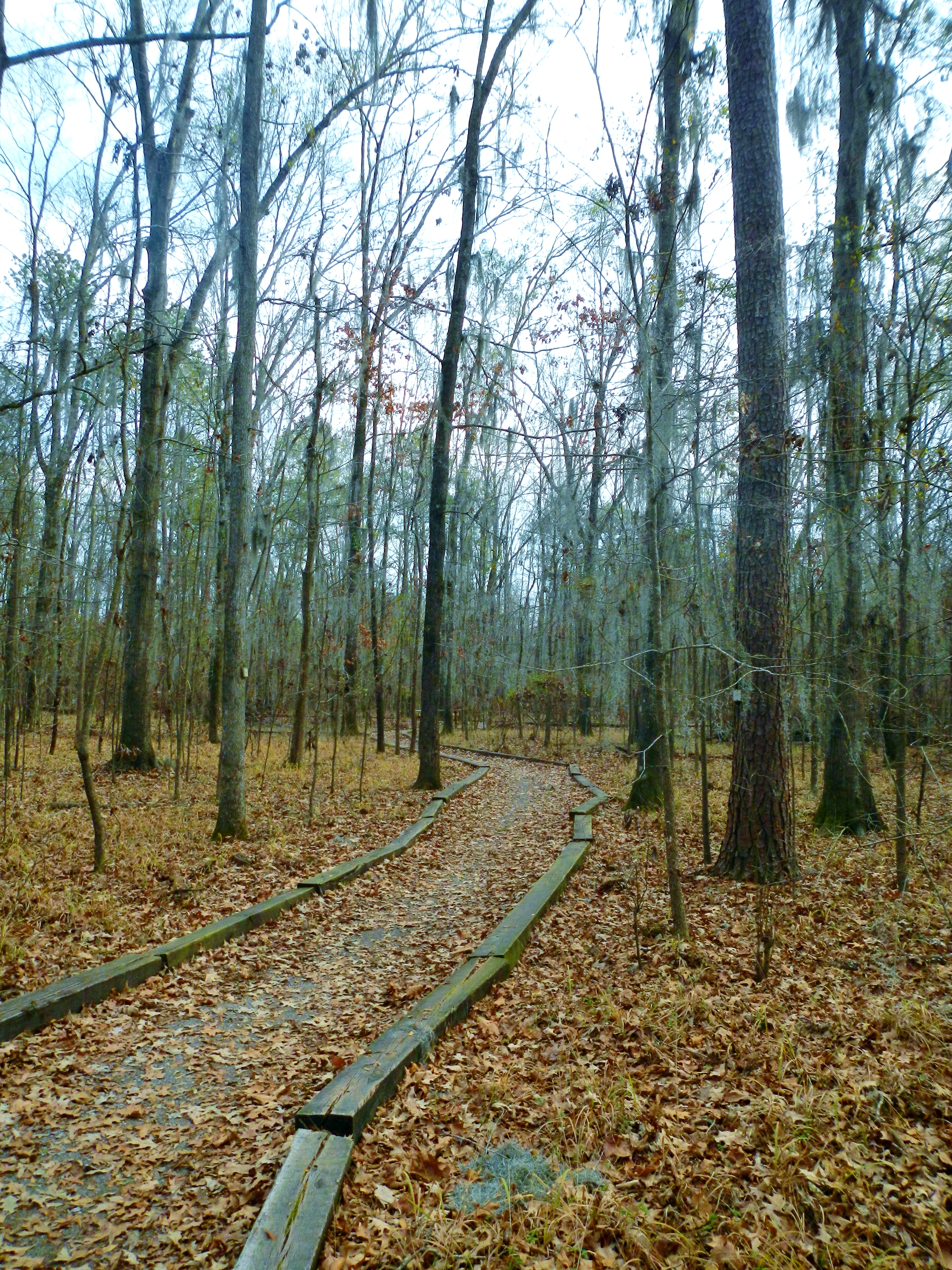
The William Bartram Arboretum in winter 2012.

The William Bartram Arboretum is an arboretum near Wetumpka, Alabama, in the United States. It is located off U.S. Route 231, at 2521 Fort Toulouse Road. The arboretum is named in honor of the 18th century naturalist William Bartram, who visited the area in 1776 while studying local flora and fauna.

Operated by the Alabama Historical Commission, the 30-acre (12 ha) William Bartram Arboretum is a part of the 165-acre (67 ha) Fort Toulouse-Jackson Park at the confluence of the Coosa and Tallapoosa Rivers. It opened on June 5, 1977, as a joint project of The Garden Club of Alabama and the Alabama Historical Commission. The arboretum is a boardwalk and series of paths through wildflower fields, bogs, and forests from the visitor center to Fort Toulouse, then down to an overlook of the Tallapoosa River. Shrubs and flowers are identified. The arboretum is open sunrise to sunset all year long.

== See also ==
- List of botanical gardens and arboretums in Alabama
