= Treaty of New York (1790) =

1790 treaty between the United States and Creek

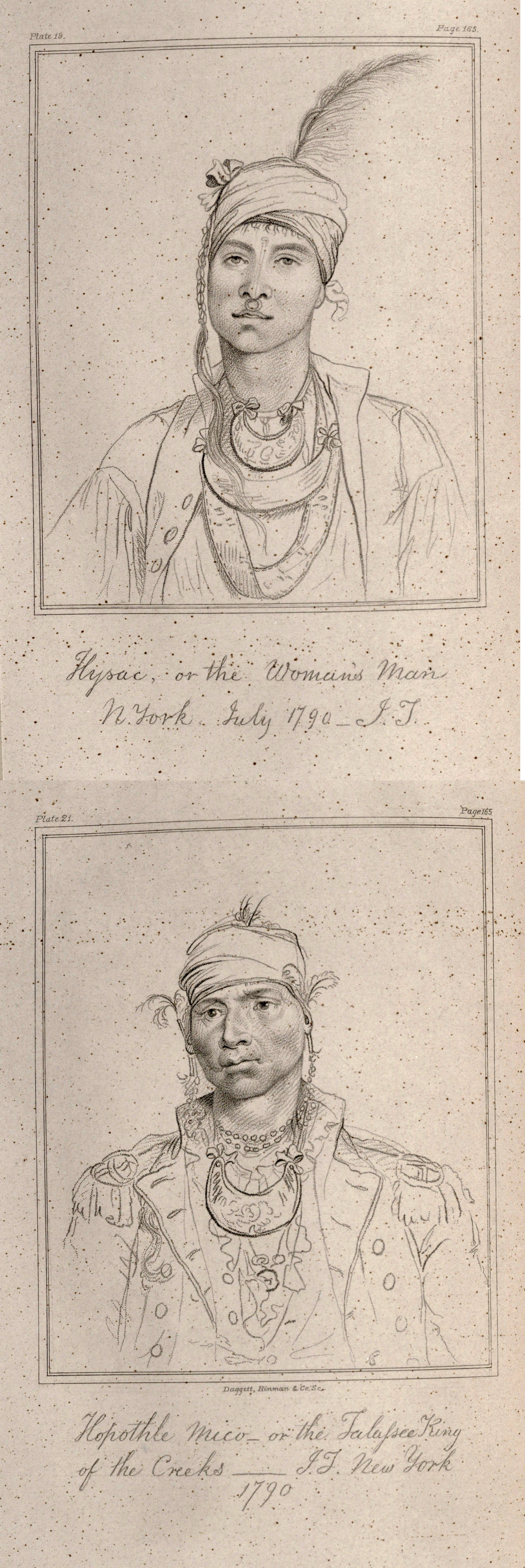
Sketches of Creek leaders, Hysac, or The Woman's Man, and Hopothle Mico, or, The Talassee King of the Creeks, made by John Trumbull in 1790 during negotiations (Yale Beinecke J18 T771 841)

The Treaty of New York was a treaty signed in 1790 between leaders of the Muscogee and U.S. Secretary of War Henry Knox, who served in the presidential administration of George Washington.

A failed 1789 attempt at a treaty between the United States and the Muscogee at Rock Landing, Georgia in 1789, was abruptly ended by Muscogee leader Alexander McGillivray, who described his grievances in a letter to the U.S. commissioners. Washington sent a special emissary, Marinus Willett, to McGillvray and persuaded him to come to New York City, which was the U.S. capital, to conduct a treaty with Washington and Knox directly.

In the summer of 1790, twenty-seven Muscogee leaders, led by McGillivray, traveled to New York and signed a treaty on behalf of the "Upper, Middle, and Lower Creek and Seminole composing the Creek nation of Indians." Informed of European legal customs by his Scottish father, McGillivray provided his formal signature on behalf of the Creek delegation. Creek leaders ceded a significant portion of their hunting grounds, including land stretching to the Oconee River, to the United States and agreed to turn fugitive American slaves over to federal authorities, but Muscogee leaders averred that convincing their people to honor the new boundary lines and return enslaved African-Americans would be difficult at best.

The United States granted the Muscogee the right to punish non-indigenous trespassers in their territory but refused to allow them to punish non-indigenous people who committed crimes on Creek lands. The Muscogee agreed to turn over to U.S. courts any member of their tribe who was accused of crimes. In a secret side agreement, McGillivray was also granted a commission as a brigadier in the United States Army, with an annual salary of $1,500. The treaty also provided the tribes with agricultural supplies and tools.

McGillivray was granted permission to import goods through the Spanish port of Pensacola without paying American duties. He also received $100,000 in compensation for the seized lands of his father.

The Treaty of New York was the first treaty between the United States and Native Americans that was not held in Indian-controlled lands.

Historian Joseph J. Ellis says Washington hoped to stop the (de facto genocidal) removal of Native American populations from U.S. territory, and envisioned Indian nations would some day be admitted to the American union as U.S. states. Ellis says the treaty failed because the military strength of the federal government was insufficient to police the borders of Muscogee territory, and white American settlers infiltrated it despite the treaty.

== See also ==
- List of treaties
- Nonintercourse Act
