= Sehoy III =

Creek trader (c. 1750 – 1813)

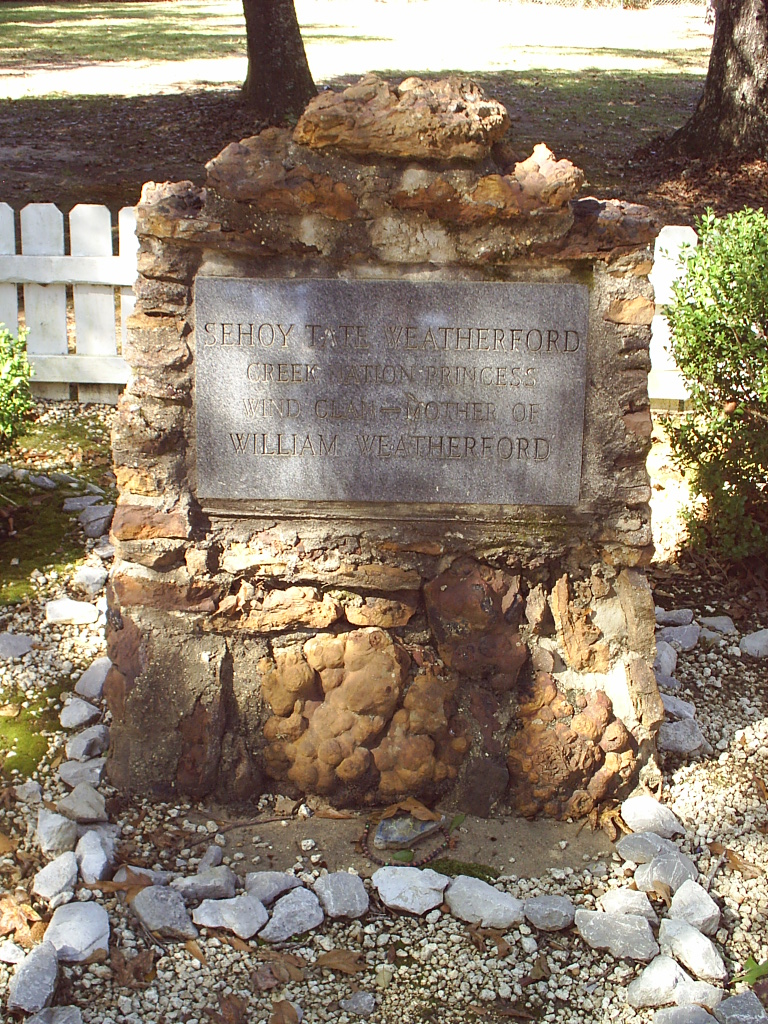
Grave of Sehoy III

Sehoy III, also called Sehoy Weatherford (c. 1750 – c. 1813) was a Muscogee Creek trader who was part of the Sehoy matrilineage. Like her mother and grandmother, both also called Sehoy, she contracted multiple marriages with white traders. According to Muscogee custom, her sons inherited her tribal identity and later fought on the Creek side of the Creek War and the Red Sticks rebellion. After inheriting property, Sehoy III set herself up as a successful trader in Coosada.

== Early life and family ==
She was born around 1750 to Sehoy II, a Muscogee Wind Clan woman, and her husband Malcolm McPherson, a Scottish trader. (Other family tradition makes Sehoy III's father a Tuckabatchee chieftain). Her siblings were Elizabeth and Malcolm McPherson II; she also had half-siblings, Sophia Durant, Alexander McGillivray, and Jeanette Milfort Crook, from Sehoy II's marriage to Lachlan McGillivray. After being raised by his Scottish father, Alexander positioned himself as a Creek leader, with Sophia acting as his spokesperson.

When she was about eight years old, Sehoy III moved into the household of Alexander's advisor and eventual father-in-law, the Dutch trader Jacob Moniac, and his wife Polly. When she was about fifteen, Sehoy III and Jacob had a daughter, Hannah.

== David Taitt ==
In about 1776, in Little Tallassee, Sehoy III married David Taitt, a Scottish surveyor and mapmaker who was Deputy Superintendent of Indian Affairs to the Creek Nation at the time. Taitt was a colleague of Sehoy's half-brother Alexander McGillivray, who foiled a Creek plot to assassinate him in 1777. He and Sehoy had two children, Davy (b. 1778) and Eloise, who spelled their surname Tate. Alexander McGillivray's family mostly raised Davy from age twelve. Davy was later involved with the Creek War. David Taitt left Little Tallassee in 1778 due to the request of his superintendent and the danger posed to him by factional fighting there, and he does not appear to have maintained contact with Sehoy III and their children.

== Charles Weatherford ==
In 1779/80, Sehoy III met and married Charles Weatherford, a trader from Virginia who had come to Coosada to seek refuge from Revolutionary War fighting. Their children were William (b. 1781) and Elizabeth, who married a pair of siblings from the Moniac family. Charles Weatherford established a plantation downstream from Sehoy's residence at Coosada, where he trafficked stolen horses. He spent twelve months imprisoned for debt in 1787–8. During that time, Alexander McGillivray petitioned the Spanish officials for his release on the grounds of the distress of Sehoy and their children. In 1798 he narrowly escaped being exiled by a council of Creek elders for being a 'meddler.'

In 1799, Sehoy III claimed her brother Malcolm II's property when he died according to Creek law. Charles had moved to a smaller residence downstream and Sehoy, defending her matrilineal wealth from him, ran a trading establishment and lived 'in some taste, but expensively.' Hawkins reports that she enslaved thirty Black people. Charles eventually left for the Bahamas.

Sehoy III died about 1813, at which time her son William Weatherford was emerging as a leader in the Red Sticks.
