= Battle of Holy Ground =

- Part of the Creek War
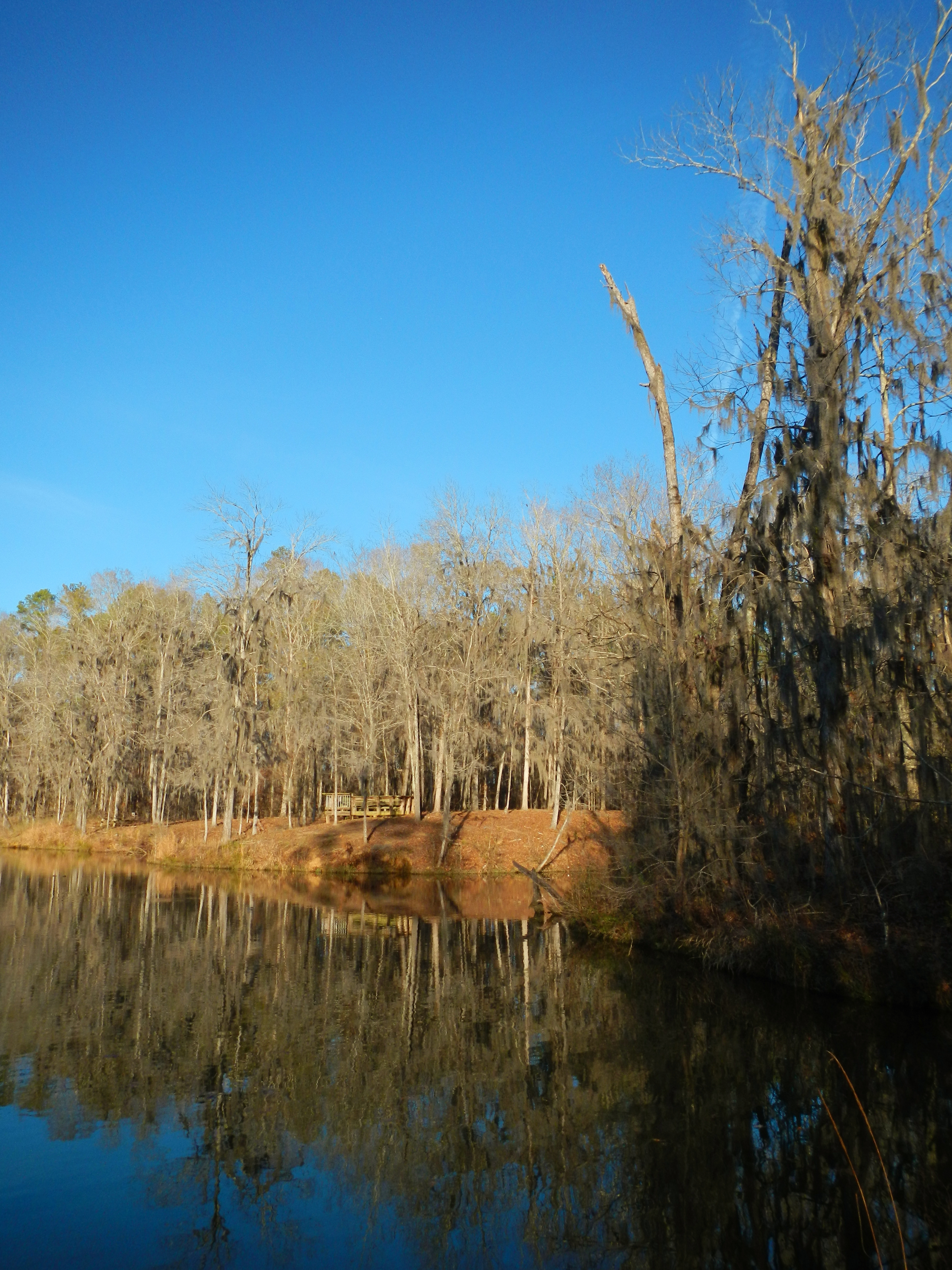
- The Alabama River at Holy Ground Battlefield Park
Date	December 23, 1813
Location	Mississippi Territory 32.35325°N 86.69243°W
Result	Indecisive

Belligerents
Red Stick Creek	United States

Commanders and leaders
William Weatherford	Ferdinand Claiborne; Pushmataha

Strength
~320	~1,000

Casualties and losses
~20–30 killed	1 killed

Holy Ground Battlefield Park
- Location: Lowndes County, Alabama

Alabama Register of Landmarks and Heritage
- Official name: Holy Ground Battle Site
- Designated: May 26, 1976

The Battle of Holy Ground, or Battle of Econochaca (Meaning holy ground in Creek), was fought on December 23, 1813, between the United States militia and the Red Stick Creek Indians during the Creek War. The battle took place at Econochaca, the site of a fortified encampment established in the summer of 1813 by Josiah Francis on a bluff above the Alabama River, in what is now Lowndes County, Alabama. It was one of three encampments erected by Red Stick Creeks that summer. In addition to the physical defenses, Creek prophets performed ceremonies at the site to create a spiritual barrier of protection. Hence the Creek name "Econochaca," loosely translated as holy ground, but properly translated as sacred or beloved ground.

== History ==
Following the Battle of Burnt Corn and the subsequent Fort Mims massacre, General Ferdinand Claiborne, under the orders of General Thomas Flournoy, began attempting to round-up troops to attack the Red Stick Creeks. By early December he had amassed a force of roughly 1,000 men, including 150 Choctaw warriors under their leader, Pushmataha. Weatherford's Creeks numbered around 320 men. On December 13, Claiborne's force set out from Fort Claiborne to Holy Ground. On December 22, 1813, Claiborne's force set up camp about 10 miles (16 km) south of Econochaca. Upon learning of this, the Creeks, under William Weatherford, evacuated women and children from settlement. On December 23 Claiborne attacked the defenses, killing between 20 and 30 Red Stick warriors and losing one man himself. Most of the Creeks escaped, with Weatherford riding his horse, Arrow over the bluff and into the river while under fire. The U.S. forces then destroyed the encampment and the Creek supplies.

The site is now home to Holy Ground Battlefield Park, maintained by the United States Army Corps of Engineers. It was added to the Alabama Register of Landmarks and Heritage on May 26, 1976.

Two active battalions of the Regular Army (1-1 Inf and 2-1 Inf) perpetuate the lineage of the old 3rd Infantry Regiment, elements of which were at the Battle of Econochaca.
