= Sacred Order of the Sophisians =

French Masonic order

The Ordre Sacré des Sophisiens (Sacred Order of the Sophisians) was a French Masonic order founded in Paris. Created in 1801, the order was shaped by the cultural impact of Napoleon’s Egyptian Campaign. Historically noted for its Egyptian-themed and highly theatrical initiation rites, the order was also known for briefly attracting prominent military, scientific, artistic, and international members.

== History ==
Its headquarters was in Paris, where it was founded in 1801 within the Lodge of the Frères-Artistes by the playwright Jean-Guillaume-Antoine Cuvelier. The Sacred Order of the Sophisians presented its teachings and rituals as derived from ancient Egypt, drawing on esoteric interpretations of Classical antiquity and using ritual and symbolism as instruments of moral, intellectual, and spiritual instruction.The Order existed for only a brief period. Active during the early years of the nineteenth century, it disappeared by 1807, leaving behind limited documentary evidence and remaining known primarily through contemporary Masonic records and later historical references.
