= Jean Baptiste Louis DeCourtel Marchand =

Jean Baptiste Louis DeCourtel Marchand, aka Captain Francois Marchand de Courcelles, was an 18th-century French officer who served in the French colonies in America, and died after a second tour or duty ending in 1734. Marchand fathered two children with Sehoy, a daughter of the matrilineal Wind Clan of the Creek Nation, during his time in Alabama: Chief Red Shoes (1720 d. 1784) and Sehoy II Marchand (1722-1785), herself mother of Sehoy III McPherson (with trader Malcolm McPherson) and Creek Chief Alexander McGillivray (with trader Lachlan McGillivray). Moreover William Weatherford, the notorious Red Eagle, and his half-brother the mestizo Charles Weatherford were the sons of Sehoy III.

Captain Marchand was the French military commanding officer of the colonial trading post at Fort Toulouse, who suppressed a rebellion around 1721 and was relieved of his command or left abruptly around 1722, and returned for another tour.
