= Hickory Ground =

Archaeological site in Alabama, United States

Otciapofa Ocē Vpofv Odshiapofa, Ocheopofau, and Ocheubofau
- Interactive map of Otciapofa
- Coordinates: 32.526667°N 86.209167°W
- Established: 1790s
- Abandoned: 1832

Hickory Ground, also known as Otciapofa (or Odshiapofa, Ocheopofau, Ocheubofau) is an historic Upper Muscogee Creek tribal town and an archaeological site in Elmore County, Alabama, United States, near Wetumpka. It is known as Ocē Vpofv in the Muscogee language; the name derives from oche-ub 'hickory' and po-fau 'among'. It is best known for serving as the last capital of the National Council of the Creek Nation, prior to the tribe being moved to the Indian Territory in the 1830s. It was added to the National Register of Historic Places on March 10, 1980.

== History ==
Hickory Ground, or Otciapofa, was established by Muscogee Creeks from Little Tulsa, located on the Coosa River. The site was documented during historic times by William Bartram in the 1770s and Benjamin Hawkins in 1799. The town was home to several thousand Muscogee, including Billy Weatherford, who is an ancestor of Poarch Band members, and served as the last capital of the National Council of the Creek Nation from 1802 until 1814. During the Creek War, the inhabitants who were not fighting in the war were confined at nearby Fort Jackson. After the end of the war, they were allowed to resettle the site and remained there until 1832, when they were forcibly removed to the Indian Territory.

The site was rediscovered in 1968 by archaeologist David Chase of Auburn University. The rediscovery was not made public until much later, when plans to build apartments on the site were announced. Through the efforts of the Alabama Historical Commission and the Poarch Band of Creek Indians, the site was acquired in early 1980 through matching funds of $165,000 from the United States Department of the Interior and tax break incentives for the previous owner. Excavations in 1988 and 1991 found evidence of occupation at the site during five distinct cultural periods, ranging from the Early Archaic (8000–6000 B.C.) to the historic Muscogee occupation.

The members of Otciapofa tribal town, which included ancestors of current Poarch Creeks, formed part of the Muscogee Creek Confederacy in Alabama, prior to their forced removal to Indian Territory during the 1830s. After resettling in Indian Territory, the members of Hickory Ground established another town of that name near Henryetta, Oklahoma. Chitto Harjo belonged to new Hickory Ground, where the Crazy Snake Uprising of 1901 was launched.

- Hickory Ground
- U.S. National Register of Historic Places
- Location within Alabama Location within the United States
- Nearest city: Wetumpka, Alabama
- Coordinates: 32°31′36″N 86°12′33″W
- Area: 33.1 acres (13.4 ha)
- NRHP reference No.: 80000685
- Added to NRHP: March 10, 1980

== Archaeological site ==
The 33-acre archaeological site, (1EE89), is outside Wetumpka on the lower Coosa River, north of where it joins the Tallapoosa River. It is a former village with a ceremonial ground, burial grounds, and refuse sites.

== Controversy ==
In August 1980, the property was granted to the Poarch Band. It was placed under a 20-year easement that limited development of the property. The site became part of the Poarch Band's reservation lands in 1984, when they became a federally recognized tribe. Following the expiration of the easement, the Poarch built a Native American bingo hall at the site from 2001 to 2002, which required the excavation of the bingo hall site and exhumation of Muscogee graves found there. The Muscogee (Creek) Nation of Oklahoma called construction at the site "deplorable" and claimed that many burials were disturbed during the initial building phase. This commercial development of the site for a bingo hall was also opposed by other tribes, from both inside and outside the state; the Alabama Historical Commission; Alabama's delegation in the House of Representatives, which introduced legislation in a failed attempt to stop it; and roughly 50 Poarch members, who wrote letters to the Alabama Historical Commission.

The July 2012 announcement of a $246 million expansion to create a 20-story hotel and casino at the site caused further outcry from the Muscogee Creek Nation and the threat of legal action. The Poarch denied that the historic site itself was affected by their development, stating in a news release that it was "protected land that is not part of a casino expansion." The dispute over the development of Hickory Ground is part of a wider disagreement between the Poarch Band and the Muscogee (Creek) Nation about cultural identity, tradition, and authenticity.

The Montgomery Advertiser's article of August 21, 2012, stated: Robert McGhee, a member of the Poarch Band tribal council gave no indication that the group planned to halt construction and disagreed with Tiger's charge that the group lacked respect for cultural values. "We have taken great care to honor history and preserve the past while ensuring the future for our tribe," he responded by email to the Advertiser. "It is unfortunate that neither the issue nor our response to it was portrayed accurately, but we understand that these centuries-old wounds are deep and the hurt that resulted from tribes being forcibly removed from the Southeast still remains."

On October 12, 2012, the Inter-Tribal Council of the Five Civilized Tribes, including the Chickasaw, Choctaw, Cherokee, Muscogee (Creek) and Seminole Nations, unanimously adopted a resolution supporting efforts to halt the desecration of Hickory Ground.

On December 12, 2012, the Muscogee Creek Nation and the Hickory Ground Tribal Town filed a federal lawsuit in the U.S. District Court for the Middle District of Alabama to stop the casino development. The lawsuit alleges that the excavation of Muscogee Creek human remains and funerary objects from Hickory Ground violated the Native American Graves Protection and Repatriation Act (NAGPRA) and other federal laws. Auburn University confirmed that multiple human remains and associated grave goods were disinterred from Hickory Ground.

On May 14, 2015, Poarch Creek Chief Legal Officer Lori Stinson testified before the Subcommittee on Indian and Insular Affairs and responded to misleading allegations on the issue of Hickory Ground. Stinson commented that the decisions to develop Hickory Ground for tribal economic endeavors were prompted by other legal and political problems regarding the sovereignty of American Indian nations. The Poarch Band had no land in trust besides the lands at Hickory Ground. Stinson also notes that the Poarch Band purchased the lands in 1980 to avoid them being sold to a "big box retailer," further mentioning that before the Tribe purchased the lands, "the property had been flooded by the Coosa River and farmed for more than a century, and decades of commercial development surrounded the tract," including a housing subdivision, a Winn-Dixie, multiple restaurants, Alabama State Roads, Elmore County buildings, and various businesses. Stinson emphasized that tribes have to build an economy to exercise sovereignty, and responded that the Tribe will continue "to preserve our tribal history and culture while undertaking projects that assure the financial stability of our tribal government and economic security for our people."

The multi-story hotel is now open on the site.

== Hickory Ground, Oklahoma ==
Members of the Hickory Ground tribal town brought their fire to Indian Territory during the 1830s forced removal. They created a tribal town and ceremonial ground in Indian Territory, later to become Oklahoma. In 1895, Hickory Ground had a population of 343. Hickory Ground ceremonial leaders, such as Lahtah Micco and Chitto Harjo, led the resistance to allotment, and they collectively were names "Snakes" and formed the Four Mothers Society, a religious and political organization resisting allotment and other attacks on tribal sovereignty.

== See also ==
- Four Mothers Society
- Stomp dance
