= Alexander McGillivray =

Muscogee leader (1750–1793)

- Hopuewv Herē Mēkko (Creek)
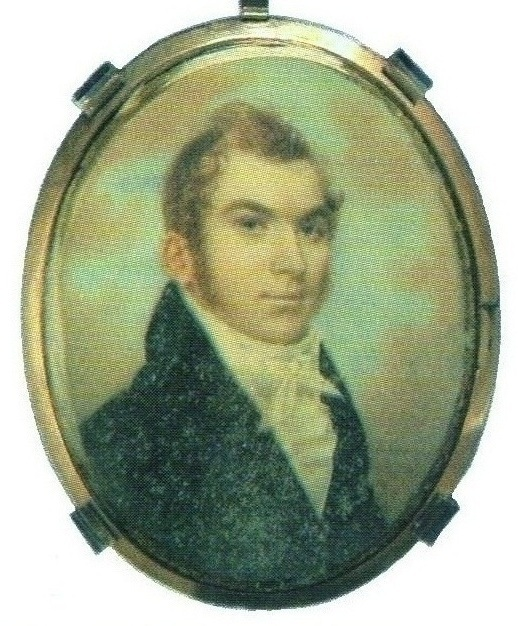
- A purported portrait of Alexander McGillivray contained in a silver locket.

Principal Chief of the Upper Creek towns
- In office 1783–1793
- Preceded by: Emistigo

Personal details
- Born: Hopuewv Herē Mēkko; December 15, 1750 Little Tallassee, Creek Confederacy (Now part of Alabama)
- Died: February 17, 1793 (aged 42) Pensacola, Spanish West Florida (Now part of Florida)
- Parents: Lachlan McGillivray (father); Sehoy II (mother)
- Relatives: Sehoy (grandmother); Jean Baptiste Louis DeCourtel Marchand (grandfather); Sophia Durant (sister)

Military service
- Allegiance: Creek Confederacy; British Empire (1776-1777); Spanish Empire (1784-1790); United States (1790-1793)
- Rank: Lieutenant colonel (British Empire); Commissary of the Creek Nation (Spanish Empire); Brigadier general (United States)

Alexander McGillivray, also known as Hoboi-Hili-Miko (Creek: Hopuewv Herē Mēkko; December 15, 1750 – February 17, 1793), was a Muscogee (Creek) leader. The son of a Muscogee mother, Sehoy II, and a Scottish father, Lachlan McGillivray, he was literate and received an education in the British colonies. His understanding of both Muscogee and European culture combined with his father's trading contacts allowed him to become the richest Creek of his time.

McGillivray's "voluminous" correspondence has survived. In many cases his biased letters are the primary source for events in his life. While early historians framed him as a heroic figure, later historians have criticized his tenure as corrupt.

McGillivray's status among the Creeks, who did not customarily have a single leader, was controversial and sometimes resented. His chief asset to ensure he was seen as a leader was his ability to hand out gifts to the Creek from both Britain and Spain. He was the most "Anglicized" of the Creek and built solid houses, planted orchards, and ran a plantation (and owned about 60 slaves), which made him suspect. His understanding of English and experience in the trading world also gave him influence, if not prestige. Yet as the illiterate Creek gradually became aware of his duplicity in the Treaty of New York and other matters, there "began a process that would culminate in the Redstick War."

== Early life ==
McGillivray was born Hopuewv Herē Mēkko (Good Child King) in the Coushatta village of Little Tallassee (also known as Little Tallase, Little Talisi and Little Tulsa) on the Coosa River, near present-day Montgomery, Alabama, on December 15, 1750. His mother, Sehoy Marchand, was the daughter of Sehoy, a mixed-race Creek woman of the prestigious Wind Clan ("Hutalgalgi"), and of Jean Baptiste Louis DeCourtel Marchand, a French officer at Fort Toulouse. McGillivray and his siblings were born into the Wind Clan, as the Muscogee had a matrilineal system and gained their status from their mother's clan. They identified as Creek. Their father was Lachlan McGillivray, a Scottish trader (of the Clan MacGillivray chief's lineage). He built trading posts among the Upper Towns of the Muscogee Confederacy, whose members had formerly traded with French Louisiana.

As a child, he briefly lived in Augusta with his father on one of his plantations. By the time he was 12, his father owned several large plantations totalling over 10,000 acres (4,000 ha), making him one of the largest landholders in the colony. His father was a delegate in the colonial Georgia Assembly and was "a partner in a profitable mercantile firm that dealt in slaves, among other commodities". In 1773, the boy was sent to school in Charleston, South Carolina, where he learned Latin and Greek. He was apprenticed at two trading companies, one of which was the second largest importer of slaves in Georgia. With the outbreak of the American Revolutionary War, his Loyalist father returned to Scotland, and his lands were confiscated. McGillivray served as a lieutenant colonel in the British Army during the war; he returned to his mother's people in Little Tallassee in 1777.

While he was accepted as a Creek because of his mother, he "was deeply alienated from most Creek traditions and from the vast majority of the Creek people." When he ascended to leadership, McGillivray relied on the help of his sister Sophia Durant, who often assisted him as a translator, interpreter, and as his spokesperson. (He did so because either he had difficulty with the varying Native dialects or because he wished to adhere to a diplomatic practice common among the Creek at the time). He had more book learning than any other Creek, and later in life he had a substantial library on natural history.

== Career ==
A skillful diplomat—an early writer called him "Talleyrand of the Creeks"—he was an inept military strategist and rarely participated in battle.

In 1783, McGillivray became the principal chief of the Upper Creek towns, or as Saunt puts it, "established himself as spokesman for a Creek nation that seemed far more unified on paper than it was in reality". His predecessor, Chief Emistigo, died while leading a war party to relieve the British garrison at Savannah, which was besieged by the Continental Army under General "Mad" Anthony Wayne. At one time, McGillivray claimed that he had 5,000 to 10,000 warriors, to arrive at which figure he included the Cherokee, Seminoles, and Chickamauga he came in contact with (but did not rule). However, he did not live a Creek lifestyle, as he built a plantation on the Little River and a second one on the Coosa River, just above modern Montgomery, Alabama. He built a log house with dormer windows and a stone chimney, both all but unknown in the Creek nation. He was not only literate, he was by far the wealthiest Creek of his time.

McGillivray opposed the 1783 Treaty of Augusta, under which two Lower Creek chiefs had ceded Muscogee lands from the Ogeechee to the Oconee rivers to Georgia. In June 1784 he negotiated the Treaty of Pensacola with Spain, which recognized Muscogee sovereignty over three million acres (12,000 km^{2}) of land claimed by Georgia, guaranteed access to the British fur-trading company Panton, Leslie & Company, and made McGillivray an official representative of Spain, with a $50 (~$1,164 in 2025) monthly salary. McGillivray became a partner in Panton, Leslie & Co., and used his control over the deerskin trade to expand his power.

McGillivray sought Creek independence after the Treaty of Paris (1783). He sought to create mechanisms of centralized political authority (in himself), to end the traditional village autonomy by which individual chiefs had signed treaties and ceded land. Armed by British traders operating out of Spanish West Florida, the Muscogee raided back-country European-American settlers to protect their hunting grounds. From 1785 to 1787, Upper Creek war parties fought alongside the Cherokee in the Cherokee–American wars in present-day Tennessee. In 1786 a council of the Upper and Lower Creek in Tuckabatchee declared war against Georgia; the Spanish officials opposed this, and after they told McGillivray they would reduce aid if he persisted, he entered into peace talks with the U.S. A Loyalist like his father, McGillivray resented the developing United States Indian policy; however, he did not wish to leave Creek territory. McGillivray became a leading spokesman (self-appointed) for all the tribes along the Florida-Georgia border areas.

Georgia's Yazoo land scandal convinced President George Washington that the federal government needed to control Indian affairs rather than allowing the states to make treaties. In 1790 he sent a special emissary to the southeast, who persuaded McGillivray and other chiefs to attend a conference with Henry Knox, the Secretary of War, in New York City, then the capital of the U.S. The conference resulted in the Treaty of New York (1790). (For decades Indian policy was under the oversight of the War Department.) McGillivray and 29 other chiefs signed the Treaty of New York on behalf of the 'Upper, Middle and Lower Creek and Seminole composing the Creek nation of Indians'. McGillivray was the only one who could sign his name, and Lower Creeks complained that they had no representative present (none was invited), and that the Creek signers had no right to give away their lands. The first treaty negotiated after ratification of the U.S. Constitution, it established the Altamaha and Oconee rivers as the boundary between Creek lands and the United States. The U.S. government promised to remove illegal white settlers from the area, and the Muscogee agreed to return fugitive black slaves who sought refuge with the tribe. This provision angered the Seminoles of Florida, who had provided refuge to numerous escaped slaves and had intermarried with some. The Black Seminoles by this time had communities allied with the Seminoles. The Creeks "soon concluded that McGillivray had deceived them".

Under secret provisions in the treaty, McGillivray was commissioned as a brigadier general of the U.S., with an annual salary of $1,200. He was also granted permission to import goods via Pensacola without paying duties, and paid $100,000 for his father's confiscated properties. With this money, he acquired three plantations and 60 African American slaves. The treaty temporarily pacified the Southern frontier, but the U.S. failed to honor its obligation and did not eject white settlers who were illegally on Creek lands. In addition, he was a "secret partner" of the trading firm Panton, Leslie and Company, one of his principal sources of power, according to Thomas Jefferson, who met him in 1790.

== Later years, death, and legacy ==
In 1792, McGillivray repudiated the Treaty of New York. He negotiated another with Spanish officials, who ruled Louisiana. They promised to respect Muscogee sovereignty. McGillivray was a man of remarkable ability, as evident from his success in keeping both the United States and Spain paying for his influence at the same time. He was also the superintendent-general of the Creek nation on behalf of Spain, the Indian agent of the United States, the mercantile partner of Panton, and self-appointed "emperor" of the Creek and Seminole nations.

McGillivray moved to Pensacola, where he became a member of the Masonic Order. His health began to fail; as Michael D. Green writes, "Never a robust man, he suffered throughout his adult life from the effects of syphilis and rheumatism. It seems that, exhausted by the pace of his life, he simply wore out." He died on February 17, 1793, in Pensacola and was buried in William Panton's backyard and garden, wrote Edward Forrester, a mixed-blood trader among the Lower Creeks, in a letter to Nepomuceno de Quesada, the Spanish governor of East Florida at St. Augustine. McGillivray's sister had his body reinterred at Choctaw Bluff, where he had earlier had his plantation, in modern Clarke County, Alabama, on the Alabama River.

Two of his maternal nephews, William Weatherford and William McIntosh, who were also born into the powerful Creek Wind Clan ("Hotvlkvlke" in Mvskoke, pronounced approximately "Hutalgalgi"), became the most important Muscogee leaders in the early 19th century. They fought on opposing sides of the Creek War, a conflict that arose between traditionalists, such as Weatherford, and those of the Lower Creek, such as McIntosh, who believed it was necessary to adapt and take on useful European-American customs. In part the conflict arose because of the peoples' geographic positions; those closer to European-American settlement had more interaction with the Americans, as well as the benefits.
