= Fort Toulouse and Fort Jackson =

- Fort Toulouse Site-Fort Jackson
- U.S. National Register of Historic Places
- U.S. National Historic Landmark
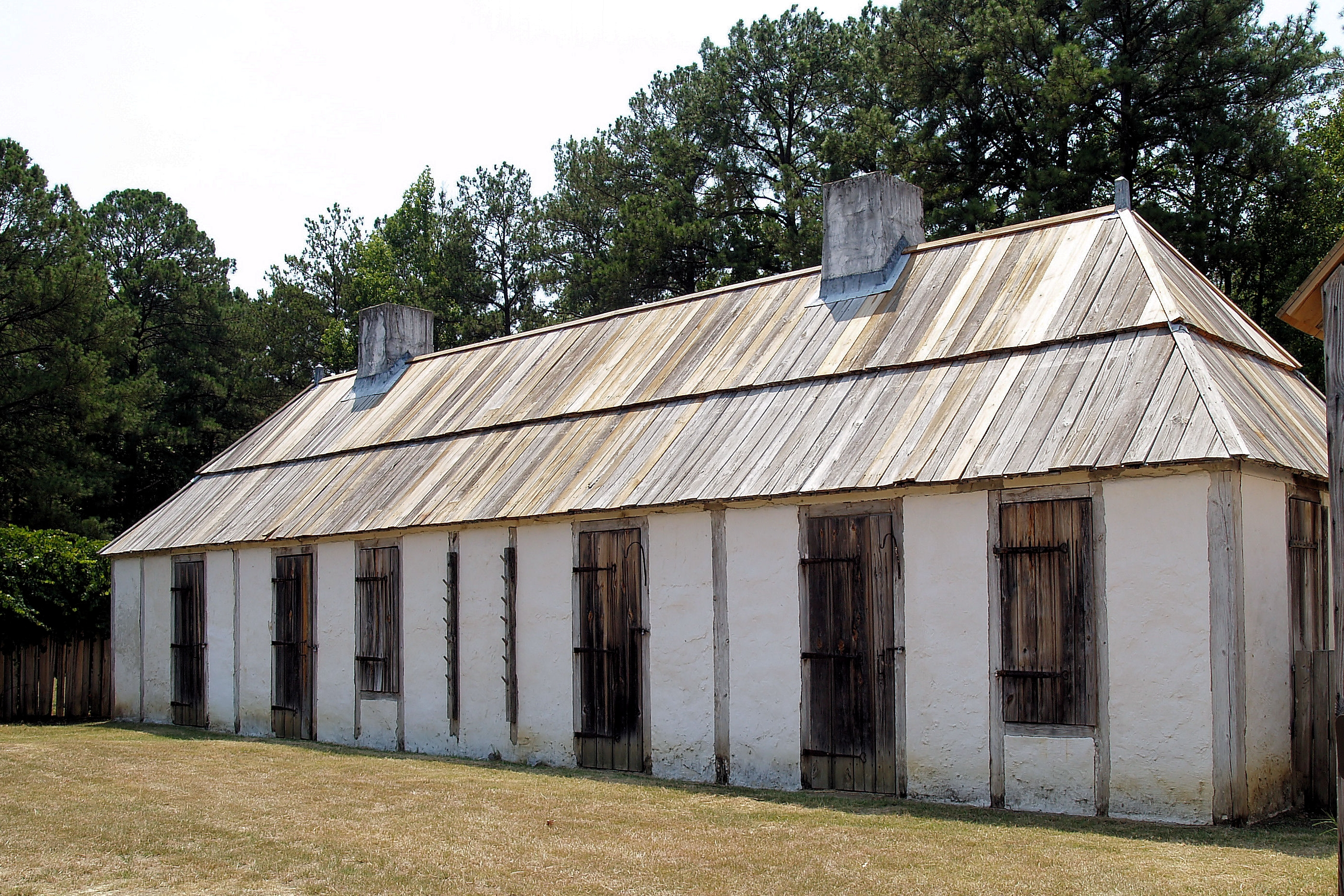
- A portion of the modern Fort Toulouse reconstruction, taken in 2007.

- Location within Alabama Location within the United States
- Nearest city: Wetumpka, Alabama
- Coordinates: 32°30′12″N 86°15′23″W
- Built: 1814
- NRHP reference No.: 66000148

Significant dates
- Added to NRHP: October 15, 1966
- Designated NHL: October 9, 1960

Fort Toulouse and Fort Jackson are two forts that shared similar locations at the fork of the Coosa River and the Tallapoosa River, near Wetumpka, Alabama, United States.

== Fort Toulouse ==
Fort Toulouse (Muscogee: Franca choka chula), also called Fort des Alibamons and Fort Toulouse des Alibamons, is a historic fort near the city of Wetumpka, Alabama, United States, that is now maintained by the Alabama Historical Commission. The French founded the fort in 1717, naming it for Louis-Alexandre de Bourbon, comte de Toulouse. In order to counter the growing influence of the British colonies of Georgia and Carolina, the government of French Louisiana erected a fort on the eastern border of the Louisiana Colony in what is now the state of Alabama.

The fort was also referred to as the Post of the Alabama, named after the Alabama tribe of Upper Creek Indians, who resided just below the confluence of the Coosa and Tallapoosa rivers on the upper reaches of the Alabama River.

The number of troops in garrison varied between 20 and 50 French Colonial Marines. Living and working at the fort, the Marines traded extensively with the local Creek Native Americans and cultivated friendly relations with them. The French would trade European goods such as Flintlock guns, ammunition, and gunpowder, iron tools, knives, glass beads, copper pots, and wool blankets in exchange for local food stuffs, fur and deerskins. According to tradition, the French commander Captain Jean Baptiste Louis DeCourtel Marchand married the high-status Creek woman Sehoy in about 1720. Later generations of Sehoy's descendants include the Creek chiefs Alexander McGillivray, and William Weatherford, who inherited their status in the matrilineal tribe from their mothers' clans.

Due to the poor living conditions at the fort, which was neglected by the French government, the troops mutinied in 1722. They killed Captain Marchand and captured the other officers, tying them up before leaving the fort. The imprisoned officers managed to escape, and with the help of nearby Creek, they captured the mutineers and sent them to Fort Conde in Mobile for punishment.

In 1735, the British built Fort Okfuskee further up the Tallapoosa River at Okfuskee to compete with French trade at Fort Toulouse. Fort Okfuskee was garrisoned by the Province of Georgia from 1735 to 1743 and by the Province of South Carolina from 1744 to 1745. Pierre de Rigaud, marquis de Vaudreuil-Cavagnial, the Governor of French Louisiana, demanded that the commandant of Fort Toulouse notify the Abihka and Tallapoosas that the French would withdraw trade from Fort Toulouse if they did not refuse to help build and destroy any constructed portions of South Carolina's Fort Okfuskee.

By the early 1740s, conditions had improved at the fort. Many soldiers had married French women from Mobile or intermarried with the local Creek. They and other settlers developed numerous farms nearby, which led to improved food supplies. The humid climate caused deterioration of the fort by the late 1740s, and the French planned for a third fort to be built. Under the direction of Captain Francois Saucier, soldiers finished the reconstruction of Fort Toulouse about 1751. It cost nearly half of the military budget for the whole Louisiana colony.

In 1763 the Treaty of Paris ended the French and Indian War. As the French had been defeated by the British and ceded their territory, the French garrison spiked their cannons and left for New Orleans and an eventual return to France for some. The British chose not to occupy the Fort, which eventually collapsed into decay. In 1776 the naturalist William Bartram noted visiting the area while studying local flora and fauna.

== Fort Jackson ==
In the midst of the War of 1812, an 1813 civil war in the Creek Nation led to an invasion by Americans from Tennessee, Georgia, and Mississippi Territory. In the ensuing Creek War of 1813–1814, General Andrew Jackson commanded the combined American forces of Tennessee militia, U.S. regulars, and Cherokee and Creek Indian allies. Jackson defeated the Red Stick Creeks at the Battle of Horseshoe Bend in 1814, and afterwards initiated construction of a fort atop the site of the old French fort at the confluence of the Coosa and Tallapoosa rivers. The fort was intentionally built near the sacred Creek site known as the Hickory Ground. Jackson then temporarily traveled to Washington and in his absence, the fort was named "Jackson" in his honor. After Jackson's return, he imposed the Treaty of Fort Jackson upon both the Northern Creek enemies and the Southern Creek allies, wresting 20,000,000 acres (8,100,000 ha) from all Creeks for white settlement.

The site was declared a National Historic Landmark in 1960.

During the American Bicentennial in the mid-1970s an attempt was made to reconstruct Fort Toulouse, however the replica was incorrectly built upon the outline of the much larger Fort Jackson.

== Fort Toulouse-Fort Jackson State Historic Site ==
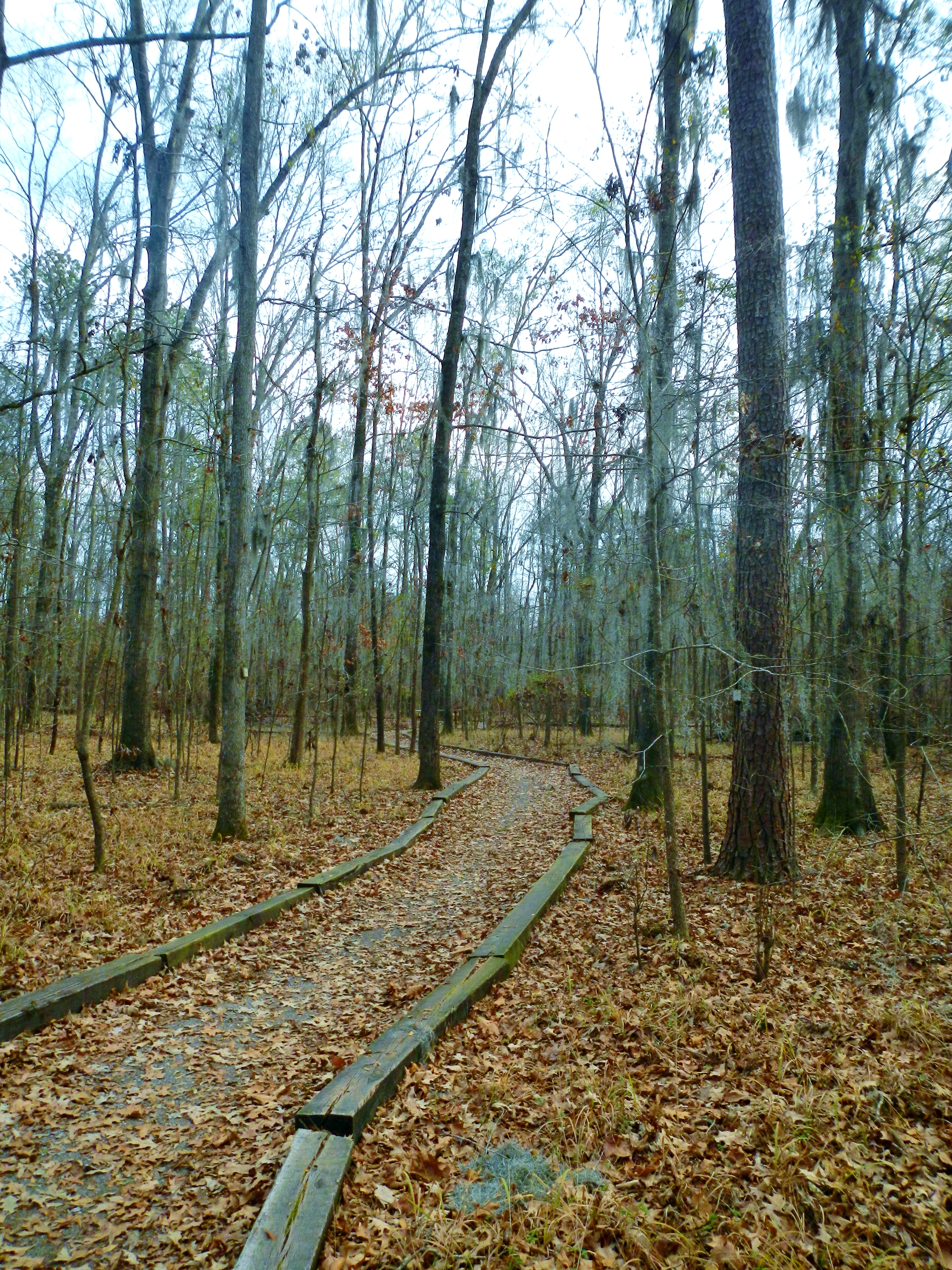
The William Bartram Arboretum is located inside Fort Toulouse-Jackson State Historic Site.

The site was declared a National Historic Landmark by the Department of Interior in 1960. During the American Bicentennial, local groups supported the reconstruction of Fort Toulouse. But the replica was incorrectly built upon the outline of the much larger Fort Jackson rather than the historic French fort.

In the 1980s the park was acquired by the Alabama Historical Commission. It dismantled the incorrect replica and constructed a replica of Fort Toulouse near its original site. This will allow for a future reconstruction of Ft. Jackson on its site (occupied successively by the two forts). Archeological excavations have been continuing at the site, supervised by Dr. Craig Sheldon of Auburn University at Montgomery.

The Fort Toulouse-Fort Jackson State Historic Site has living history programs to portray and interpret the lives of the Creek inhabitants, the French colonists and the U.S. military troops associated with the War of 1812. The fort is located southwest of Wetumpka, off of U.S. Highway 231.

The site also features the Taskigi Mound or "Mound at Fort Toulouse – Fort Jackson Park" (1EE1) a prehistoric South Appalachian Mississippian culture palisaded village with a central plaza area, and a rectangular platform mound. The mound is one of the locations included on the University of Alabama Museums "Alabama Indigenous Mound Trail".

The William Bartram Arboretum is an arboretum located at 2521 Fort Toulouse Road, near Wetumpka, Alabama, in the United States. In the 1980s the park became a property of the Alabama Historical Commission and the incorrectly built fort was dismantled and recycled to partially construct a "correct" replica of Ft. Toulouse adjacent to the original site, allowing for a future reconstruction of Ft. Jackson on the actual site once occupied by both forts.
