= Little River, Baldwin County, Alabama =

Unincorporated community in Alabama, United States

Little River, Alabama
- Unincorporated community
- Post office in Little River

- Location within Alabama Location within the United States
- Coordinates: 31°15′26″N 87°42′31″W
- Country: United States
- State: Alabama
- County: Baldwin
- Elevation: 177 ft (54 m)
- Time zone: UTC-6 (Central (CST))
  - Summer (DST): UTC-5 (CDT)
- ZIP code: 36550
- Area code: 251
- GNIS feature ID: 121857

Little River is an unincorporated community in Baldwin County, Alabama, United States. Its ZIP code is 36550. As of 1937, in addition to the post office, the community had two stores, several operations for the distillation of turpentine, and a sawmill. The area's economy was based on agriculture and the timber industry.
