= William Weatherford =

Creek chief of the Upper Creek towns

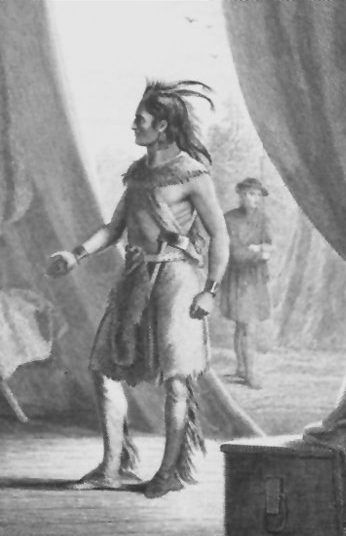

Creek Leader of the Red Sticks

Personal details
- Born: 1765 or 1780 Koasati village
- Died: March 24, 1824 Monroe County, Alabama
- Nickname: Red Eagle

Military service
- Battles/wars: Creek War; Fort Mims massacre; Battle of Talladega; Battle of Holy Ground; Battle of Calebee Creek

William Weatherford, also known after his death as Red Eagle (c. 1765 – March 24, 1824), was a Creek warrior of the Upper Creek towns who led many of the Red Sticks actions in the Creek War (1813–1814) against Lower Creek towns and against allied forces of the United States.

One of many mixed-race descendants of Southeast Indians who intermarried with European traders and later colonial settlers, William Weatherford was of mixed Creek, French, and Scots ancestry. He was raised as a Creek in the matrilineal nation and achieved his power in it, through his mother's prominent Wind Clan (as well as his father's trading connections). After the war, he rebuilt his wealth as a slaveholding planter in lower Monroe County, Alabama.

== Early life and education ==
William Weatherford was born in 1781 (Griffith Jr. analysis), near the Upper Creek towns of Cusseta. (Note: Griffith's analysis of Weatherford's date of birth is based on the death of his mother's first husband in the summer of 1780, see below and Griffith Jr., op. cit., p. 5.) (Note: Several sources state that Weatherford was born in 1765, the date recorded on a tombstone located in Little River, Baldwin County, Alabama. Many sources state that his mother, Sehoy III, was born in 1759, and his siblings are documented as being born in the 1780s.) It is near the current Cusseta, Georgia, and was then a Koasati Indian town, near Hickory Ground (current Wetumpka, Alabama). His mother was Sehoy III, a "daughter of a Tabacha chieftain" and from "the most powerful and privileged of all the Creek clans," the Wind Clan (in Muscogee, the Creek language, Hotvlkvlke). His father, Charles Weatherford, was a red-haired Scots trader and friend of the chieftain, and had married Sehoy III after the death of her first husband, Tory Col. John Tate, in the summer of 1780. Sehoy III was of mixed Creek, French and possibly Scottish descent. As the Creek had a matrilineal kinship system, Sehoy III's children were considered born into her clan. (Note: Sehoy III's children had her clan status, the same as her male clan relatives. In this kinship system, property and other inheritance were passed through the maternal line, and a boy's maternal uncle was more essential to his upbringing than his biological father.) Charles Weatherford had a trading post near the Creek village, built a plantation, raised thoroughbred horses for racing, and contributed to his family as a trader.

Benjamin Hawkins, first appointed as United States Indian agent in the Southeast and then as Superintendent of Indian Affairs in the territory south of the Ohio River, lived among the Creek and Choctaw, and knew them well. He commented in letters to President Thomas Jefferson that Creek women were matriarchs and had control of the children "when connected with a white man." Hawkins observed that almost all of the traders, some wealthy, were likewise as "inattentive to their children as the Indians". As Griffith explains (based on John R. Swanton), the lack of fatherly concern was not an "unnatural indifference," given the Creek culture and clan kinship system, and which established a closer relationship of children to their mother's eldest brother (more so than with their biological father).

As a boy William Weatherford was called "Billy". After he showed his skill as a warrior, he was given the "war name" of Hopnicafutsahia, or "Truth Teller." He was the great-grandson of Captain Jean Marchand, the French commanding officer of Fort Toulouse, and Sehoy I, a Creek of the Wind clan.On his mother's side, he was a nephew of the mixed-race Creek chief, Alexander McGillivray, who was prominent in the Upper Creek towns.

Through his mother's family, Weatherford was a cousin of William McIntosh, who became a chief of the Lower Creek towns. The Lower Creek, who comprised the majority of population, lived closer to the European Americans and had intermarried with them, adopting more of their ways, as well as connecting to the market economy.

== Career ==
Weatherford learned traditional Creek ways and language from his mother and her clan, as well as English from his father. As a young man, he acquired a plantation in the Upper Creek territory, where he owned slaves, planted commercial crops, and bred and raced horses as did his father. He generally had good relations with both the Creek nationals and European Americans for years. He worried about the increasing number of the latter, who were encroaching on Creek land.

The Creek of the Lower Towns were becoming more assimilated, but the traditional elders and the people of the Upper Creek towns were more isolated from the European-American settlers. They kept more traditional ways and opposed the new settlements. Weatherford and other Upper Creek leaders resented the encroachment of settlers into their traditional Creek territory, principally in what the United States of America called the Mississippi Territory, which included their territory in present-day Alabama.

After the Americans improved the Trading Path as the National Road in 1811, more American settlers came into the hunting territory and laid claim to homesteads. Various bands of Creeks, especially among the Upper Creek, resisted in a number of armed conflicts. But most of the more assimilated Lower Creek towns were forced to make land concessions to the United States in 1790, 1802, and 1805.

The Lower Creek were among the Five Civilized Tribes who adopted some European-American style farming practices and other customs. As a result, most of the Creek managed to continue as independent communities while slowly becoming almost indistinguishable from other frontier families. The Upper Creek towns resisted the changes in the territory. In these debates, Weatherford counseled neutrality in the rise of hostilities. Conflict broke out within the Creek Nation between those who were adapting to assimilation and those trying to maintain the traditional leadership.

Leaders of the Upper Creek began diplomatic overtures with Spanish and British colonial officials to develop allies against the United States. In the debates in Creek councils, those advocating resistance ("war") rather than cooperation or assimilation became known as Red Sticks, and they soon became the dominant faction in Creek politics, which were highly decentralized. Red Stick bands went to Spanish Florida to purchase arms.

Americans learned that the Red Sticks were bringing back arms from Florida. Hastily organizing a militia, American frontiersmen intercepted and attacked a Red Stick party at Burnt Corn Creek. The latter were returning to the Upper Creek towns with arms purchased in Pensacola in present-day Florida. While the Alabama militia tried to secure the arms and ammunition in the Indian baggage train, the Red Sticks regrouped and fought off the Americans. In reaction to the United States attack on its men, the Creek "declared war" on the United States. Already involved in the War of 1812 against the US, the British encouraged the Creek resistance.

Weatherford joined the Red Sticks along the frontier, where they tried to repulse American settlers from Creek territory. In late August 1813, with Peter McQueen and other Red Sticks, Weatherford participated in a retaliatory attack on Fort Mims. It was a hastily built civilian stockade on the lower Alabama River, about 35 miles north of Mobile. Frontier American families and Lower Creek had retreated to the fort, which was ineptly guarded. The Red Sticks gained entry into the fort and massacred the Lower Creek, as well as European-American settlers, including women and children. Estimates are that they killed up to 500 persons. Some 35 individuals survived. As a prominent leader, Weatherford was held responsible for the massacre, although there are reports he tried to prevent it.

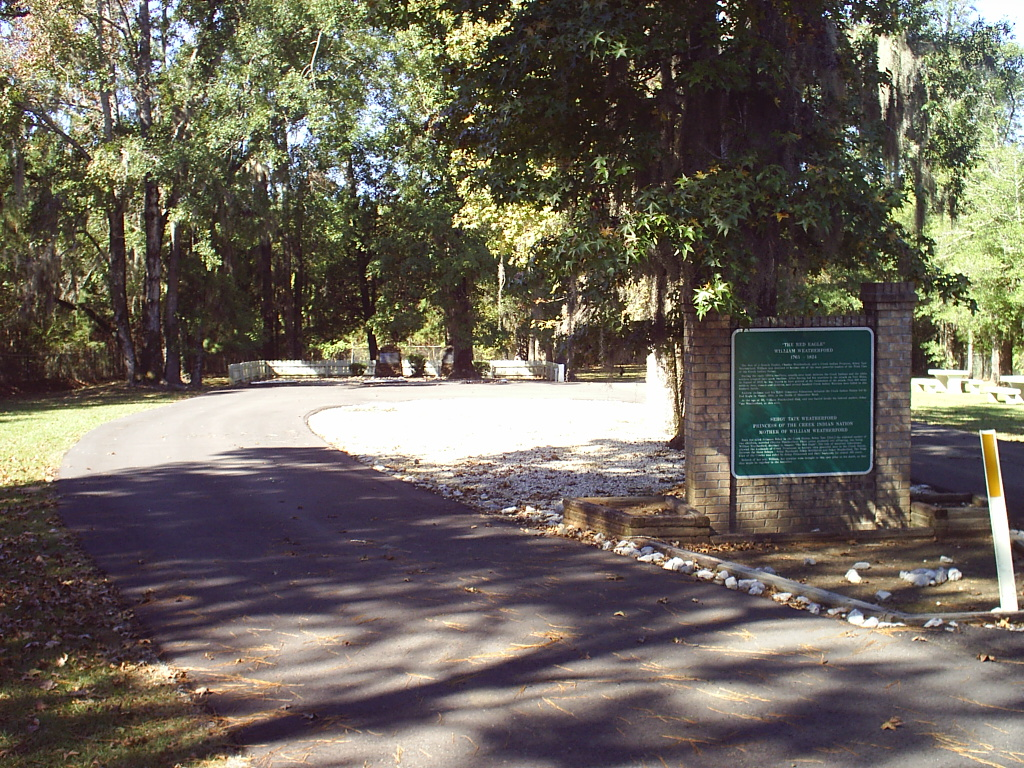
Burial sites of Sehoy III and William Weatherford, with a historical marker in foreground

An Alabama militia followed up with another Ranger unit and maneuvered the Red Sticks into battle at the Battle of Holy Ground. Weatherford barely escaped capture, jumping from a bluff into the Alabama River while on horseback. Having repelled the Red Stick invasion in a number of skirmishes and forced them on the defensive, the Americans regrouped for a final offensive.

The federal government did not have forces to spare. Major General Andrew Jackson led a combined army of state militia from Tennessee, Georgia, and Alabama. Jackson's army finally isolated the main Red Stick Army along with hundreds of American hostages. Weatherford may have played a decisive role in rallying his forces and trying to save the hostages from death. In the finale of the Battle of Horseshoe Bend, Weatherford's rapid responses allowed various small bands of Red Sticks to regroup and fight a rear guard action, but the remainder of the Red Sticks were destroyed. Although the majority of the American hostages were saved, the retreating Red Sticks killed dozens of them.

Meanwhile, Weatherford and some other 200 Red Sticks escaped. Most of the Red Sticks retreated to Florida, where they joined the Seminole people, who had developed from Creek migrants and remnants of other tribes in the 18th century. Weatherford surrendered at Fort Jackson (formerly Fort Toulouse). Jackson spared Weatherford's life and used his influence and knowledge of Creek language to bring the other Upper Creek chiefs to a peace conference.

Weatherford negotiated a new peace through a new treaty with the US; although he had to accept a permanent reduction in Creek territory, he gained retention of most of their territory, including areas where they had homes. Weatherford subsequently moved to the southern part of Monroe County, Alabama, where he rebuilt his wealth as a planter. He died there in 1824. A decade later, the US forced removal of most of the Creek and other Indians from the Southeast to west of the Mississippi River in Indian Territory (now Kansas and Oklahoma).

== Marriage and family ==
William Weatherford married Mary Moniac (c. 1783 – 1804), who was also of mixed race. They had two children, Charles and Mary (Polly) Weatherford. After Mary's death, Weatherford married Sopethlina Kaney Thelotco Moniac (c. 1783 – 1813). She died after the birth of their son, William Weatherford, Jr., born 25 December 1813. About 1817, Weatherford married Mary Stiggins (c. 1783–1832), who was of Natchez and English heritage. They also had children, Alexander McGillivray Weatherford, Mary Levitia Weatherford, Major Weatherford, and John Weatherford.

Weatherford's nephew, David Moniac, son of his sister Elizabeth Weatherford, was the first Native American graduate of the United States Military Academy.

William Weatherford may have been a blood relative of the Shawnee Tecumseh and Tenskwatawa whose mother and father were of Creek and Shawnee lineages. Their relationship may have been the foundation of the strong alliance between Chief Red Eagle and Chief Tecumseh during the Indian Wars.
