= Fort Montgomery (Alabama) =

United States historic site in Alabama

- Tensaw, Alabama in United States

Site information
- Type: Stockade fort
- Owner: Private
- Controlled by: Private
- Open to the public: No

Location
- Location within Alabama Location within the United States
- Coordinates: 31°09′20″N 87°48′32″W

Site history
- Built: August 1814
- Built by: United States Army
- In use: 1814–1818
- Battles/wars: War of 1812; Creek War, Battle of Pensacola; First Seminole War

Fort Montgomery was a stockade fort built in August 1814 in present-day Baldwin County, Alabama (then Mississippi Territory), during the Creek War, which was part of the larger War of 1812. The fort was built by the United States military in response to attacks by Creek warriors on encroaching American settlers and in preparation for further military action in the War of 1812. Fort Montgomery continued to be used for military purposes but in less than a decade was abandoned. Nothing exists at the site today.

== History ==
=== Background ===
The War of 1812 was fought between the United States and allied Native Americans (including members of the Choctaw, Chickasaw, Cherokee, and Creek tribes) and the United Kingdom, Spain (not initially involved), and various Native American tribes. The war began after increasing tensions caused by territorial expansion of the United States led to the United Kingdom increasing trade restrictions. It initially took place in the northeastern part of the United States and southeastern Canada, but eventually came to include conflicts in the southeastern United States and Spanish West Florida.

The Creek War began in 1813 after two rival factions of the Creek tribe fought over various issues, including the creation of a centralized Creek government. Supporters of the Creek national government were accepting of the "civilization" efforts of the young American government, including subsistence farming. The rival faction, known as the Red Sticks, opposed a centralized Creek government. The Red Sticks were further emboldened by the recent visit of the Shawnee warrior Tecumseh and his calls for the resistance to expansion of American settlers on Native American land. The United States became involved in the Creek War in hopes of preventing the Red Sticks from allying themselves with the United Kingdom. Andrew Jackson commanded Army soldiers, militia, and allied Native Americans against the Red Sticks. After the Treaty of Fort Jackson the Creek War essentially concluded, but sporadic fighting continued in the area north of Mobile and Spanish West Florida. Spies had reported back to Jackson of the presence of British troops in Pensacola and of the fact that Red Sticks were being armed by the British in their continued fight against the United States. Jackson then planned an invasion of Pensacola to prevent the supplying of weapons, culminating in the Battle of Pensacola.

After the close of the Creek War, Jackson defeated a British attack on New Orleans and the subsequent signing of the Treaty of Ghent signaled the end of the War of 1812. Some of the Red Sticks fled into Florida and allied themselves with runaway slaves and members of the Seminole tribe. In response to Seminole retaliatory attacks on American settlers, Jackson then led an invasion of Spanish Florida in what became known as the First Seminole War.

=== Construction ===
After the Treaty of Fort Jackson, Jackson sent a large force of troops to the southern portion of the Mississippi Territory to allow for greater protection of settlers in the area around the Mobile River and southern Alabama River and to prepare for further military action in the War of 1812. A section of this force came down the Alabama River and a separate group marched down the Federal Road towards Fort Stoddert under the command of General John Coffee, who was serving as Jackson's chief of staff. In August 1814, a detachment of troops under Colonel Thomas Hart Benton began construction of a new fort on Holmes Hill (a high sand hill that was chosen due to the fact it had multiple surrounding freshwater springs), near the present-day community of Tensaw. They were also joined by the 44th Infantry Regiment, who came from Kentucky under the command of William Orlando Butler. The fort was constructed to serve as a supply base for Jackson's further military action in the War of 1812 and was named for Lemuel P. Montgomery, a friend of Jackson's who was killed at the Battle of Horseshoe Bend. Fort Montgomery was built over the next two months by members of the 3rd Infantry, 39th Infantry, and 44th Infantry. Typical of other contemporary stockades, Fort Montgomery was built in a star shape, had 14-foot high log walls, a moat, and a blockhouse. The blockhouse was three stories tall and covered with hard logs and pine tar. In addition, it was defended by four 6-pounder guns placed on top of the blockhouse. After construction was completed, the headquarters of the 7th Military District was relocated from Fort Stoddert to Fort Montgomery.

=== War of 1812 ===
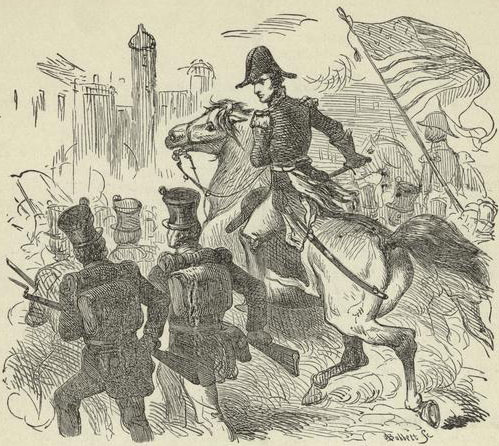
Jackson and his soldiers entering Pensacola on November 6, 1814

While Fort Montgomery was under construction, Coffee camped with 2,800 men on the western side of the Tombigbee River, near the Alabama Cut-Off. After the Battle of Fort Bowyer, Jackson (who was headquartered at Fort Pierce), sent Colonel Arthur P. Hayne to Fort Montgomery to organize troops in preparation for an assault on Pensacola, where the British had fled. Jackson demanded the Governor of West Florida, Mateo González Manrique, to evict the Red Sticks from his territory and to stop harboring British soldiers in Pensacola. González Manrique remained silent on his decision, which led to Jackson invading Pensacola without any direct order in the Battle of Pensacola. Jackson's force of 4,100 men consisted of militia and 2,000 volunteers, supplemented by 520 regulars and 750 Choctaw and Chickasaw warriors. Davy Crockett was among the volunteers from Tennessee who arrived at Fort Montgomery to participate in the attack on Pensacola. After the Battle of Pensacola, Jackson returned to Fort Montgomery, then subsequently traveled to Mobile prior to the Battle of New Orleans. After returning to Fort Montgomery, Crockett and other volunteers killed cattle that had become wild after the Fort Mims massacre.

Following the Battle of Pensacola, Jackson was concerned Red Stick warriors would flee to the British Post at Prospect Bluff, join the British, then capture Fort Jackson and sever his supply line. Jackson ordered Brigadier General James Winchester to Fort Montgomery, along with soldiers from General Nathaniel Taylor's Brigade (which was also stationed at Fort Claiborne), Colonel Philip Pipkin's 1st Regiment West Tennessee Militia, a battalion of Major Thomas Hinds' Mississippi Dragoons, and militia from Fort Madison. These were further reinforced by the 2nd Infantry, 3rd Infantry, companies of the 24th and 39th Infantries, 2,500 soldiers from Georgia, and 2,000 from East Tennessee. It was originally planned for this combined force to search West Florida for Red Sticks and provide reinforcements to Jackson at New Orleans. After the Battle of Pensacola, Crockett and some volunteers under the command of William Russell participated in the search for remaining Red Sticks north of Pensacola. The volunteers then reached Apalachicola before marching to Fort Decatur.

On December 8, 1814, Major Uriah Blue was commanded to lead troops in hunting down any remaining Red Stick warriors who remained in the area of the Escambia and Yellow Rivers. Jackson planned to reinforce Blue's command with soldiers from Georgia, but these reinforcements never arrived. Blue led 1,000 Choctaw, Chickasaw (under the command of William Colbert), allied Creek, and Tennessee volunteers to search for any remaining Red Sticks. Due to wet roads, Blue's force was unable to use wagons to transport supplies and was forced to use pack horses to navigate the muddy terrain. Blue remained in the field for one month with only 20 days of rations, attacking at least one camp and sending back any captured men, women, or children to Fort Montgomery. Blue returned to Fort Montgomery on January 9, 1815, and sometime after his arrival, Fort Montgomery became the headquarters for the newly organized 7th Infantry. At this time, 421 soldiers were stationed at Fort Montgomery. The original fort was then demolished and the site also became known as Camp Montgomery. Barracks were built of round logs and a hospital was constructed under the direction of Thomas Lawson.

Jackson continued to keep troops at Fort Montgomery to protect against any possible movement by the British on Pascagoula that would cut off his supply line to New Orleans, to prevent possible British excursions against Mobile, to provide reinforcements to any attack on Fort Bowyer, and to keep any remaining British troops at Pensacola in check.

=== First Seminole War ===
After the conclusion of the War of 1812, Red Stick warriors continued to join members of the Seminole tribe in attacking American settlers. In response to these attacks, Major General Edmund P. Gaines ordered Major David E. Twiggs to set out from Fort Montgomery and establish a new post on the Conecuh River, which was subsequently named Fort Crawford. Regular supply ships to Fort Crawford were not allowed up the Conecuh River by the Spanish governor of West Florida, José Masot, unless they paid duties to the Kingdom of Spain. In response, Fort Crawford was supplied by regular excursions from Fort Montgomery.

In February 1817, the 4th Infantry Regiment was transferred from Fort Scott and Fort Gadsden to Fort Montgomery. By October of the same year, troops were being transferred back to Fort Scott from Fort Montgomery. In the latter part of 1817, Fort Montgomery became part of the 8th Military District and was under the command of Lieutenant Colonel Matthew Arbuckle Jr. Command was later handed over to Lieutenant Colonel William A. Trimble.

In May 1817, an advance party of the Vine and Olive Colony stopped at Fort Stoddert, then arrived at Fort Montgomery to meet with General Gaines. In November 1817, a minister, Aaron Booge, established a church and school at Fort Montgomery.

After the First Seminole War began, Red Stick warriors continued to gather near Pensacola. In a letter to Secretary of War John C. Calhoun, Jackson reported settlers near Fort Montgomery had been fortifying their homes after receiving news of attacks by Red Sticks on citizens near Fort Claiborne and the Sepulga River. The warriors were supplied by British weapons obtained in Pensacola, as the Spanish had allowed the British to land there. Jackson felt the Spanish authorities did not have proper control over these "hostiles", so he planned to capture Pensacola and establish American rule over the city to prevent further attacks by Red Sticks. In preparation for an assault on Pensacola, Jackson ordered artillery secretly moved to Fort Montgomery under a Colonel Sands. The artillery from Fort Montgomery and soldiers from Fort Crawford met Jackson at a rendezvous point near the Escambia River. This combined force then marched on Pensacola and occupied it on May 24 without resistance after the Spanish surrendered Fort San Carlos de Barrancas. Adjutant General Robert Butler commanded Tennessee Volunteers back to Fort Montgomery, taking with them arms and weapons captured in Pensacola. After the occupation of Pensacola, Jackson moved his headquarters to Fort Montgomery.

=== Further military use ===
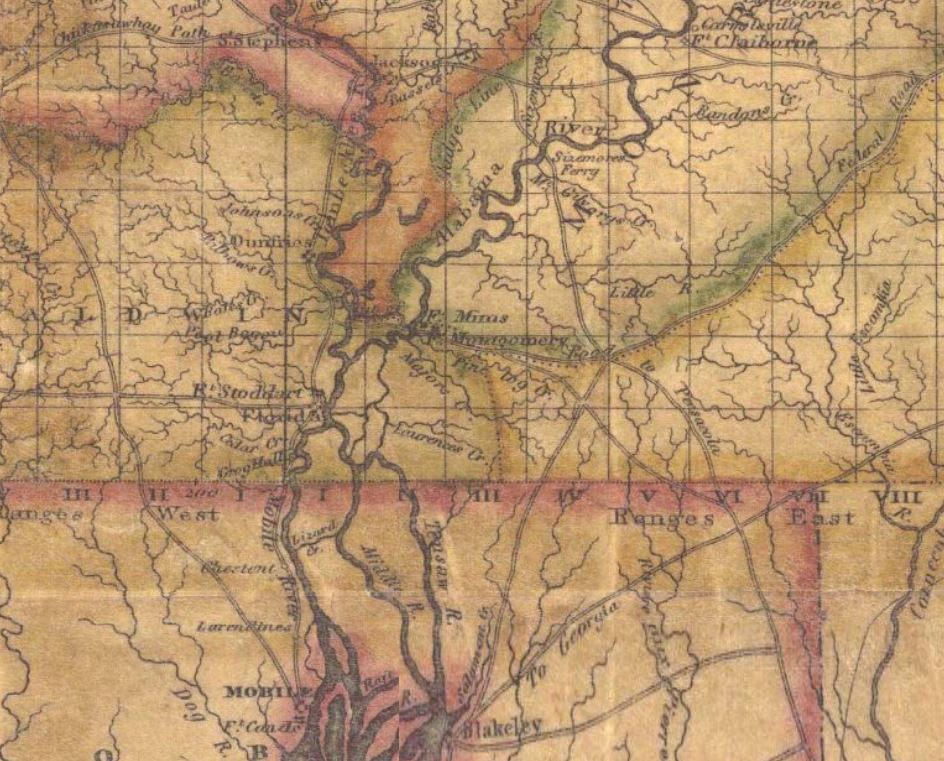
John Melish's 1818 map showing Fort Montgomery (located in the center) and other contemporary forts.

In July 1818, Alabama Territory settlers captured and killed five Red Stick warriors who were being transported on the Federal Road from Fort Claiborne to Fort Montgomery. This attack caused other Creeks who remained in the area to flee their homes.

The headquarters of the 8th Military District remained at Fort Montgomery until 1818, after which they were moved two miles northeast on the Federal Road to Cantonment Montpelier. The court martial of acting Florida governor William King took place at Montpelier, Alabama in November 1819.

In addition to United States Army soldiers, the 3rd and 4th Regiment of East Tennessee Militia, 2nd Regiment West Tennessee Militia, East Tennessee Mounted Gunmen, Separate Battalion of Volunteer Mounted Gunmen, and Separate Battalion of West Tennessee Militia were all stationed at Fort Montgomery at various times.

=== Postwar ===
Fort Montgomery was located on a post road that traveled from Fort Claiborne to Blakeley, Alabama.

A community known as Montgomery or Montgomery Hill developed around the site of Fort Montgomery. A post office operated under the name Fort Montgomery from 1816 to 1818.

Nothing remains at the site of Fort Montgomery today. Relic hunters have destroyed some of the contemporary site. Archaeological investigations have been led by Jefferson Davis Community College with funding by the Alabama Historical Commission. No definitive identification of fort walls has been made, but multiple military artifacts have been recovered. A large number of buttons were discovered during the investigation, likely due to the reorganization of Army units in March 1815.

== Sources ==
- Brannon, Peter A. (1924). "Montgomery Hill". Arrow Points: Monthly Bulletin of the Alabama Anthropological Society. 8 (5).
- Braund, Kathryn; Waselkov, Gregory; Christopher, Raven (2019). The Old Federal Road in Alabama. Tuscaloosa, Alabama: University of Alabama Press. ISBN 978-0-8173-5930-0.
- Fredriksen, John C. (1999). American Military Leaders: A–L. Vol. I. Santa Barbara, California: ABC-CLIO. ISBN 1-57607-001-8.
- Hammond, John Martin (1915). Quaint and Historic Forts of North America. Philadelphia, Pennsylvania: J. B. Lippincott Company.
- Harris, W. Stuart (1977). Dead Towns of Alabama. Tuscaloosa, Alabama: University of Alabama Press. ISBN 0-8173-1125-4.
- Ingersoll, L. D. (1879). A History of the War Department of the United States, with Biographical Sketches of the Secretaries. Washington, D. C.: Francis B. Mohun.
- Jackson, Andrew (1927). Bassett, John Spencer (ed.). Correspondence of Andrew Jackson. Vol. 2. Washington, D.C.: Carnegie Institution of Washington.
- Jones, Randell (2006). In the Footsteps of Davy Crockett. Winston-Salem, North Carolina: John F. Blair. ISBN 978-0-89587-324-8.
- Lowrie, Walter; Clarke, Matthew St. Clair, eds. (1832). American State Papers. Vol. 2. Washington, D.C.: Gales and Seaton.
- Owen, Thomas McAdory (1921). History of Alabama and Dictionary of Alabama Biography. Vol. 2. Chicago, Illinois: S. J. Clarke Publishing Company.
- Owsley, Frank Lawrence Jr. (2008). Struggle for the Gulf Borderlands. Gainesville, Florida: Library Press@UF. ISBN 978-1-947372-34-4.
- Parker, Jim (2012). "Investigations Relative to the 19th Century Tensaw Military Frontier in Southwest Alabama" (PDF). Escambia Echoes. 39 (6).
- Pickett, Albert James (1878). History of Alabama, and Incidentally of Georgia and Mississippi, from the Earliest Period. Tuscaloosa, Alabama: Willo Publishing Company. ISBN 978-1-363-31084-5.
- Waselkov, Gregory; Christopher, Raven (2012). Archaeological Survey of the Old Federal Road in Alabama (Technical report). Montgomery, Alabama: Alabama Department of Transportation. "Submitted by the Center for Archaeological Studies University of South Alabama."
- Waselkov, Gregory (2012). "Chapter 8: Fort Jackson and the Aftermath". In Braund, Kathryn E. Holland (ed.). Tohopeka: Rethinking the Creek War & the War of 1812. Tuscaloosa, Alabama: University of Alabama Press. ISBN 978-0-8173-5711-5.
