= Colonel John Williams House =

Historic house in Tennessee, United States

- Col. John Williams House
- U.S. National Register of Historic Places
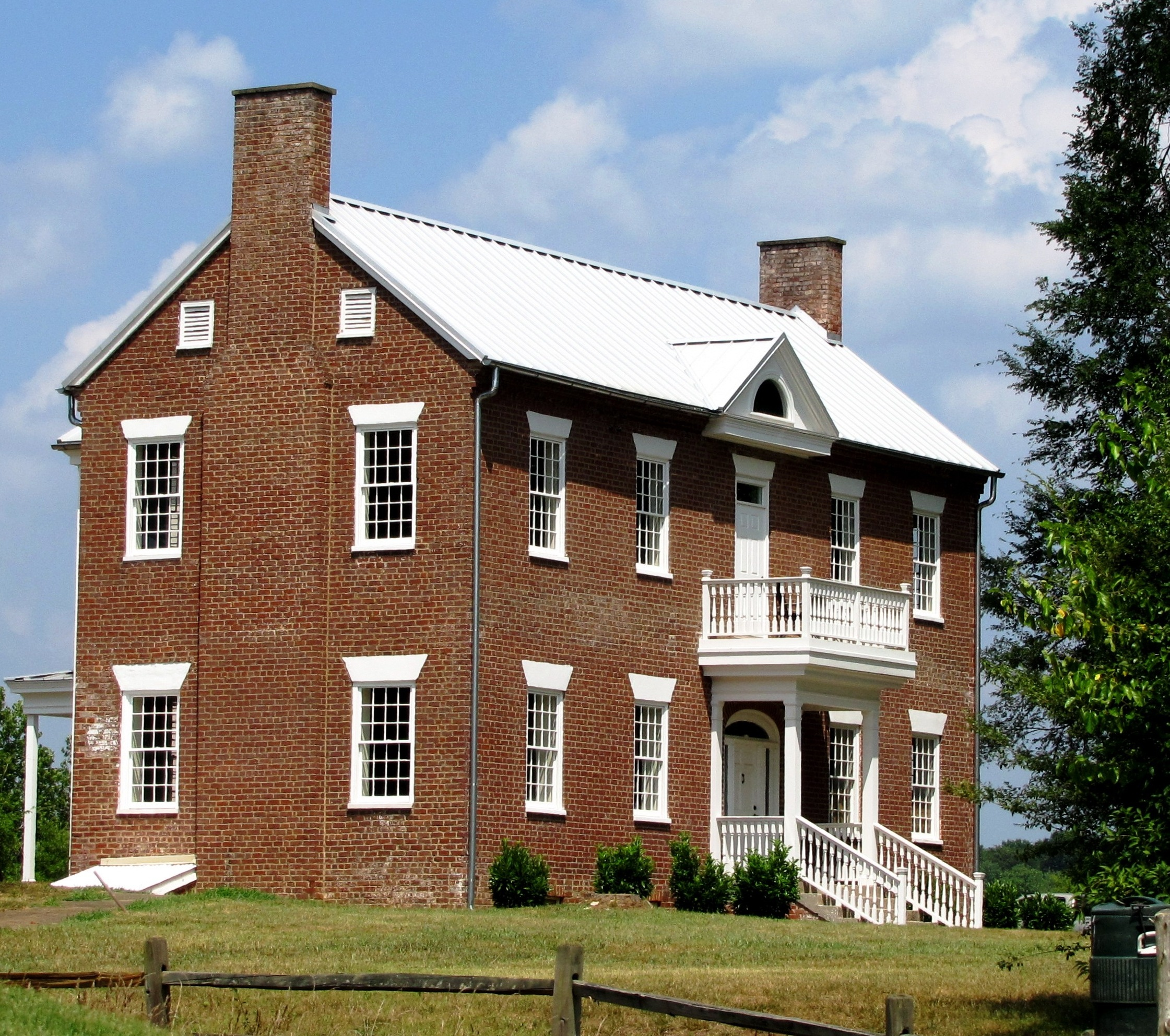

- Location within Tennessee Location within the United States
- Location: 2333 Dandridge Ave. Knoxville, Tennessee
- Coordinates: 35°58′17″N 83°53′8″W
- Area: 5.2 acres (2.1 ha)
- Built: 1826
- Architect: Melinda White Williams
- Architectural style: Federal
- NRHP reference No.: 80003843
- Added to NRHP: December 3, 1980

The Colonel John Williams House in Knoxville, Tennessee, United States, was built in 1825–1826 by the slaves of Melinda White Williams, wife of Colonel John Williams, while he was away serving as Chargé d'Affaires to Guatemala for President John Quincy Adams. (Melinda White was a daughter of Knoxville's founder, James White.) The home is designed in the Federal style, with a noteworthy pediment with a fanlight at the roofline.

Col. Williams was originally from Surry County, North Carolina. He was the fourth son of Colonel Joseph and Rebekah Lanier Williams. He served as Tennessee's Attorney General from 1807 to 1808, was a U.S. Senator representing Tennessee from 1815 to 1823 and was the hero of the Battle of Horseshoe Bend in 1814 (Jackson's first military victory.) His Senate career ended in 1823, when General Andrew Jackson won the seat. Colonel Williams also served as a trustee of East Tennessee College (now the University of Tennessee). Colonel Williams died in 1837, and Melinda died eight months later. Both are buried in the First Presbyterian Church Cemetery.

The house and property were sold to Abner Jackson, co-owner of A.G. Jackson & Company, a dry goods store, in 1855. He owned the house until his death in 1869. Beginning in 1883 it was leased to the state of Tennessee for use as the Colored Deaf and Dumb School. The state purchased the building in 1885, and enlarged it.

It was rehabbed by the state in both 1923 and 1948. In the latter it was turned into classrooms for students and was last used in approximately 1982. For many years it was vacant while adjoining buildings were used for the Sertoma Learning Center.

After asbestos was found in those other buildings, Sertoma moved to other quarters and the state abandoned the property in 1991. The property was purchased by descendants of the former owners in 1998 and has been restored. The house and some of the original acreage is owned by The First Tee of Greater Knoxville which operates an 18-hole par 3 golf facility, named Williams Creek Golf Course .

In 1842, Williams' son, also known as "Colonel John Williams", built another Federal-style brick house in the vicinity that still stands, the Williams-Richards House at 2225 Riverside Drive.
