= Williams–Richards House =

Coordinates: 35.969°N 83.887°W

The Williams–Richards House (also known as Marbledale and Colonial Hall) is located at 2225 Riverside in Knoxville, Tennessee. Originally built as a one-story Federal style home in 1842 by John C. J. Williams, it included the main home and slave quarters. In 1850, it was recorded that the plantation included Williams' wife and family of three children and 12 slaves. The home originally faced Dandridge Avenue. In 1899, the house was extensively remodeled after purchased by the Richards family, including the addition of a second story using bricks from the original slave quarters and the Riverside Drive Neoclassical front. At this time it was renamed Colonial Hall and was featured on china and postcards as late as 1910.

John C. J. Williams II was the son of John Williams (Tennessee politician) and the grandson of General James White, the founder of Knoxville. His fathers home, the Colonel John Williams House, is located a quarter-mile to the north on Dandridge Avenue. John C. J. Williams II is the playwright Tennessee Williams's great-grandfather. He reportedly entertained such dignitaries as President Andrew Johnson. The house is significant for both phases of its architecture, and for its historical associations.
