= Lemuel P. Montgomery =

American military officer (1786–1814)

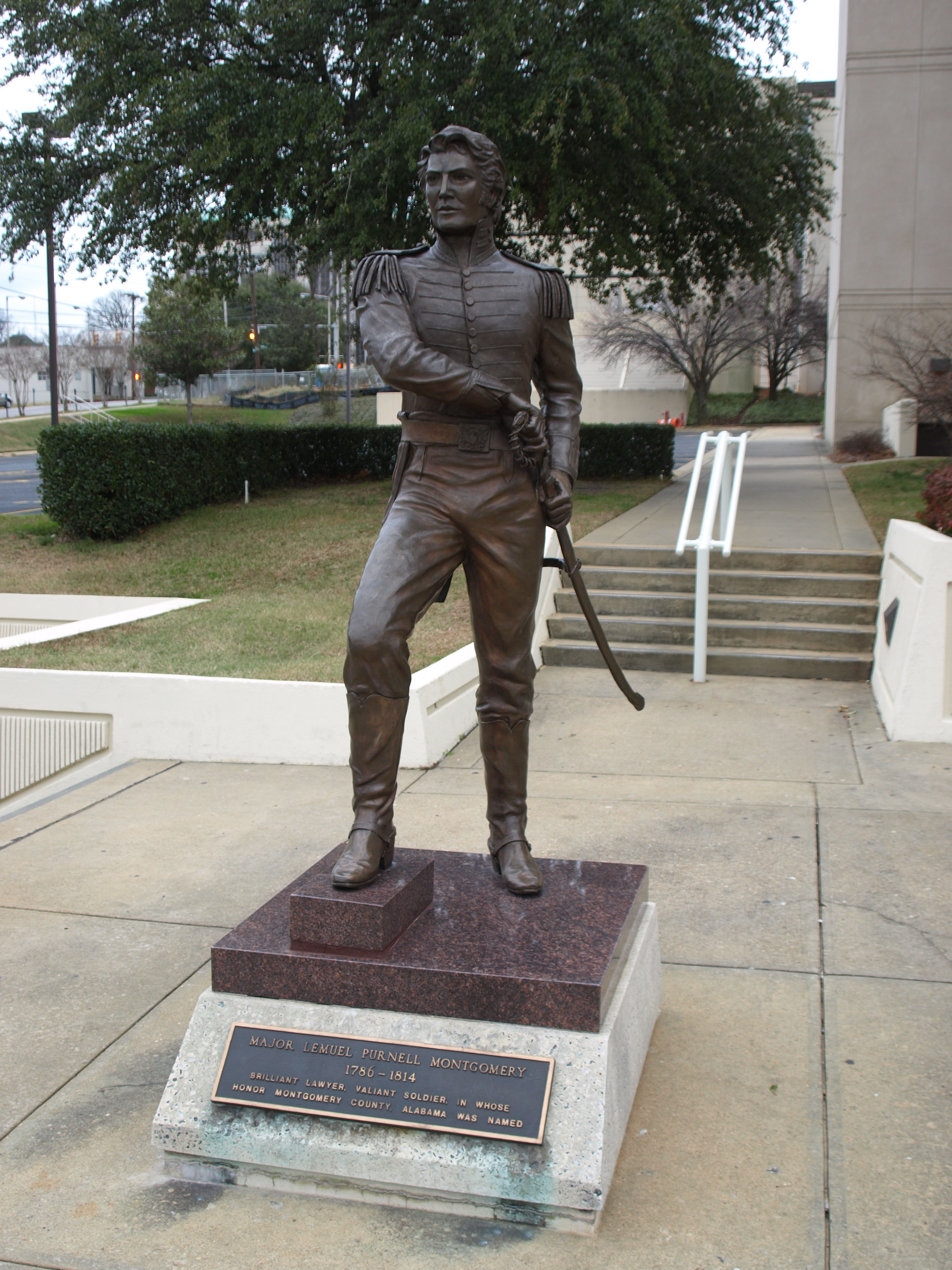
A statue of Major Montgomery at the Montgomery County courthouse.

Lemuel Purnell Montgomery (c. 1786 – March 27, 1814) was an American military officer who fought in the Creek War. Montgomery was an attorney in Nashville, Tennessee, when the War of 1812 broke out, and was commissioned as a major of the 39th Infantry. He was killed in the Battle of Horseshoe Bend, at the conclusion of the Creek War, on March 27, 1814. He reportedly "led the charge on the breast-works at the Horseshoe, and was killed on the ramparts."

In all likelihood, Lemuel Montgomery was the namesake of Fort Montgomery, which was established the same year that he died, two miles from Fort Mims. In 1816, Montgomery County, Alabama, was named in his honor. About twenty years later, the town and county of Montgomery in Texas were established and named after Montgomery County, Alabama.

Lemuel Montgomery was related to Andrew Jackson by marriage. Jackson had known Lemuel's father Hugh Montgomery since the 1780s, and Lemuel's mother Ephemia Purnell Montgomery was sister to Jackson's sister-in-law Mary Purnell Donelson.
