= Tensaw, Alabama =

Unincorporated community in Alabama, United States

Tensaw
- Unincorporated community
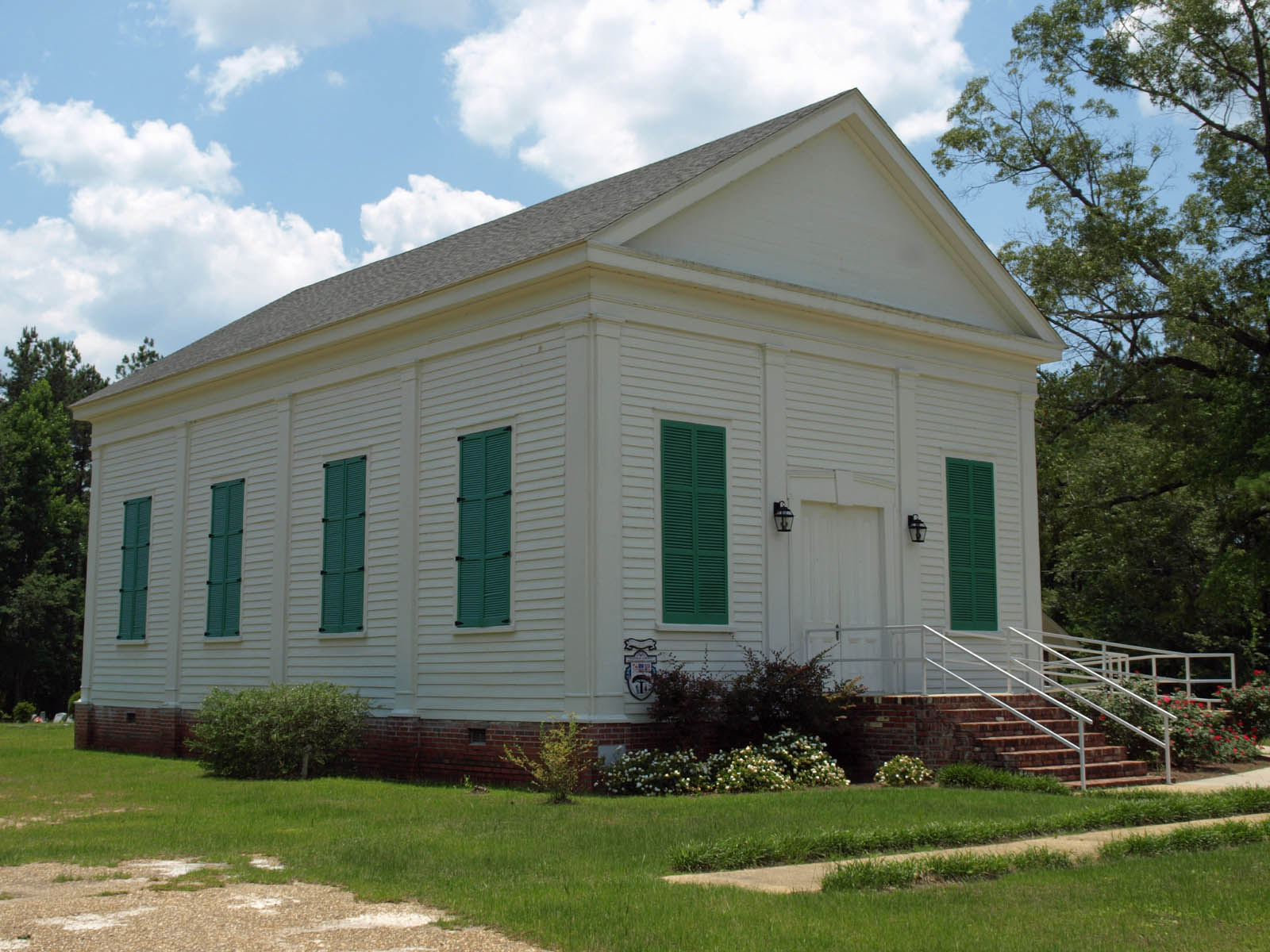
- Montgomery Hill Baptist Church

- Location within the state of Alabama Tensaw (the United States)
- Coordinates: 31°09′25″N 87°47′57″W
- Country: United States
- State: Alabama
- County: Baldwin
- Elevation: 141 ft (43 m)
- Time zone: UTC-6 (Central (CST))
  - Summer (DST): UTC-5 (CDT)
- GNIS feature ID: 157149

Tensaw is an unincorporated community in Baldwin County, Alabama, United States. It is part of the Daphne–Fairhope–Foley Micropolitan Statistical Area and is the home of historic Fort Mims.

The name Tensaw is derived from the historic indigenous Taensa people. A post office operated under the name Tensaw from 1807 to 1953.

Three former stockade forts used during the Creek War (part of the War of 1812), were located near Tensaw: Fort Mims (site of the Fort Mims massacre), Fort Montgomery, and Fort Pierce.

== Gallery ==
Below are structures that were located in Tensaw that were recorded in the Historic American Buildings Survey:

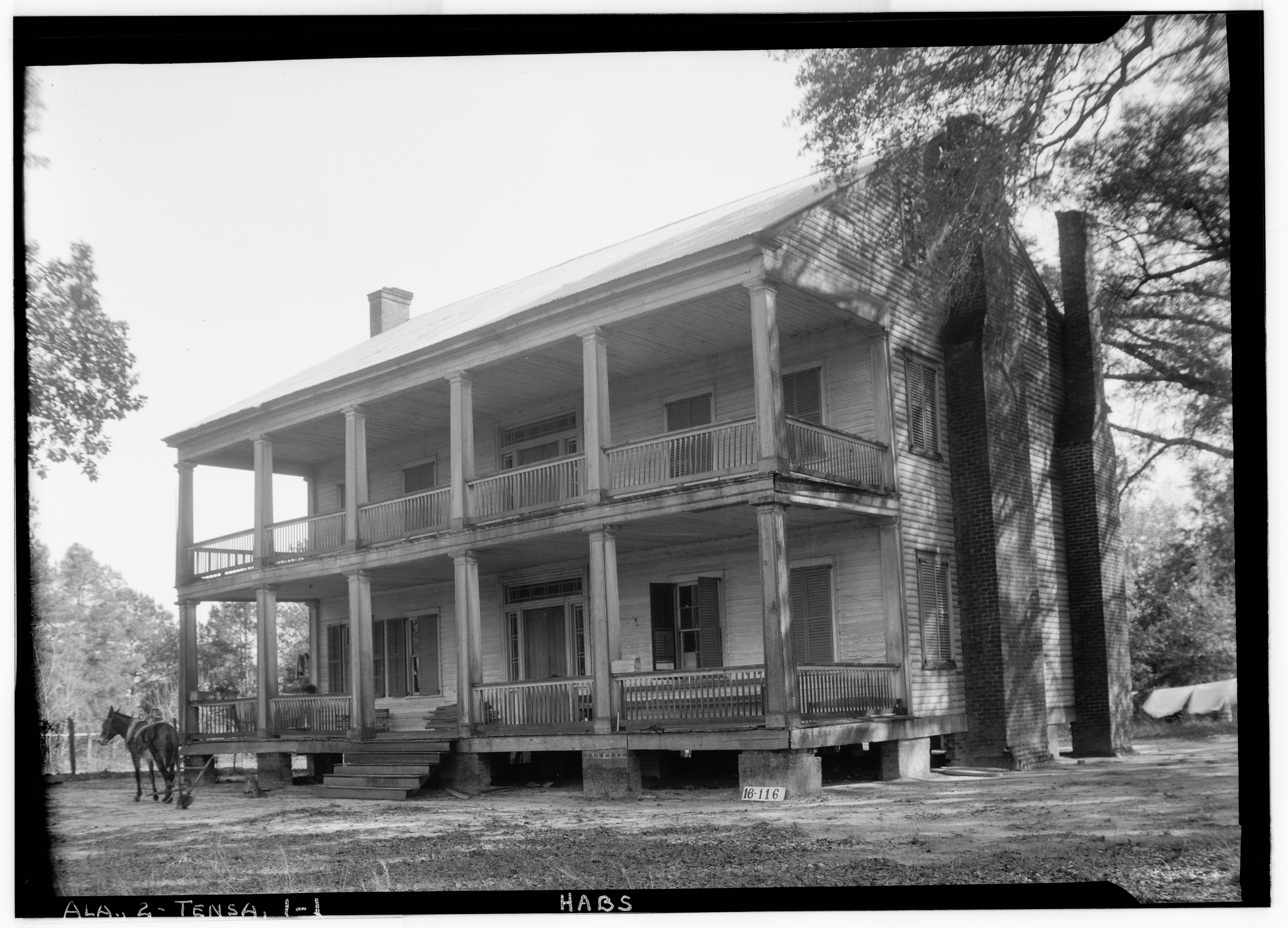
Atkinson-Till House

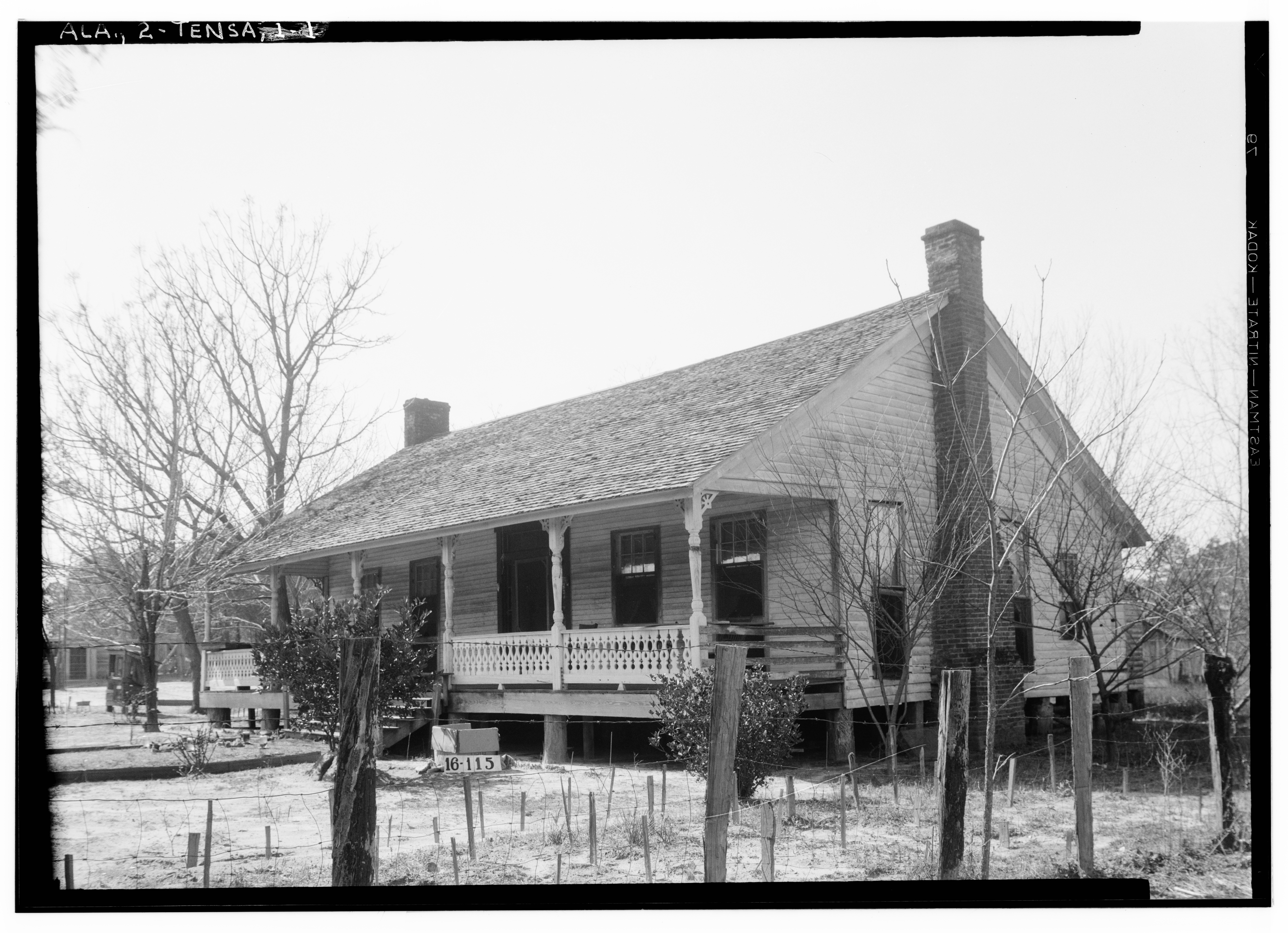
Tunstall House
