= Anderson Mitchell =

American politician

Member of the North Carolina Senate
- In office 1860

Member of the North Carolina House of Representatives
- In office 1852–1854

Member of the U.S. House of Representatives from North Carolina's 13th district
- In office April 27, 1842 – March 3, 1843
- Preceded by: Lewis Williams
- Succeeded by: Brad Miller (2003) (Note: District inactive: March 4, 1843 – January 3, 2003)

Personal details
- Born: June 13, 1800 Milton, North Carolina, U.S.
- Died: December 24, 1876 (aged 76) Statesville, North Carolina, U.S.
- Party: Whig
- Education: University of North Carolina at Chapel Hill

Anderson Mitchell (June 13, 1800 – December 24, 1876) was a U.S. representative from North Carolina.

Mitchell was born on a farm near Milton, North Carolina. He first attended Bingham's School, Orange County, North Carolina, and later studied law at the University of North Carolina at Chapel Hill until his graduation in 1821. After being admitted to the bar, he commenced practice in Morganton, North Carolina in 1830. Mitchell moved to Jefferson in 1831 and to Wilkesboro in 1835. In the meantime, he served as court clerk of the superior court of Ashe County.

Being elected to fill the vacancy created by the death of Lewis Williams, Mitchell, a member of the Whig party, served in the Twenty-seventh Congress from April 27, 1842, to March 3, 1843. He was unsuccessful in a reelection campaign in 1842 for the Twenty-eighth Congress.

Between 1852 and 1854, Mitchell became a member of the State house of commons, and was elected to the State senate in 1860. Furthermore, he was delegate to the State convention of May 20, 1861, that passed the Ordinance of Secession, and voted against secession. In September 1865, he was appointed judge of the superior court by Provisional Governor Holden, where he was subsequently elected and reelected, and served until his resignation on June 30, 1875.

Anderson Mitchell died in Statesville, North Carolina on December 24, 1876 and was buried in the Presbyterian Cemetery.

== See also ==
- Twenty-seventh United States Congress

== Notes ==
U.S. House of Representatives
Preceded by Lewis Williams	Member of the U.S. House of Representatives from North Carolina's 13th congressional district 1842–1843	Succeeded by District inactive
