= Fort Pierce (Alabama) =

United States historic site in Alabama

- Tensaw, Alabama in United States

Site information
- Type: Stockade fort
- Owner: Private
- Controlled by: Private
- Open to the public: No

Location
- Location within Alabama Location within the United States
- Coordinates: 31°08′58″N 87°49′05″W

Site history
- Built: 1813
- Built by: Mississippi Territory settlers
- In use: 1813–1814
- Battles/wars: War of 1812; Creek War, Battle of Pensacola

Fort Pierce (also spelled Peirce (Note: "Peirce" is the proper spelling of the surname of the original builders of the fort. Most contemporary sources used the spelling of "Pierce.") or Pearce and also known as Peirce's Mill or Pierce's Stockade), was two separate stockade forts built in 1813 in present-day Baldwin County, Alabama (then Mississippi Territory), during the Creek War, which was part of the larger War of 1812. The fort was originally built by settlers in the Mississippi Territory to protect themselves from attacks by Creek warriors. A new fort of the same name was then built by the United States military in preparation for further action in the War of 1812, but the fort was essentially abandoned within a few years. Nothing exists at the site today.

== History ==
=== Background ===
The War of 1812 was fought between the United States (along with various allied Native American tribes), and the United Kingdom, Spain (eventually involved), and various Native American tribes. Although the war initially took place in the northeastern part of the United States and southeastern Canada, conflicts soon reached into the southeastern United States and Spanish West Florida.

The Creek War began in 1813 as a regional conflict of the War of 1812. The war initially pitted two rival factions of the Creek tribe against each other: the Red Sticks, who opposed a centralized Creek national government and opposed encroachment of American settlers, versus those who supported a centralized Creek national government and were accepting of European culture (such as subsistence farming). After the Shawnee warrior Tecumseh visited the Creeks in 1811, the Red Sticks embraced the call to oppose American settlers and their culture. The United States entered the Creek War in hopes of preventing the Red Sticks from becoming allied with the United Kingdom. The American military was supported by local militias and allied Native Americans (including Creeks, Choctaws, and Chickasaws), while the Red Sticks were supplied by the United Kingdom and Spain. In retaliation for American involvement, Red Sticks began attacking American settlers. In response, many of the settlers sought refuge in stockades. These stockades were often built around a settler's home and named for the settler who owned the surrounding land or home. The Treaty of Fort Jackson essentially brought the Creek War to a close, but various skirmishes and conflicts between Red Sticks and settlers continued, culminating in the Battle of Pensacola.

=== Construction ===
In the early 1800s, John and William Peirce moved to the area of modern-day Tensaw from New England. William operated one of the first cotton gins in the area, and John founded one of the first recorded schools in what is now Alabama. In 1813, the Peirce brothers constructed a protective stockade around their grist mill and sawmill on Pine Log Creek in response to news of Red Stick attacks on American settlers. This stockade was located about two miles southeast of Fort Mims, which was the protective stockade constructed around the home of Samuel Mims. After the Battle of Burnt Corn Creek, General Ferdinand Claiborne feared the Red Sticks would begin retaliatory attacks on settlers in the area north of Mobile. Claiborne sent soldiers from the Mount Vernon Cantonment to supplement the militias in Fort Glass, Fort Mims, Fort Easley, and eventually, Fort Pierce. By August 1813, the fort was garrisoned by settlers from the surrounding region and was additionally strengthened by Mississippi Territory Volunteers from the area of Natchez under the command of Lieutenant Andrew Montgomery. In addition to the militia and volunteers, local settlers, slaves, and allied Creeks took refuge in Fort Pierce, bringing the total occupants of the fort to around 200 persons.

=== Military use ===
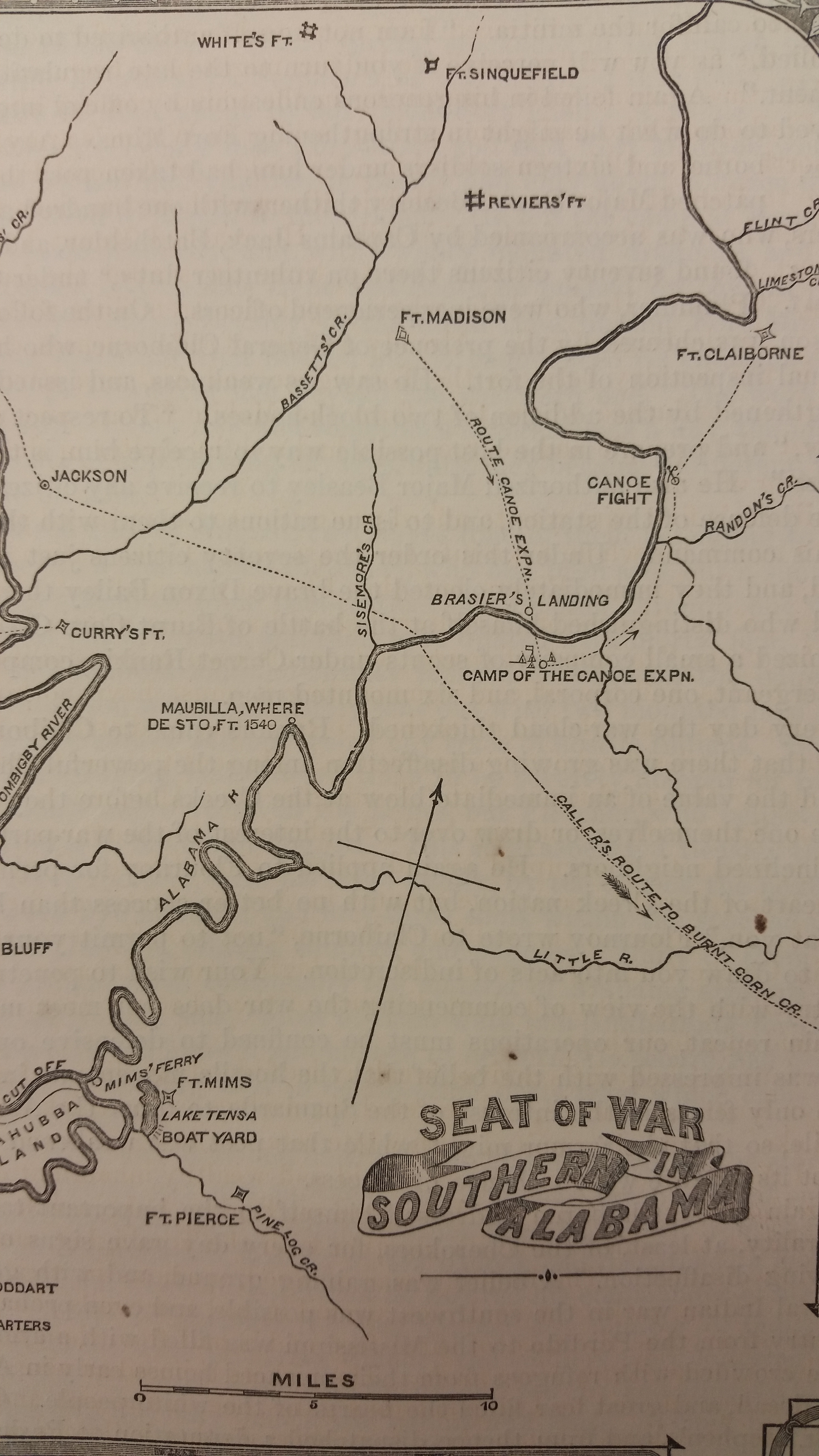
Map of Alabama during the War of 1812. Fort Pierce is located in the bottom left.

After the Battle of Burnt Corn Creek, Red Sticks planned to attack Fort Mims, as some métis who assisted in the American attack had taken refuge inside. The Red Sticks initially planned a simultaneous attack on Fort Pierce along with their attack on Fort Mims. While planning the attacks on Fort Mims and Pierce, William Weatherford was provided information from runaway slaves from Fort Pierce about the Tensaw River forts and their defenses. While en route to Fort Mims, the Red Stick war party was seen by a number of American settlers and slaves. Most of these reported sightings were by occupants of Fort Pierce, which caused the military leadership of Fort Mims to feel that these sightings were falsely reported to ensure Fort Pierce would be supplied with additional military support. Fort Pierce was guarded by soldiers under the command of Lieutenant Montgomery, who had been sent to Fort Pierce from the main body of troops under the command of Major Daniel Beasley at Fort Mims.

On August 30, 1813, an estimated 750 Red Stick warriors attacked Fort Mims in what became known as the Fort Mims massacre. On the morning of the attack, Beasley had received word that Fort Pierce was in imminent danger from Red Stick warriors. Beasley planned to dispatch eight to ten mounted men under Captain Hatton Middleton to determine the strength of the reported Red Stick force. It was falsely assumed Fort Pierce would be attacked prior to Fort Mims because Fort Pierce had lighter defenses. Instead, Fort Mims was attacked by the full force of Red Stick warriors and over 200 settlers, allied Creeks, and soldiers were killed. During the attack, Captain Dixon Bailey attempted to escape and obtain reinforcements from Fort Pierce, but he was prevented from doing so by other settlers in Fort Mims. The attack was heard as far away as Fort Pierce, where Lieutenant Montgomery reported that "the firing and yells of the Indians were distinctly heard at this post until after four o'clock in the afternoon when the firing ceased. It was impossible to render them any assistance from my small force." After their losses in the attack on Fort Mims, the Red Sticks abandoned their plan to attack Fort Pierce.

A few hours after the attack on Fort Mims, four men from Fort Pierce traveled to Fort Mims to observe the aftermath of the massacre. Montgomery then planned to abandon Fort Pierce and flee towards Mobile due to the perceived threat of another Red Stick attack. Montgomery initially decided to take the 40 men and 164 women and children to Mobile via the Alabama River, but remaining Red Stick warriors in the area prevented this route. Fort Pierce's occupants left its protective walls on August 30 and traveled by land to Mobile, arriving three days later. After Fort Pierce was abandoned Red Stick warriors burned the entire structure.

On October 8, 1813, a detachment of the 7th Infantry Regiment from Fort Stoddert under the command of Captain Uriah Blue arrived at the former site of Fort Pierce. The soldiers built a new fort on a hill near Pine Log Creek and named it Fort Pierce, even though it was not in the exact location as the previous Fort Pierce. Blue was commanded to search the surrounding area for any remaining Red Sticks, but erroneously reported there were none left. On November 10, Blue was commanded by General Thomas Flournoy to withdraw from Fort Pierce and rejoin his regiment (which was being moved to New Orleans), leaving Fort Pierce abandoned.

One month later, Lieutenant-Colonel George Henry Nixon requested a transfer to Fort Pierce and was granted his request by General Claiborne. Prior to commanding Fort Pierce, Nixon was in command of the Mount Vernon Cantonment. While stationed at Fort Pierce, Nixon commanded soldiers who scoured the area of the Perdido River for Red Sticks. After the Battle of Holy Ground on December 23, a group of mounted militia riflemen were sent to Fort Pierce to join their regiment who was already garrisoned there. By January 1814, Nixon wrote to David Holmes, the governor of Mississippi Territory, requesting a surgeon's mate for Fort Pierce. Nixon also requested power to court-martial mutinous soldiers at the fort. After serving at Fort Pierce, Nixon was transferred to Fort Claiborne.

The soldiers in Fort Pierce continued to have sporadic engagements with Red Stick warriors throughout 1814. In a May 1814 letter, Brigadier General Joseph Graham wrote to Benjamin Hawkins that Red Sticks were still approaching (and being fired upon from), Fort Pierce. In June 1814, settlers from Fort Pierce came upon a house one mile from the fort and killed three Red Stick warriors. After this encounter, settlers in the area feared retaliatory Red Stick attacks.

In October 1814, General Andrew Jackson made Fort Pierce his headquarters prior to the Battle of Pensacola. After the Battle of Pensacola, Jackson again made Fort Pierce his headquarters and ordered troops from Fort Montgomery, East Tennessee militia, Mississippi Territory volunteers, Chickasaw, Choctaw, and friendly Creeks (accompanied by Samuel Moniac, father of David Moniac), to search the area around the Escambia River for any remaining Red Sticks.

In addition to United States Army soldiers, the 1st and 2nd Regiment West Tennessee Militia were stationed at Fort Pierce at various times.

=== Postwar ===
The site of Fort Pierce has not undergone formal archaeological investigation. The fort site is located within a private hunting camp.

== Sources ==
- Halbert, Henry; Ball, Timothy (1895). The Creek War of 1813 and 1814. Chicago, Illinois: Donohue & Henneberry. ISBN 978-1-375-70277-5.
- Harris, W. Stuart (1977). Dead Towns of Alabama. Tuscaloosa, Alabama: University of Alabama Press. ISBN 0-8173-1125-4.
- Jackson, Andrew (1927). Bassett, John Spencer (ed.). Correspondence of Andrew Jackson. Vol. 2. Washington, D.C.: Carnegie Institution of Washington.
- Owsley, Frank Lawrence Jr. (2008). Struggle for the Gulf Borderlands. Gainesville, Florida: Library Press@UF. ISBN 978-1-947372-34-4.
- Parker, Jim (2012a). "Investigations Relative to the 19th Century Tensaw Military Frontier in Southwest Alabama" (PDF). Escambia Echoes. 39 (6).
- Parker, James W. (2012b). "Appendix 2: Known and Potential Archaeological Sites in Alabama". In Braund, Kathryn E. Holland (ed.). Tohopeka: Rethinking the Creek War & the War of 1812. Tuscaloosa, Alabama: University of Alabama Press. ISBN 978-0-8173-5711-5.
- Pickett, Albert James (1878). History of Alabama, and Incidentally of Georgia and Mississippi, from the Earliest Period. Tuscaloosa, Alabama: Willo Publishing Company. ISBN 978-1-363-31084-5.
- Smith, Derek (1990). "'Frontier Armageddon' at Bloody Fort Mims". Army. 40 (1). ISSN 0004-2455.
- Stiggins, George (1989). Brown, Virginia Pounds (ed.). Creek Indian History: A Historical Narrative of the Genealogy, Traditions and Downfall of the Ispocoga Or Creek Indian Tribe of Indians by One of the Tribe, George Stiggins (1788–1845). Tuscaloosa, Alabama: University of Alabama Press. ISBN 0-942301-15-3.
- Stowe, Noel R.; Hoyt, Marvin (1975). Olsen, Susan C. (ed.). Archeological Investigation at Fort Mims (PDF) (Technical report). Washington, D. C.: National Park Service. 4. "Archeological Completion Report Series"
- Waselkov, Gregory A. (2006). A Conquering Spirit: Fort Mims and the Redstick War of 1813–1814. Tuscaloosa, Alabama: University of Alabama. ISBN 0-8173-1491-1.
- Waselkov, Gregory; Christopher, Raven (2012). Archaeological Survey of the Old Federal Road in Alabama (Technical report). Montgomery, Alabama: Alabama Department of Transportation. "Submitted by the Center for Archaeological Studies University of South Alabama."
- Weir, Howard (2016). A Paradise of Blood: The Creek War of 1813–14. Yardley, Pennsylvania: Westholme. ISBN 978-1-59416-270-1.
