= Montgomery Hill Baptist Church =

Historic church in Alabama, United States

- U.S. National Register of Historic Places
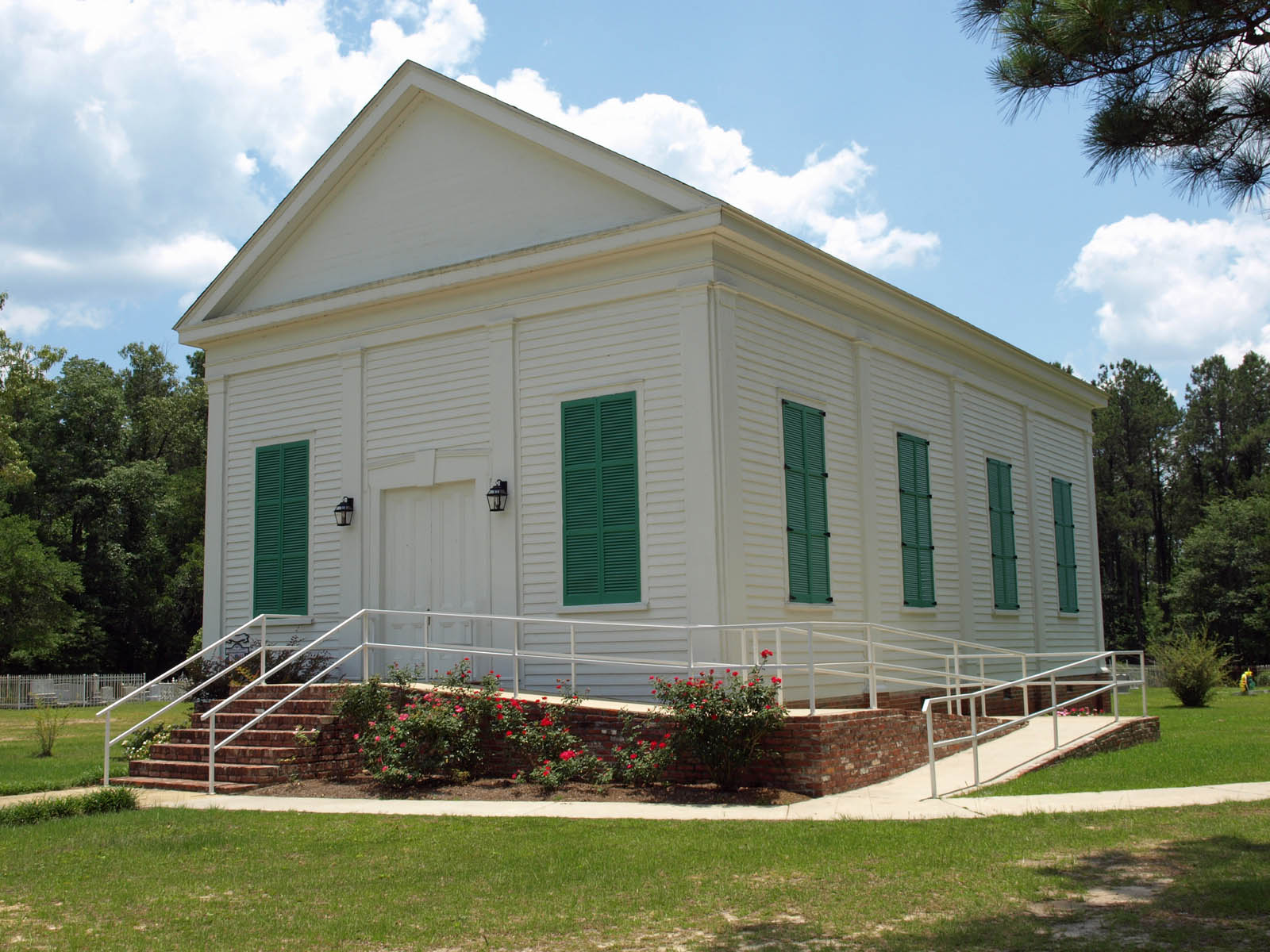
- The church in June 2013

- Location within Alabama Location within the United States
- Location: E side Hwy. 59 on CR 80, Tensaw, Alabama
- Coordinates: 31°9′46″N 87°47′12″W
- Area: 4 acres (1.6 ha)
- Built: 1853
- Built by: John Blake
- Architectural style: Greek Revival
- MPS: Rural Churches of Baldwin County TR
- NRHP reference No.: 88001352
- Added to NRHP: August 25, 1988

Montgomery Hill Baptist Church is a historic church on the east side of Highway 59 on CR 80 in Tensaw, Alabama, United States. It was built in 1853 in a Greek Revival style. The building was added to the National Register of Historic Places in 1988.
