= Lewis Williams (politician) =

American politician (1782–1842)

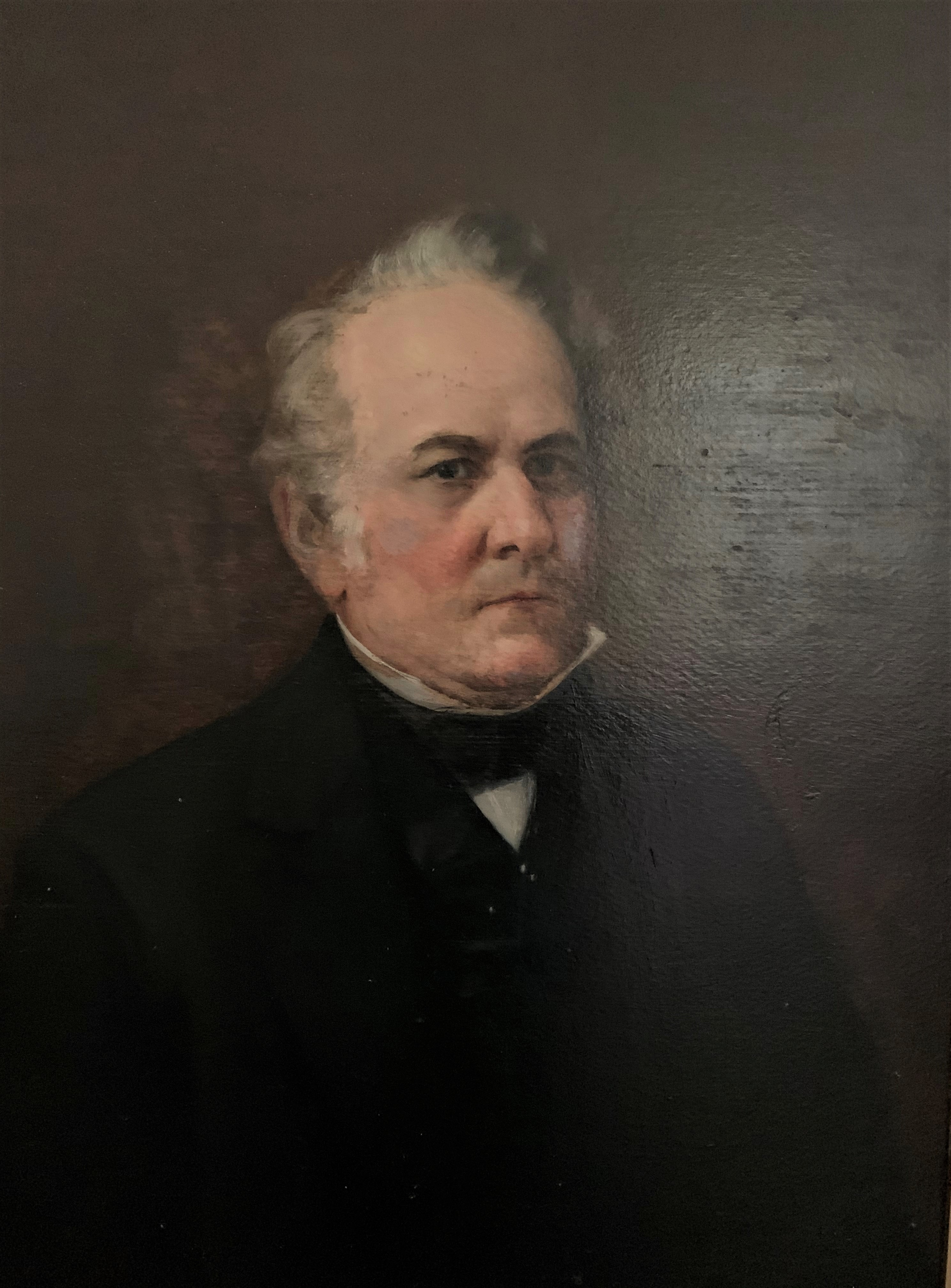

Dean of the United States House of Representatives
- In office March 4, 1833 – February 23, 1842
- Preceded by: William McCoy
- Succeeded by: Dixon Hall Lewis

Member of the U.S. House of Representatives from North Carolina's 13th district
- In office March 4, 1815 – February 23, 1842
- Preceded by: Meshack Franklin
- Succeeded by: Anderson Mitchell

Personal details
- Born: February 1, 1782 Surry County, North Carolina, U.S.
- Died: February 23, 1842 (aged 60) Washington, D.C., U.S.
- Resting place: Lewisville, North Carolina, U.S.
- Party: Whig (1837–1842)
- Other political affiliations: Democratic-Republican (before 1825); National Republican (1825–1837)
- Relatives: Robert Williams (brother); John Williams (brother)
- Education: University of North Carolina at Chapel Hill

Lewis Williams (February 1, 1782 – February 23, 1842) was a U.S. representative from North Carolina between 1815 and 1842.

Born in Surry County, North Carolina (present-day Forsyth County), Williams attended the University of North Carolina at Chapel Hill, graduating in 1808. He was first elected to the North Carolina House of Commons in 1812, serving for a single term (1813-1814) before being elected to the 14th United States Congress as a (Jeffersonian) Republican in 1814.

Williams was re-elected to successive Congresses before his death in 1842. In keeping with the turbulent times in which the parties realigned, he served under five different party labels: as a Republican, as a Crawford Republican, as a supporter of John Quincy Adams, as an "Anti-Jacksonian," and finally as a Whig. During his time in Congress, he chaired the Committee on Claims in the 15th through 21st Congresses, and the Committee on Territories during the 23rd Congress. Williams also introduced the resolution creating the United States House Committee on Agriculture. He died in Washington, DC, while in office in 1842 and is buried in Panther Creek Cemetery near Lewisville, North Carolina.

Williams was a twin, five minutes older, with Thomas Lanier Williams I; also brother to Robert Williams, a U.S. Congressman from North Carolina, and John Williams, a U.S. Senator from Tennessee.

== See also ==
- List of members of the United States Congress who died in office (1790–1899)

U.S. House of Representatives
Preceded by Meshack Franklin	Member of the U.S. House of Representatives from North Carolina's 13th congressional district 1815–1842	Succeeded by Anderson Mitchell
