= 39th Infantry Regiment (War of 1812) =

East Tennesseans in Creek War

- Active: 29 January 1813 – 1815
- Country: United States
- Type: Infantry
- Engagements: War of 1812: Battle of Horseshoe Bend

Commanders
- Notable commanders: Colonel John Williams

The 39th United States Infantry was a regiment of the regular Army. It was authorized on January 29, 1813, and recruited in the East by Colonel John Williams of Tennessee. It was commanded by Colonel Williams, who had previously led the Mounted Volunteers of East Tennessee. On December 31, 1813, Major General Thomas Pinckney ordered the regiment to join Andrew Jackson's force, countermanding orders that had been sent from General Thomas Flournoy at New Orleans, who wanted them there, thus providing a disciplined core and strategic resupply for his command, which was down to about 75 men eating roots and acorns. The historian Henry Adams speculated that, without this regiment, Jackson would have fared no better in 1814 than he had the previous year.

Jackson welcomed the 39th. Since the beginning of his campaign in the Creek War, Jackson was troubled by serious discipline problems with his militia and volunteers, particularly the militia from East Tennessee. So he prosecuted a Private John Woods, only 18, under false charges. Woods had spent his last month in the camp of the 39th. The night before his execution the officers of the 39th signed and sent Jackson a petition asking for mercy. He not only failed to grant it, he made the 39th shoot him. He told his quartermaster that "I am truly happy in having the Colonel with me. His regiment will give strength to my arm and quell mutiny". The 39th was never happy with Jackson after that, and Col. Williams never returned to lead the unit. Williams said in a campaign pamphlet in 1828 that Woods cried "bitterly and loudly"; the Jackson camp claimed he was belligerent and deserved to die.

At the Battle of Horseshoe Bend, Jackson placed the regiment, (because they were the best-trained soldiers he had) in the center of his assault force. Consequently, the 39th suffered significant casualties — 20 killed and 52 wounded, and those figures are disputed. Col. Williams reported to U.S. Secretary of War John Armstrong Jr. that "one half of the officers and one sixth of the troops of the 39th engaged in the battle of Tohopeka are among the killed and wounded. The officers remaining with the regiment fit for duty are insufficient for ordinary camp duty." It is said that the Creek nation lost more casualties that day than any other one day in the history of the entire Indian Wars. They gave up over a million acres of what was described as the "best land for settlement" that was left east of the Mississippi River.

Williams was appointed colonel of this regiment on July 18, 1813. Thomas H. Benton was a lieutenant colonel of this regiment, Lemuel P. Montgomery was a major, and Sam Houston was an ensign.

== Postwar consolidation of regiment ==
In 1815, after that war ended, the 39th was consolidated with the 8th and 24th Regiments to form the 7th Infantry Regiment. The Flag of the 39th was returned to Col. Williams and is now on display at the East Tennessee History Center in Knoxville. It was embroidered by the handiwork of Col. Williams' sister-in-law, Mary (Polly) Lawson McClung Williams.

== Sources ==
- Williams, Samuel C. (January 1925). "A Forgotten Campaign". Tennessee Historical Magazine. VIII (4). Tennessee Historical Society: 266–276. ISSN 2333-9012. JSTOR 42637505. OCLC 2451052.
