= John Williams (Tennessee politician) =

American politician

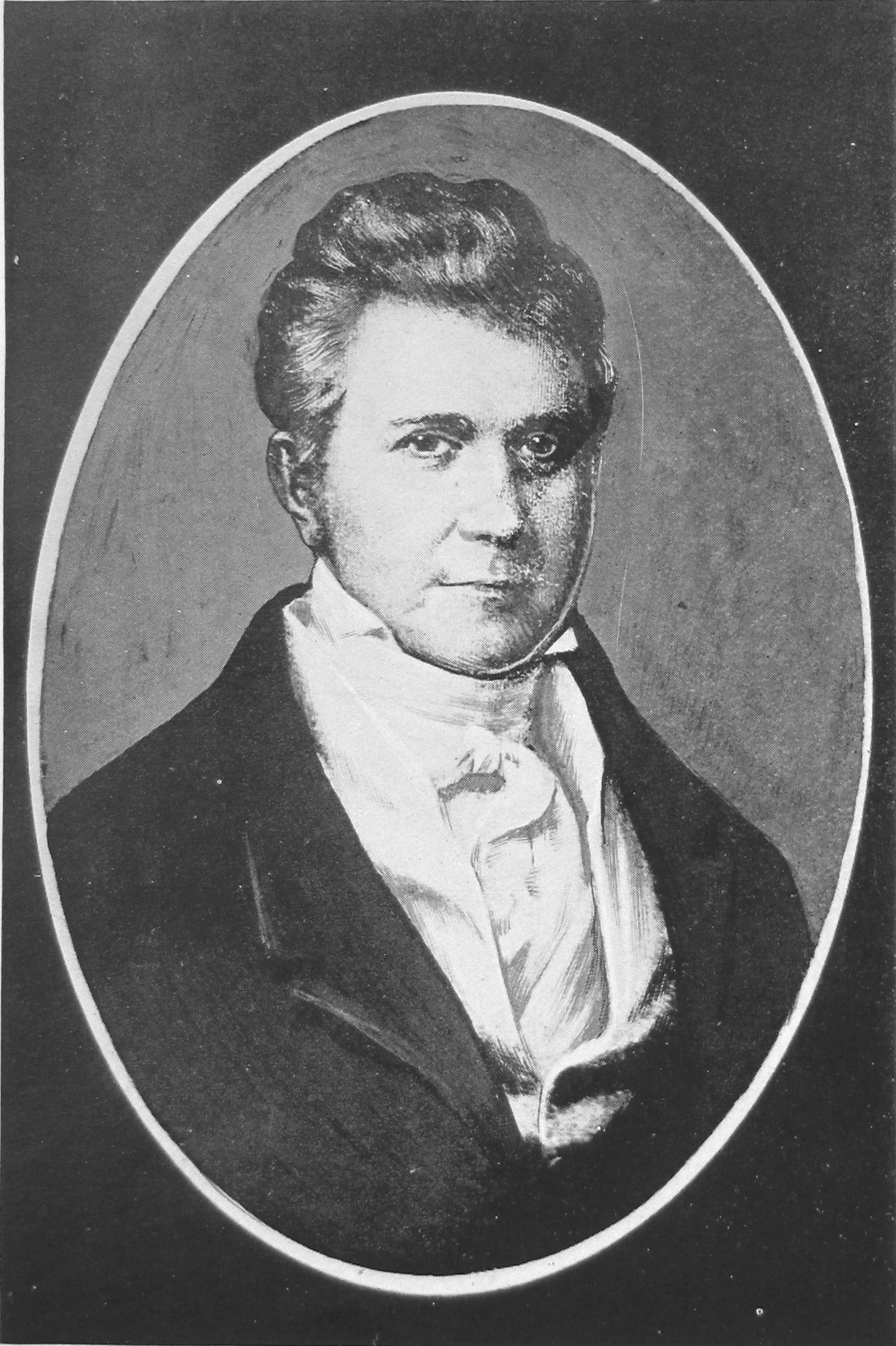

United States Senator from Tennessee
- In office October 10, 1815 – March 3, 1823
- Preceded by: Jesse Wharton
- Succeeded by: Andrew Jackson

Personal details
- Born: January 29, 1778 Surry County, North Carolina, U.S.
- Died: August 10, 1837 (aged 59) Knoxville, Tennessee, U.S.
- Resting place: First Presbyterian Church Cemetery; Knoxville, Tennessee, U.S.
- Party: Democratic-Republican
- Spouse: Melinda White
- Relations: Lewis Williams (brother); Thomas Lanier Williams I (brother); Robert Williams (cousin); James White (father-in-law); Hugh Lawson White (brother-in-law)
- Children: Joseph, John, Mary, Cynthia, Susan
- Profession: Attorney

Military service
- Branch/service: U.S. Army
- Years of service: 1799–1800, 1813–1815
- Rank: Colonel
- Battles/wars: Battle of Horseshoe Bend

John Williams (January 29, 1778 – August 10, 1837) was an American lawyer, soldier, and statesman, operating primarily out of Knoxville, Tennessee, in the first part of the 19th century. He represented Tennessee in the United States Senate from 1815 to 1823, when he lost reelection to Andrew Jackson. Williams also served as colonel of the 39th U.S. Infantry Regiment during the Creek Wars, and played a key role in Jackson's victory at the Battle of Horseshoe Bend in 1814.

Williams later distanced himself from Jackson, and aligned himself with John Quincy Adams and Henry Clay. Adams appointed him chargé d'affaires to the Federal Republic of Central America in 1825.

== Early life ==
Williams was born in what is now Forsyth County, North Carolina (then part of Surry County), the third of twelve children of Joseph and Rebekah Lanier Williams. His father was of Welsh descent, and his mother was descended from French Huguenots. Two of Williams' brothers, Lewis Williams and Robert Williams, served as U.S. congressmen in the 19th century. Another brother, Thomas Lanier Williams, was a prominent Tennessee judge. Williams was also the cousin of Congressman Marmaduke Williams.

Williams studied law in Salisbury, North Carolina, in the late 1790s, and served as a captain in the 6th U.S. Infantry, from 1799 to 1800. Shortly afterward, he relocated to Knoxville, Tennessee, where he was admitted to the bar in 1803. In October 1803 he was one of three lawyers representing Judge David Campbell at his impeachment. Around 1805, he married Melinda White, daughter of Knoxville's founder, James White. By this marriage John Overton and Hugh Lawson White were his brothers-in-law.

In 1807, Williams was appointed Tennessee's attorney general, and served in this capacity until the following year. In 1811, he led a mass meeting of Knox County citizens that condemned Archibald Roane for resigning from the state legislature to run for circuit court judge. In a letter published in a local newspaper, Williams blasted Roane as too selfish and too much of a drunkard to be a faithful judge.

== Military activities (1812–1815) ==
=== Raiding Seminole Villages ===
In December 1812, John Williams assembled 240 Tennessee mounted volunteers with 220 Georgia troops led by Rifleman Colonel Thomas Adams Smith to conduct a raid on the Seminoles who were reported to be allegedly planning attacks on Americans as allies of the British and Spanish. The combined American militia force marched on Payne's Town on February 8, 1813. The Americans engaged the Seminole warriors for several hours before driving them off. The Americans set their base of operations. The Americans conducted raids on nearby villages destroying homes and crops. The Americans killed 20 Seminole warriors, burned 386 houses, destroyed 2,000 bushels of corn, and destroyed 2,000 deerskins. The Americans took 300 horses, 400 head of cattle, and 9 Seminoles/Africans as prisoners. John Williams and Thomas Adams Smith with their combined raiding force then withdrew back to friendly lines on February 24, 1813."

=== Recruiting Troops for the Creek War ===
In June 1813, Williams was commissioned in the U.S. Army as a colonel, and ordered to recruit and organize the 39th U.S. Infantry for the purpose of engaging the hostile Red Stick Creeks. Within a few weeks, Williams had managed to recruit and partially equip 600 troops. In early 1814, Williams and the 39th were placed under the command of Andrew Jackson, who was preparing an expedition against the Red Sticks in Alabama.

=== Battle of Horseshoe Bend ===
On March 27, Jackson attacked the Red Stick camp on the Tallapoosa River, initiating the Battle of Horseshoe Bend. At the height of this battle, Williams and the 39th, which comprised Jackson's main line, charged and captured the log barricade with which the Creeks had fortified the riverbend, forcing the Creeks to flee. In his report on the battle, Jackson commended the actions of Williams and several other officers of the 39th. Soldiers who fought under Williams at this battle included future Missouri senator Thomas Hart Benton and future Tennessee and Texas governor, Sam Houston.

=== Handling Weapons Logistics in Washington, D.C. ===
Following the Battle of Horseshoe Bend, Williams went to Washington, D.C., to raise money for the 39th, and gradually acquired a sizable cache of weapons. Throughout 1814, Williams and Jackson bickered over these weapons, with Jackson demanding that Williams give them to a militia company in Tennessee, and Williams arguing that federal arms could not be distributed to militia companies. Jackson questioned Williams' loyalty, and Williams questioned Jackson's authority.

== United States Senate ==
In 1815, Williams was chosen to fill the Senate seat left vacant by the resignation of Jesse Wharton (who had been appointed to the seat a few months earlier following the resignation of George W. Campbell). In 1817, Williams was reelected to a full six-year term. Williams voted in favor of the Second Bank of the United States in 1816, opposed the Bonus Bill of 1817, and voted for the Missouri Compromise of 1820. He was also chairman of the Committee on Military Affairs, and oversaw a reduction of the armed forces.

In 1819, following Jackson's invasion of Florida (then part of Spain), another dispute erupted between Williams and Jackson. Jackson accused Williams of spreading a rumor that Jackson had launched the invasion to protect personal land investments in the Pensacola area, and argued that Williams was assailing his character in private conversations in Washington. In 1821, Williams was one of just four senators to vote against the Adams–Onís Treaty, in which Spain ceded Florida to the United States.

In 1823, Williams made it clear that he was going to support William H. Crawford (another enemy of Jackson) for the presidency, leading Jackson's allies in Tennessee to seek Williams' removal from the Senate. When they were unable to find a candidate with enough support to defeat Williams, Jackson agreed to become a candidate for Williams' seat. Though Williams had the support of the influential Knoxville Register and rising politician Davy Crockett, he lost to Jackson by a margin of 35 votes to 25 at a contentious meeting of the state legislature on October 1, 1823.

== Later life ==
After losing his U.S. Senate seat, Williams ran for Knox County's state senate seat in 1825, but lost to James Anderson by a vote of 982 to 931. President John Quincy Adams pondered appointing Williams Secretary of War, but was dissuaded by Henry Clay, who thought the appointment should go to someone from New York. Adams eventually appointed Williams chargé d'affaires to the Central American Federation, and Williams thus spent most of 1826 at this post in Guatemala.

In 1827, Williams again ran for Knox County's state senate seat. In spite of staunch opposition from Jackson's allies (including Williams' brother-in-law, Hugh Lawson White, who referred to Williams as a "mean politician who can get no man to lye upon him"), Williams won the election, 1,585 to 1,216. During his term, he introduced a bill calling for the construction of a turnpike connecting Anderson County and Kentucky, a bill providing relief for female debtors, and legislation seeking greater oversight of the Bank of Tennessee. He retired from the state senate in 1829. Williams thought that the plan for Removal of the Cherokees from Georgia was a disgrace and wrote, "If our land should be visited with War, Pestilence & Famine it will be nothing more than a just dispensation of Providence for our national crimes," and suggested "that another treaty be made and that an additional sum be paid to the Cherokees, the money to be invested half in the Georgia railroad and half in the Charleston. Such procedure, he believed, would pacify them, and they would then go west in good humor."

Williams spent his later years practicing law and advocating railroad construction. He rejected several invitations to run for Congress, stating he had no desire to go to Washington and serve at the "bow of the emperor," in reference to then-President Jackson. Williams died on August 10, 1837, and was interred in the First Presbyterian Church Cemetery in Knoxville.

== Family and legacy ==
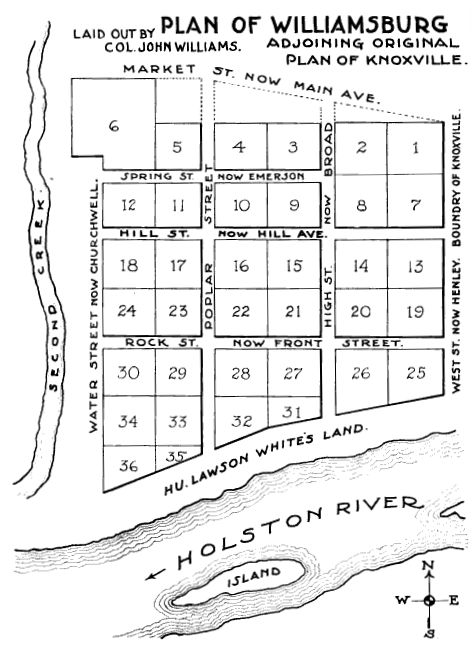
Map of "Williamsburg"

In 1816, Williams made plans to develop a subdivision, "Williamsburg," on what was then the outskirts of Knoxville (now part of the Downtown area). This subdivision was bounded by what is now Henley Street (which at the time was the city's western boundary), Main Street, the riverfront, and Second Creek. The area is now occupied by Maplehurst Park and the Church Street Methodist Church.

In 1826, while Williams was in Guatemala, his wife oversaw the construction of a new family home in East Knoxville, now known as the Colonel John Williams House. The house is still standing, and is listed on the National Register of Historic Places.

Williams' son, Joseph Lanier Williams, served three terms in the U.S. House of Representatives (1837 to 1843). Another son, John Williams II, was a prominent pro-Union leader during the Civil War, and served as vice president of the East Tennessee Convention, which sought to create a separate, Union-aligned state in East Tennessee. John Williams was the great-grandfather of Admiral Richmond P. Hobson, and the great-great-grandfather of noted playwright, Tennessee Williams.

Fort Williams, a supply depot built prior to the Battle of Horseshoe Bend, was named for Williams.

U.S. Senate
Preceded by Jesse Wharton	U.S. senator (Class 2) from Tennessee; 1815–1823; Served alongside: George W. Campbell, John Eaton,	Succeeded by Andrew Jackson
Diplomatic posts
Preceded by None	United States Chargé d'Affaires, Guatemala; May 3, 1826 – December 1, 1826	Succeeded by Charles G. DeWitt
