= Fort Mims massacre =

Part of the Creek War in Alabama, United States (1813)

Coordinates: 31.181°N 87.838°W

- Part of Creek War
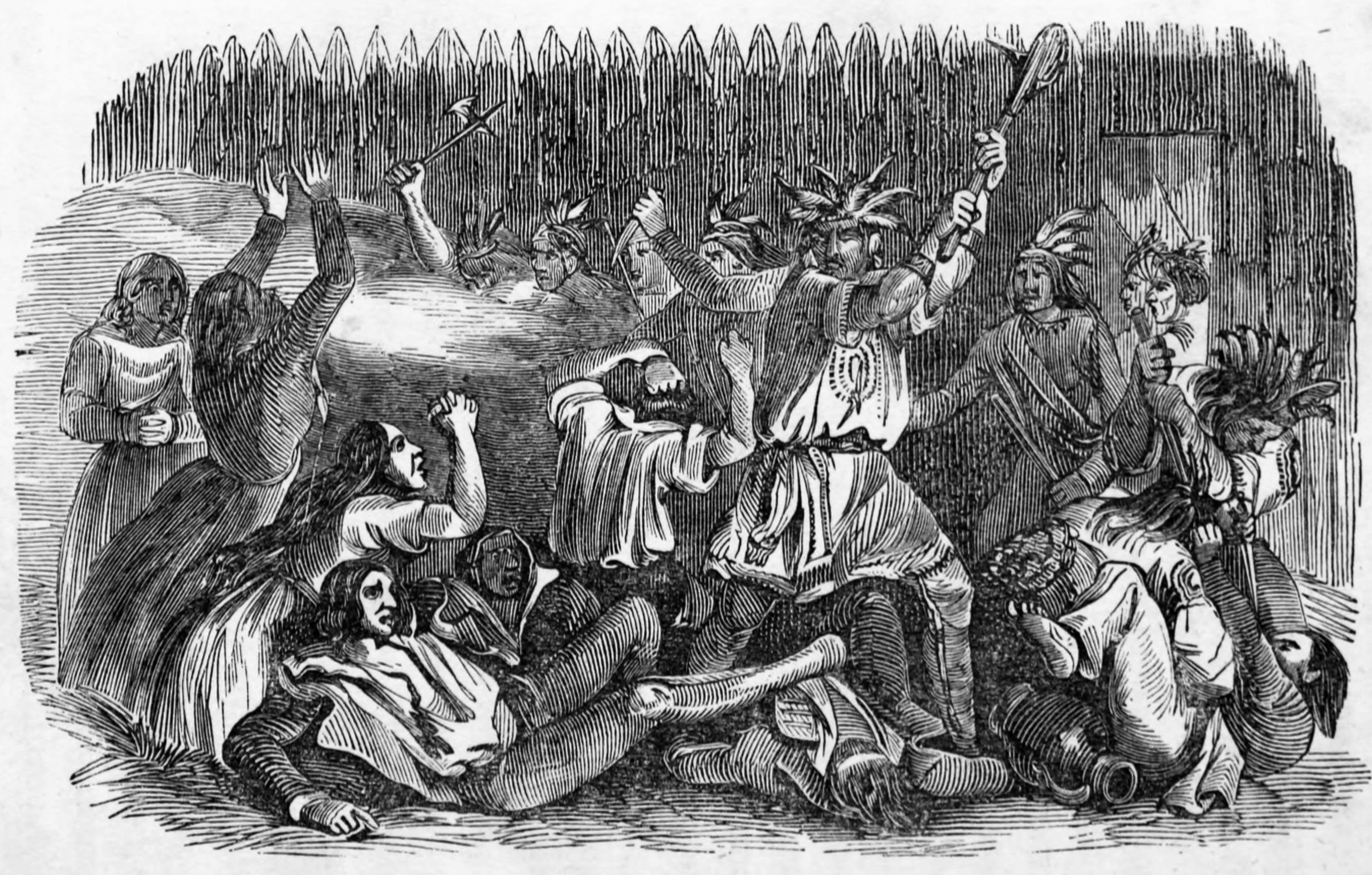
Date	August 30, 1813
Location	35 to 40 miles north of Mobile, Alabama near Bay Minette, Alabama
Result	Red Stick victory

Belligerents
Red Sticks	United States

Commanders and leaders
William Weatherford; Peter McQueen	Major Daniel Beasley †; Dixon Bailey †

Strength
750–1,000warriors	265 militia, including: 70 Tensaw home militia; 175 Mississippi volunteers; 16 from Fort Stoddard

Casualties and losses
50 to 100 killed unknown wounded	265 militia killed or captured 252 civilians killed or captured unknown wounded Fort Mims severely damaged

The Fort Mims massacre occurred on August 30, 1813, at a fortified homestead site 35–40 miles north of Mobile, Alabama, during the Creek War. A large force of Creek Indians belonging to the Red Sticks faction, under the command of Peter McQueen and William Weatherford, stormed the fort and defeated the militia garrison.

The Red Sticks performed the massacre, killing almost all the remaining mixed Creek, white settlers, and militia at Fort Mims. Afterward, they took nearly 100 enslaved African Americans as captives. The small fort consisted of a blockhouse and stockade surrounding the house and outbuildings of settler Samuel Mims.

== Background ==
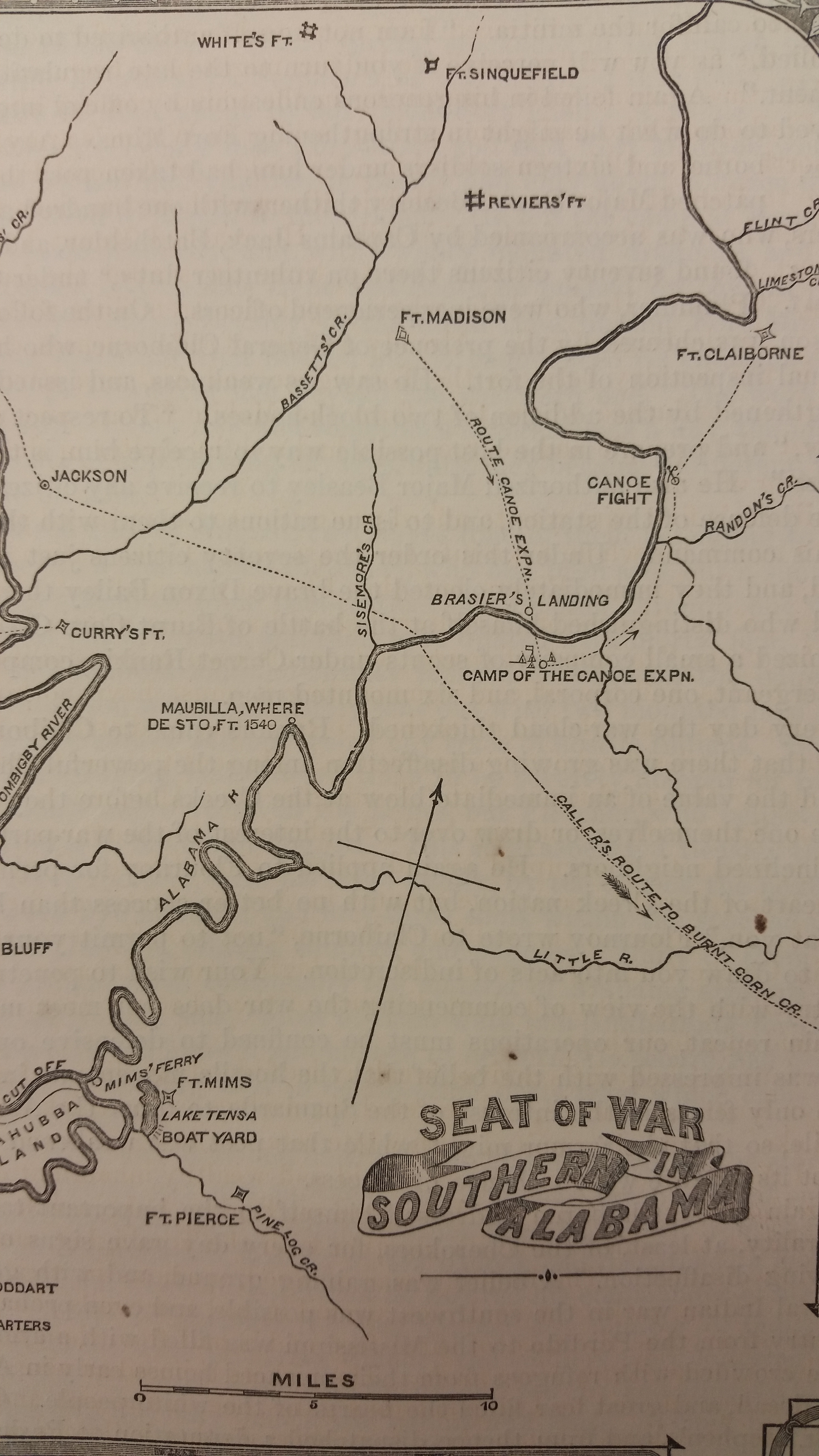
Map of Alabama during the War of 1812. Fort Mims is located in the lower left.

At the time of the War of 1812, tensions within the Creek Nation caused it to divide into factions. Creek nativists known as the Red Sticks wanted to maintain tradition and argued against more accommodation of white settlers. But other Creeks, who tended to have had more trading and other relations with whites, favored adopting elements of European-American culture. The Red Stick faction from the Upper Towns opposed both land cessions to settlers and the Lower Towns' assimilation into European-American culture.

These natives were soon called "Red Sticks" because they had used the "red stick of war," a favored weapon and symbolic Creek war declaration. Civil war among the Creeks erupted during the summer of 1813. The Red Sticks attacked headmen associated with accommodation. In the Upper Towns, they began a systematic slaughter of domestic livestock, most of which belonged to men who had gained power by adopting aspects of European culture. Not understanding internal issues among the Creek, frontier whites were alarmed about increasing tensions and began sheltering in various posts and blockhouses such as Fort Mims, while the states sent military reinforcements to the frontier.

American spies learned that Peter McQueen's party of Red Sticks were in Pensacola, Spanish Florida, to acquire food assistance, supplies, and arms from the Spanish. The newly arrived Spanish governor, Mateo González Manrique, authorized giving the Creek 45 barrels of corn and flour, blankets, ribbons, scissors, razors, a few steers, and 1000 pounds of gunpowder and an equivalent supply of lead musket balls and bird shot.

When reports of the Creek pack train reached Colonel Caller, he and Major Daniel Beasley of the Mississippi Volunteers led a mounted force of 6 companies, 150 white militia riflemen, and 30 Tensaw under Captain Dixon Bailey to intercept them. James Caller (Call/Cole) ambushed the Red Sticks in the Battle of Burnt Corn in July 1813 as the Creek were having their mid-day meal. While the United States forces were looting the pack trains, the warriors returned and drove off the Americans.

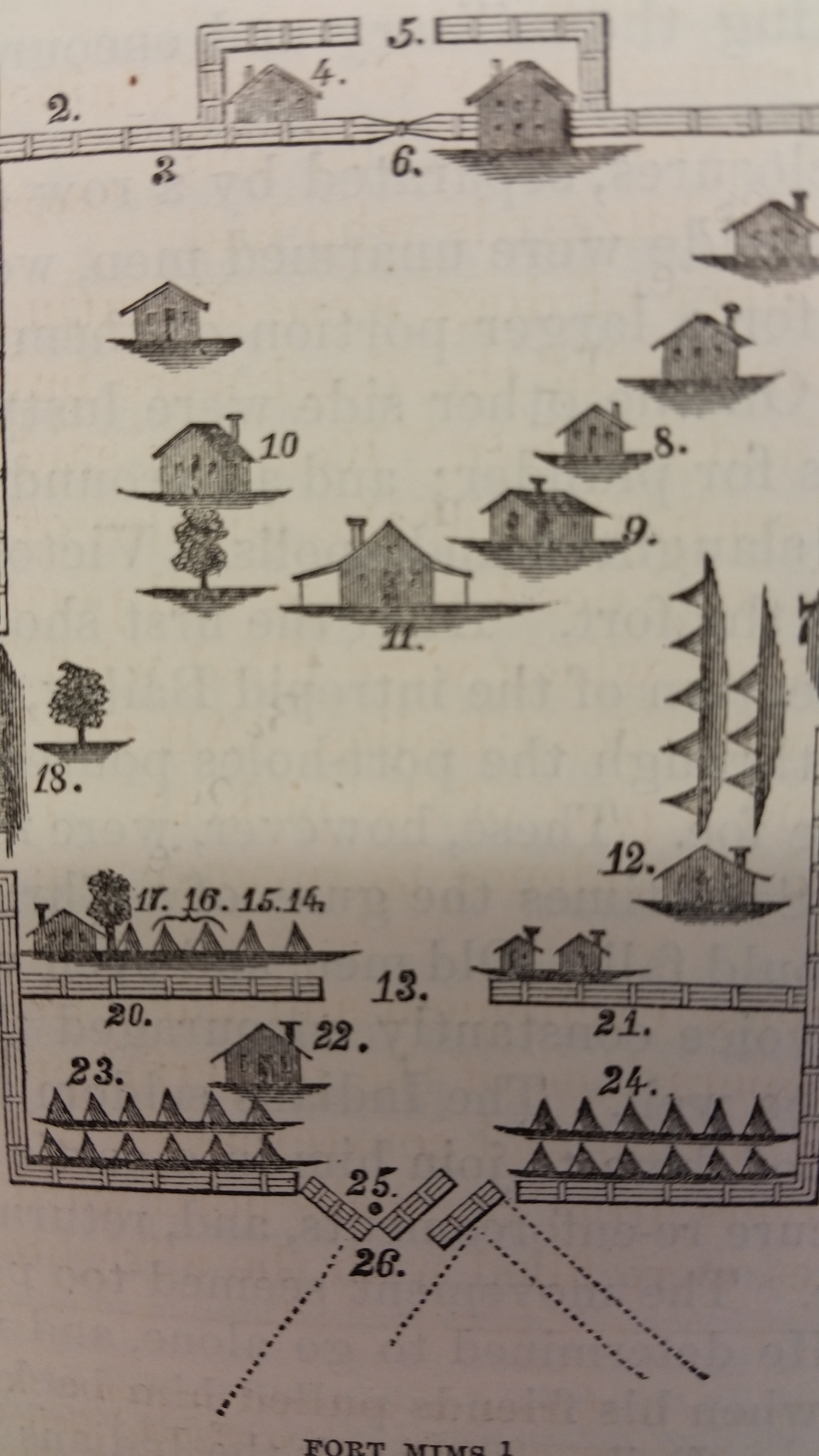
Fort Mims, 22-Beasley's cabin, 25-Beasley's death, 26-eastern gate

In August 1813, Peter McQueen and Red Eagle (Weatherford) were the Red Stick chiefs who commanded the attack on Fort Mims. Nearly 1,000 warriors from thirteen Creek towns of the Alabama, the Tallapoosa, and lower Abeka bands gathered at the outlet of Flat Creek on the lower Alabama River.

The mixed-blood people who were also called Creeks, of Tensaw, who had relocated from Upper Creek Towns with the approval of the Creek National Council, joined European-American settlers in taking refuge within the stockade of Fort Mims. There were about 517 people, including some 265 armed militiamen in the fort. Fort Mims was located about 35 to 45 miles (50–70 km) directly north of Mobile on the eastern side of the Alabama River.

On August 21, 1813, a Choctaw warrior arrived at Fort Easley with news that more than 400 Red Stick warriors planned to attack Fort Easley, then Fort Madison. This news was relayed to General Ferdinand Claiborne at St. Stephens, who sent reinforcements to Fort Easley. Claiborne reportedly believed that Major Daniel Beasley, the commander of Fort Mims, could handle an attack, and that Fort Easley was in more immediate danger.

== Attack ==
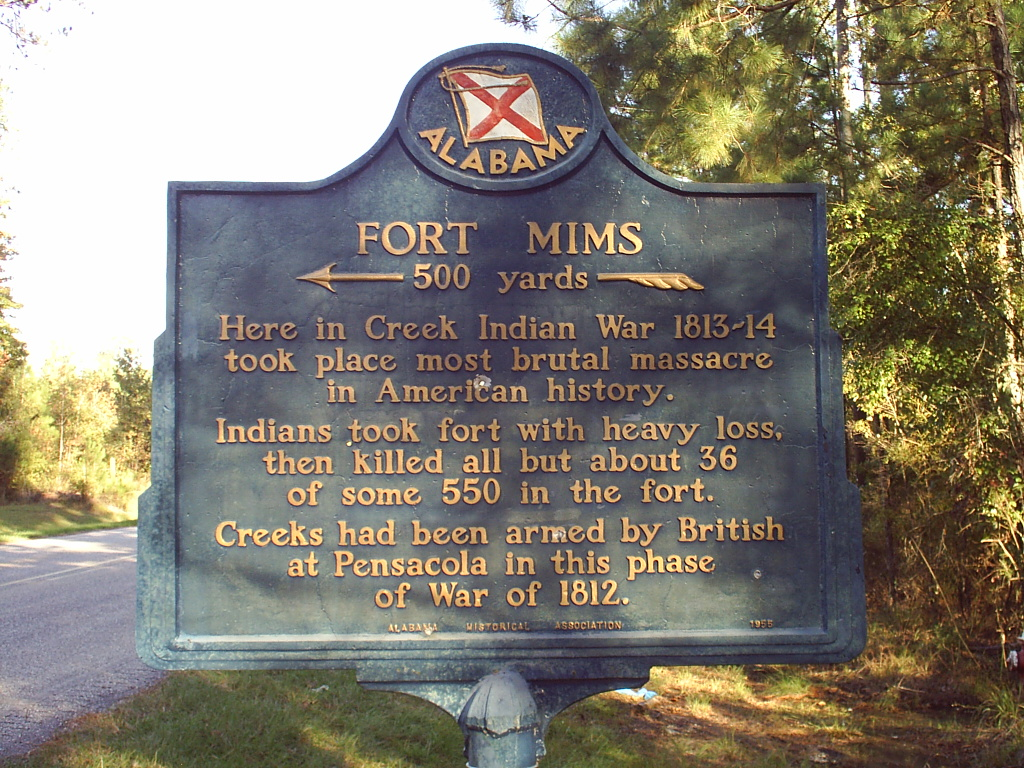
Alabama Historical Association Fort Mims marker.

On August 29, 1813, two enslaved African Americans tending cattle outside the Fort Mims stockade reported that "painted warriors" were in the vicinity, but mounted scouts from the fort found no signs of the war party. Major Beasley had the second slave flogged for "raising a false alarm".

A mounted scout delivered a second warning to Beasley on the morning of the assault, but he dismissed it and took no precautions, reportedly because of being drunk. Some of the sightings reported were by occupants of nearby Fort Pierce. The military officers of Fort Mims thought those may have been false alarms to gain additional military support at Fort Pierce.

Beasley had claimed that he could "maintain the post against any number of Indians", but historians believe the stockade was defended poorly. At the time of the attack, the east gate was partially blocked open by drifting sand. Beasley had posted no pickets or sentries, dismissing the reports the Creeks were near.

The Red Sticks attacked during the mid-day meal, attempting to take the fort in a coup de main by charging the open gate en masse. At the same time, they took control of the gun loopholes and the outer enclosure. Commanded by Captain Bailey, the militia and settlers held the inner enclosure, fighting on for a time; after about two hours there was a pause of about an hour. The Creek, with their initial impetus blunted inside the fort and casualties increasing, held an impromptu council to debate whether to continue the fight. By 3 o'clock, they decided that the Tensaw Native Americans commanded by Dixon Bailey would have to be killed to avenge their treachery at Burnt Corn.

The Creek started a second attack at 3 pm. The remaining defenders fell back into a building called the 'bastion'. The Red Sticks set fire to the 'bastion', which spread out to the rest of the stockade. The warriors forced their way into the inner enclosure and killed most of the militia defenders, the mixed-blood Creek, and white settlers.

After a struggle of hours, the defense collapsed entirely. An estimated 500 militiamen, settlers, slaves and Creeks loyal to the Americans died or were captured. The Red Sticks took some 250 scalps. By 5 pm, the battle was over, and the stockade and buildings sacked and in flames. While the Creek spared the lives of most of the enslaved blacks, they took more than 100 of them captive. At least three women and ten children are known to have been taken captive.

Some 36 people, nearly all men, escaped, including Bailey, who was wounded mortally. Two women and one girl also escaped. When a relief column arrived from Fort Stoddard a few weeks later, it found 247 corpses of the defenders and 100 of the Creek attackers.

After their victory, the Red Sticks "razed the surrounding plantations.... They slaughtered over 5,000 head of cattle, destroyed crops and houses, and murdered or stole slaves."

== Aftermath ==
- Fort Mims Site
- U.S. National Register of Historic Places
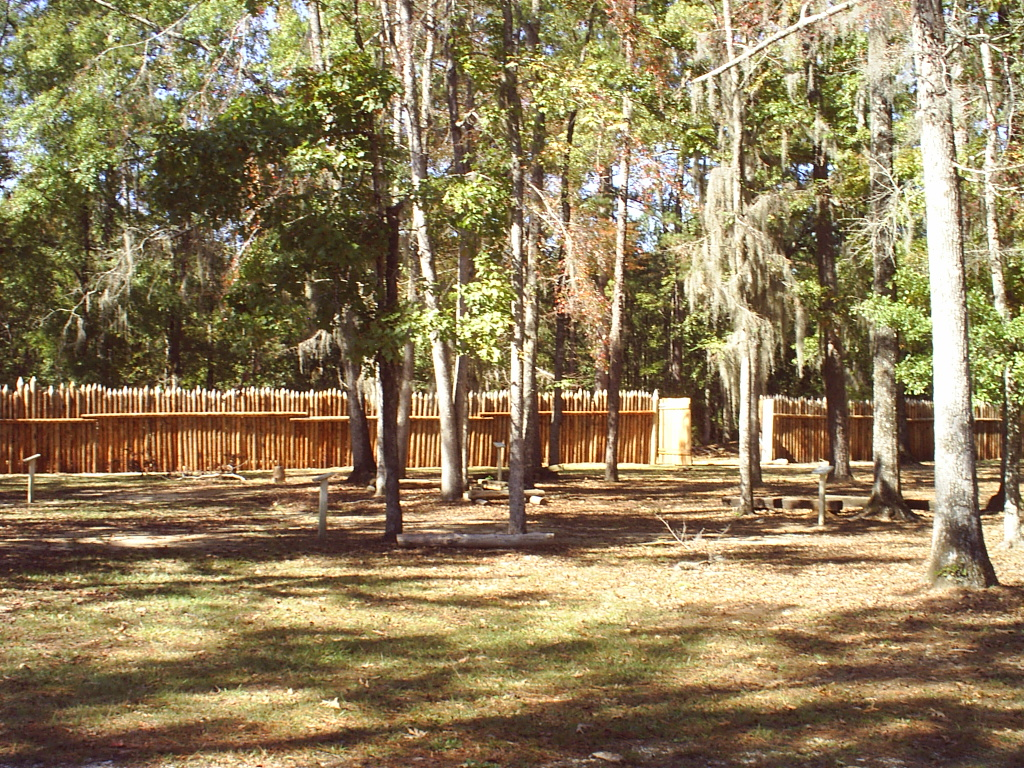
- Inside the reconstructed fort, looking at the west wall and gate.

- Location within Alabama Location within the United States
- Nearest city: Tensaw, Alabama
- Area: 50,000 acres (20,000 ha)
- Built: 1813
- NRHP reference No.: 72000153
- Added to NRHP: September 14, 1972

The Red Sticks' victory at Fort Mims spread panic throughout the Southeastern United States frontier. Settlers both demanded government action and fled the area. In the weeks after the battle, several thousand persons, about half the population of the Tensaw and Tombigbee districts, fled their settlements for Mobile. Its small population of 500 struggled to deal with them. The Red Stick victory was one of the greatest achieved by Native Americans. But the massacre also marked the transition from a civil war within the Creek (Muskogee) nation to a war between the United States and the Red Stick warriors of the Upper Creek.

Because Federal troops were largely occupied with the northern front of the War of 1812, Tennessee, Georgia, and the Mississippi Territory mobilized their militias to move against the Upper Creek towns that had supported the Red Sticks' cause. After several battles, Major General Andrew Jackson commanded these state militias. Together with Cherokee allies, he defeated the Red Sticks Creek faction at the Battle of Horseshoe Bend, ending the Creek War.

Presently, the Fort Mims site is maintained by the Alabama Historical Commission. It was added to the National Register of Historic Places on September 14, 1972.

The Fort Mims massacre is cited in Margaret Mitchell's epic novel Gone with the Wind (1936). In the book, a minor character, Grandma Fontaine, shares her memories of seeing her entire family murdered in the Creek uprising after the massacre as a lesson to the protagonist, Scarlett. She says that a woman should never experience the worst that can happen to her, for then she can never experience fear again.

== See also ==
- List of Indian massacres
- List of massacres in Alabama
- Mississippi Rifles (155th Infantry MNG)
- Tombigbee District
- Attacks on the United States
