= Battle of Horseshoe Bend =

Penultimate battle of the Creek War (1814)

Coordinates: 32°58′56″N 85°44′07″W

- Part of Creek War
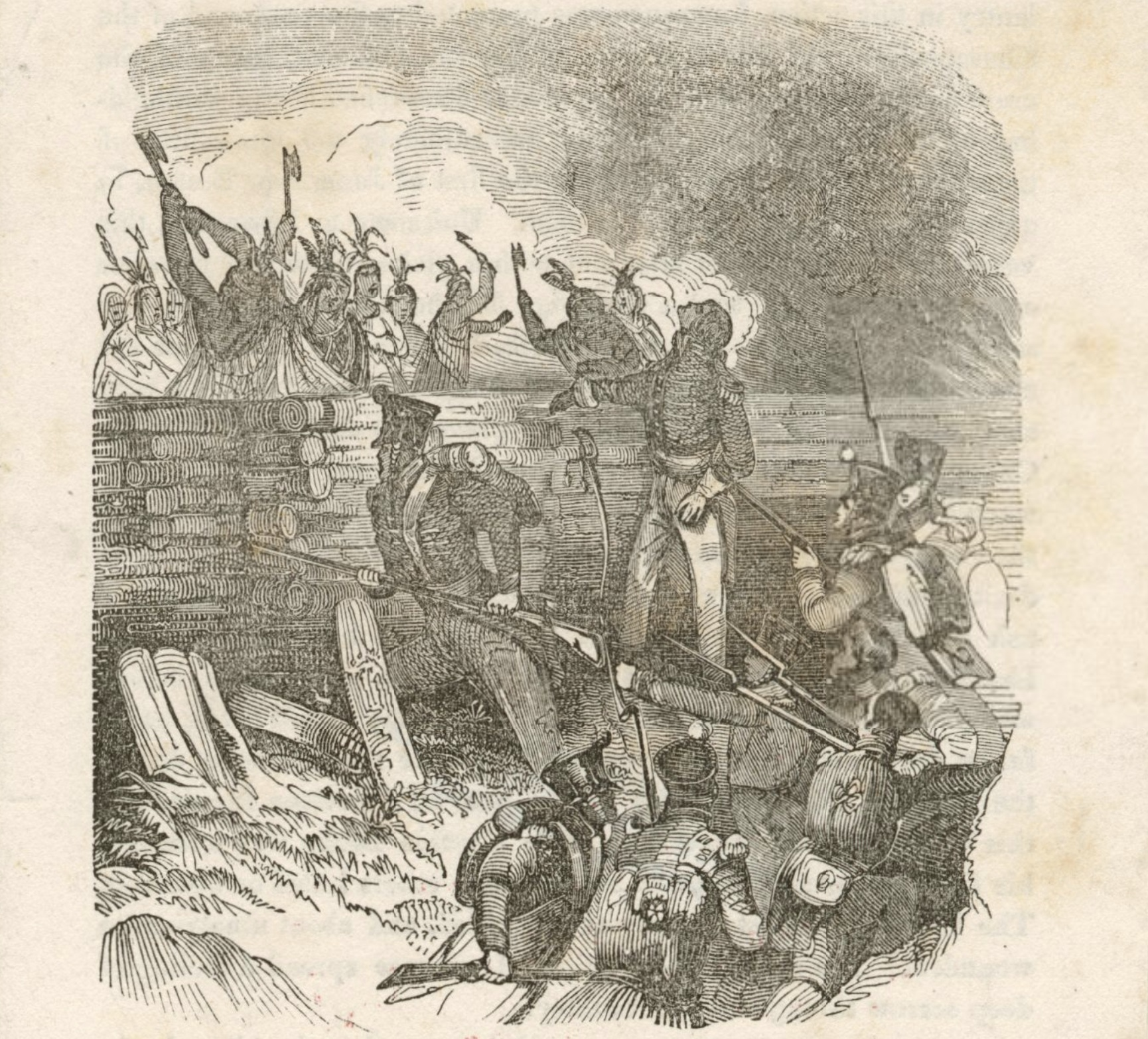
- 1856 illustration of the battle
Date	March 27, 1814
Location	Near Dadeville, Alabama
Result	American victory

Belligerents
Red Sticks	United States; Muscogee; Cherokee; Choctaw

Commanders and leaders
Menawa; Peter McQueen	Andrew Jackson (United States) James Neill (United States) Pushmataha

Strength
~1,000 warriors	American: ~2,000 infantry, ~700 cavalry, unknown artillery Native American: ~600 warriors

Casualties and losses
>800 killed 20 wounded escapees	American: 32 killed 99 wounded Native American: 23 killed 47 wounded

The Battle of Horseshoe Bend was fought in the Mississippi Territory, now central Alabama. On March 27, 1814, United States forces and Native American allies under Major General Andrew Jackson defeated the Red Sticks, a part of the Creek Indian tribe who opposed American expansion, effectively ending the Creek War.

== Background ==
The Creek Indians of Georgia and the eastern part of the Mississippi Territory had become divided into two factions: the Upper Creek (or Red Sticks), a majority who opposed American expansion and sided with the colonial authorities of Spanish Florida; and the Lower Creek, who were more assimilated into the Anglo culture, had a stronger relationship with the U.S. Indian Agent Benjamin Hawkins, and sought to remain on good terms with the Americans.

The Shawnee war leader Tecumseh visited Creek and other Southeast Indian towns in 1811–1812 to recruit warriors to join his war against American territorial encroachment. The Red Sticks, young men who wanted to revive traditional religious and cultural practices, were already forming, resisting assimilation. They began to raid American frontier settlements. When the Lower Creek helped U.S. forces to capture and punish leading raiders, the Lower Creek were punished in turn by the Red Sticks.

In 1813, militia troops intercepted a Red Stick party returning from obtaining arms in (Spanish colonial) Pensacola. While they were looting the material, the Red Sticks returned and defeated them, at what became known as the Battle of Burnt Corn. Red Sticks' raiding of enemy settlements continued; and in August 1813 they attacked an American outpost at Fort Mims.

After the Fort Mims massacre, frontier settlers appealed to the government for help. Since Federal military forces were committed to waging the War of 1812 against Great Britain, the governments of Tennessee, Georgia, and the Mississippi Territory organized militia forces, which together with Lower Creek and Cherokee allies, fought against the Red Sticks.

After leaving Fort Williams in the spring of 1814, Jackson's army cut its way through the forest to within six miles (10 km) of Chief Menawa's Red Stick camp Tehopeka, near a bend in the Tallapoosa River called "Horseshoe Bend"—located in what is now central Alabama, 12 miles (19 km) east of present-day Alexander City. Jackson sent General John Coffee with the mounted infantry and the Indian allies south across the river to surround the Red Sticks' camp, while Jackson stayed with the rest of the 2,000 infantry north of the camp. Added to the militia units were the 39th United States Infantry and about 600 Cherokee, Choctaw, and Lower Creek, fighting against the Red Stick Creek warriors.

=== American Forces ===
West Tennessee Militia: Major General Andrew Jackson

Brigade	Regiments and Other
Headquarters	Mounted Spies: Captain Jean Bean; 39th U.S. Infantry: Colonel John Williams, Major L. P. Montgomery; Artillery: David Deadrick
Doherty's Brigade — Brigadier General George Doherty	1st East Tennessee Militia: Colonel Ewen Allison; 2nd East Tennessee Militia: Colonel Samuel Bunch
Johnson's Brigade — Brigadier General Thomas Johnson	1st West Tennessee Militia: Colonel Richard C. Napier; 3rd Tennessee Militia: Colonel Stephen Copeland
Coffee's Brigade — Brigadier General John Coffee	East Tennessee Mounted Gunmen: Colonel John Brown, Lt. Thomas McElderry; Tennessee Mounted Gunmen: Colonel Robert Dyer; Cherokee Regiment: Colonel Gideon Morgan

== Battle ==
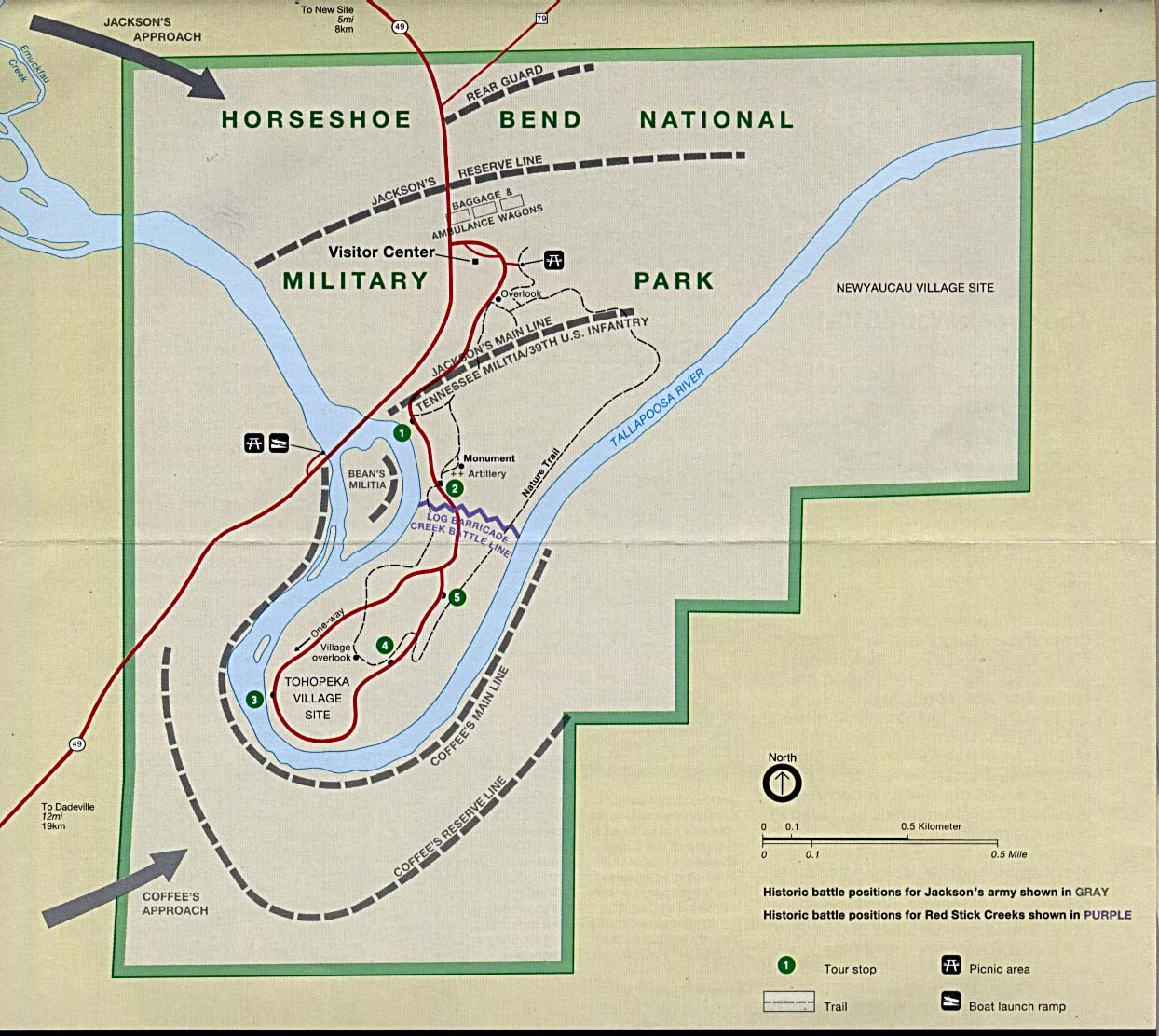
Battle positions

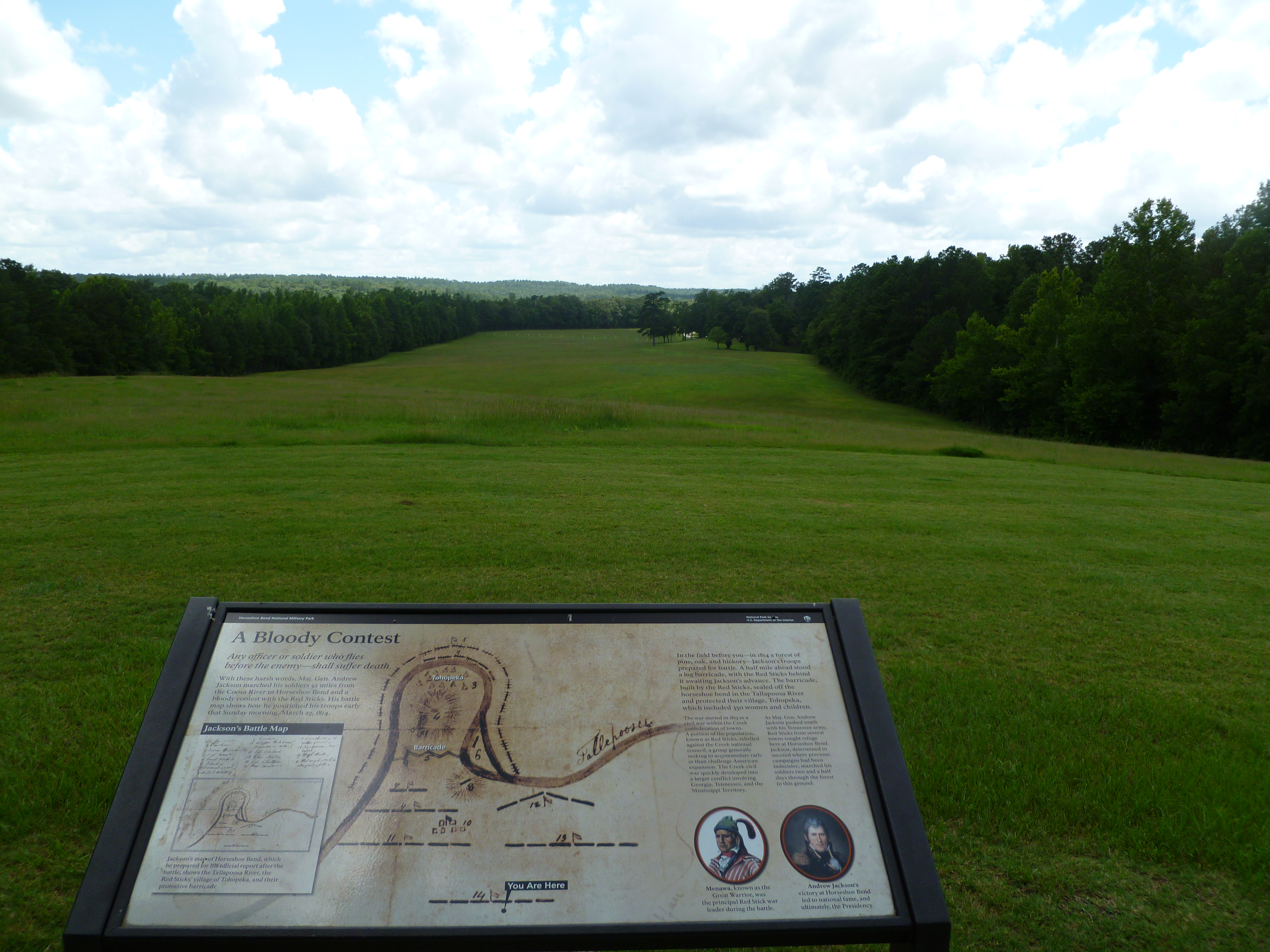
Horseshoe Bend Battlefield

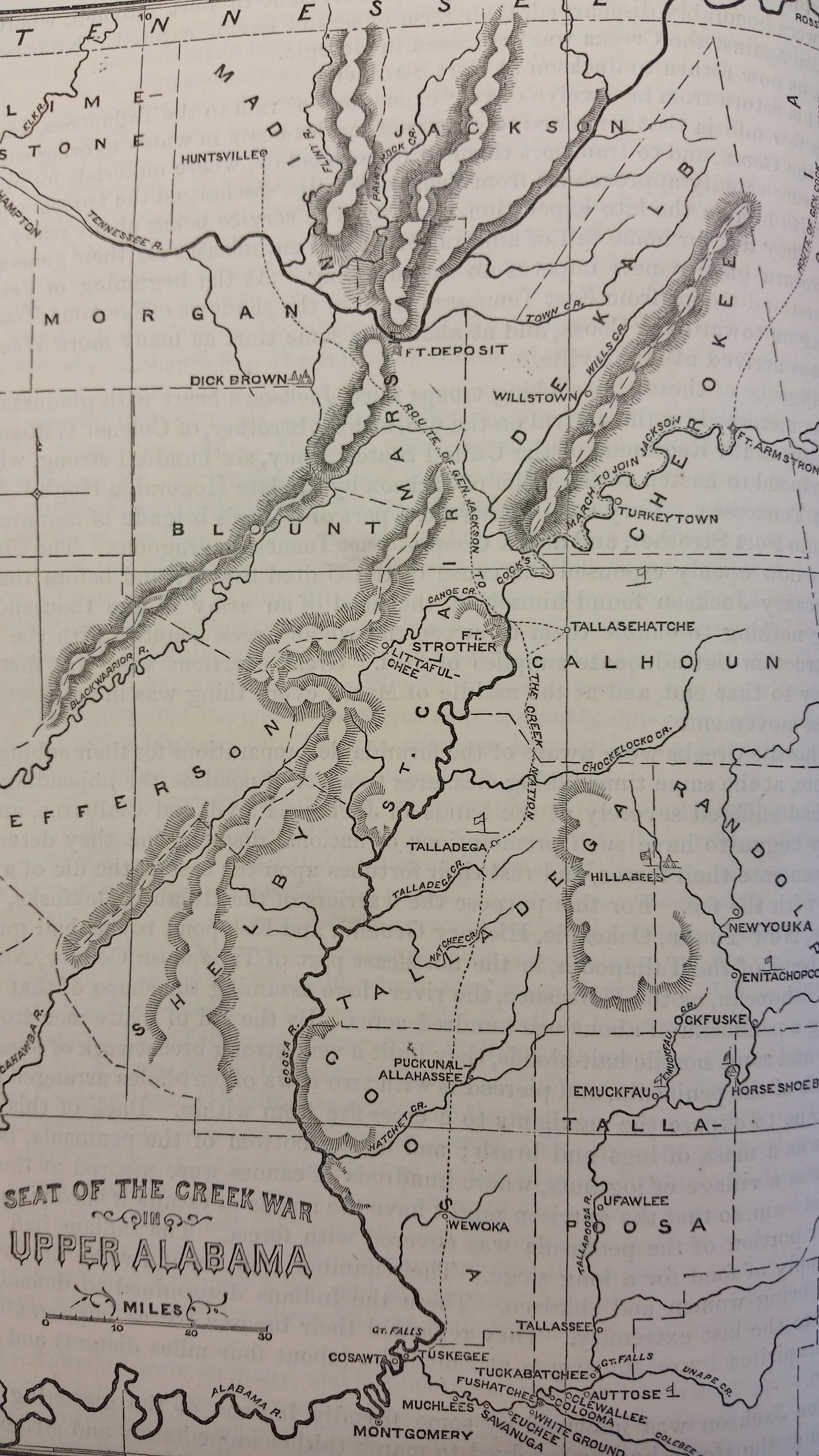
Map of Alabama during the War of 1812

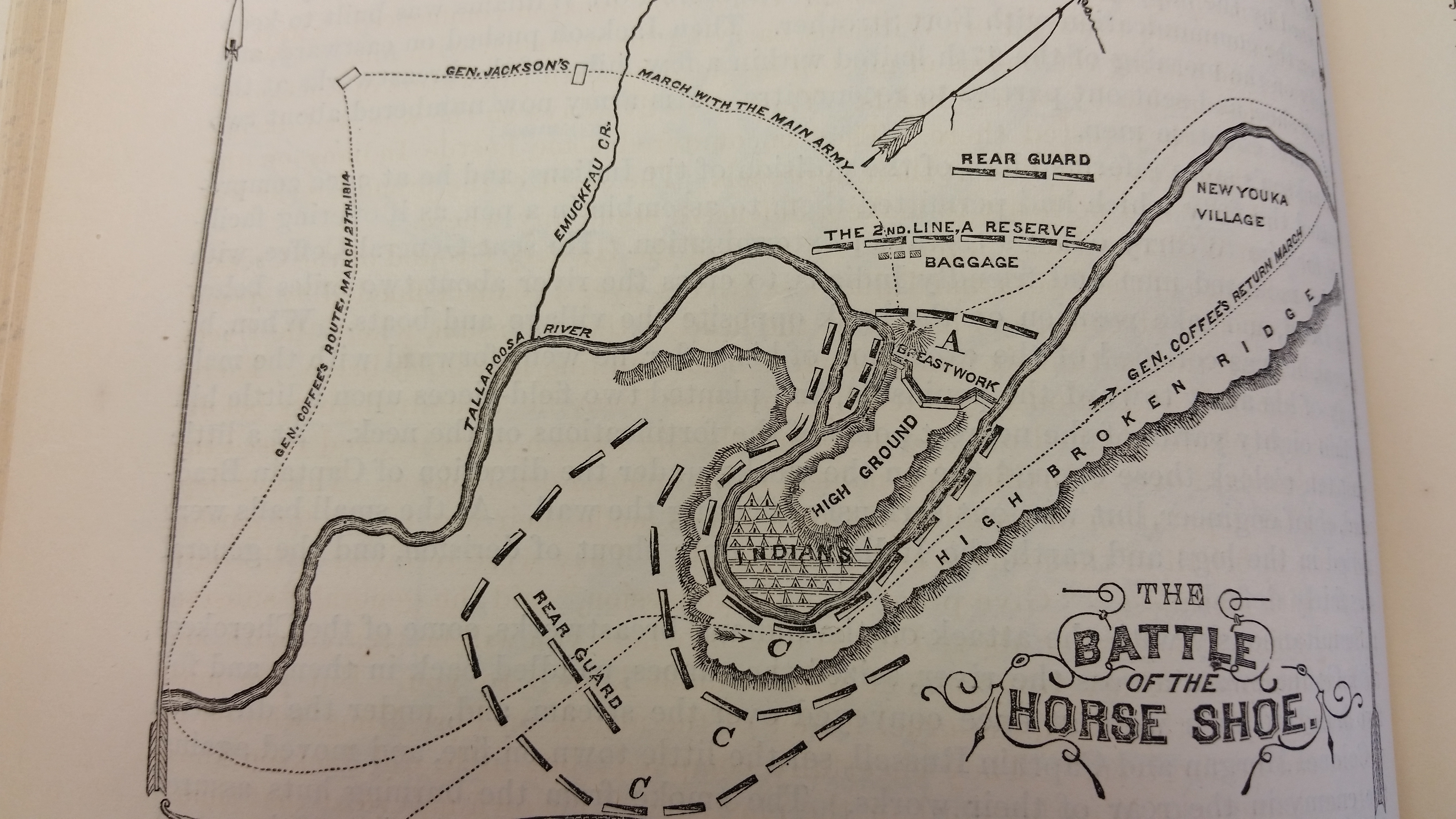
Battle of Horseshoe Bend

On March 27, 1814, General Andrew Jackson led troops consisting of 2,700 American soldiers, 500 Cherokee, and 100 Lower Creek allies up a steep hill near Tehopeka. From this vantage point, Jackson would begin his attack on the Red Stick fortification. At 6:30am, he split his troops and sent roughly 1,300 men to cross the Tallapoosa River and surround the Creek village. Then, at 10:30 a.m., Jackson's remaining troops began an artillery barrage which consisted of two cannons firing for about two hours. Little damage was caused to the Red Sticks or their 400-yard-long, log-and-dirt fortifications. In fact, Jackson was quite impressed with the measures the Red Sticks took to protect their position. As he later wrote:

It is impossible to conceive a situation more eligible for defence than the one they had chosen and the skill which they manifested in their breastwork was really astonishing. It extended across the point in such a direction that a force approaching would be exposed to a double fire, while they lay entirely safe behind it. It would have been impossible to have raked it with cannon to any advantage even if we had had possession of one extremity.

Soon, Jackson ordered a bayonet charge. The 39th U.S. Infantry, led by Colonel John Williams, charged the breastworks and engaged the Red Sticks in hand-to-hand combat. Sam Houston (the future statesman and leader of Texas) served as a third lieutenant in the 39th U.S. Infantry. Houston was one of the first to make it over the log barricade alive and received a wound from a Creek arrow that troubled him for the rest of his life.

Meanwhile, the troops under the command of General John Coffee had successfully crossed the river and surrounded the encampment. They joined the fight and gave Jackson a great advantage. The Creek warriors refused to surrender, though, and the battle lasted for more than five hours. American soldiers killed Creek women and children found inside the encampment, and Coffee's troops shot down 200 Red Stick warriors who were attempting the cross the Tallapoosa River to safety.

At the end, roughly 800 of the 1,000 Red Stick warriors present at the battle were killed. In contrast, Jackson lost fewer than 50 men during the fight and reported 154 wounded. After the battle, Jackson's troops made bridle reins from skin taken from Indian corpses, conducted a body count by cutting off the tips of their noses, and sent their clothing as souvenirs to the "ladies of Tennessee." Chief Menawa was severely wounded but survived; he led about 20 of the original 1,000 warriors across the river and toward safety, to join the Seminole tribe in Spanish Florida.

== Aftermath ==
On August 9, 1814, Andrew Jackson forced the Creek to sign the Treaty of Fort Jackson. The Creek Nation was forced to cede 23 million acres (93,000 km^{2})—half of central Alabama and part of southern Georgia—to the United States government; this included territory of the Lower Creek, who had been allies of the United States. Jackson had determined the areas from his sense of security needs. Of the 23 million acres (93,000 km^{2}) Jackson forced the Creek to cede 1.9 million acres (7,700 km^{2}), which was claimed by the Cherokee Nation, which had also allied with the United States. Jackson was promoted to major general in the U.S. Army after getting agreement to the treaty.

== Legacy ==
The battlefield is preserved in the Horseshoe Bend National Military Park.

Two currently active battalions of the Regular Army (2nd and 3rd Battalions of the 7th Infantry Regiment) perpetuate the lineage of the old 39th Infantry Regiment, which fought at the Battle of Horseshoe Bend.

== In fiction ==
Eric Flint has written a series of alternate history novels, Trail of Glory, that begin with the Battle of Horseshoe Bend. In Flint's version, Houston is only lightly wounded in the battle, allowing him freedom to develop his career, in turn facilitating the author's objectives.

The main character of Paulette Jiles' novel News of the World, 'Captain' Jefferson Kyle Kidd, has a backstory that includes fighting as a youth of 16 in this battle under Jackson.
