= War of 1812 =

1812–1815 conflict in North America

- Part of the Napoleonic Wars and the Sixty Years' War
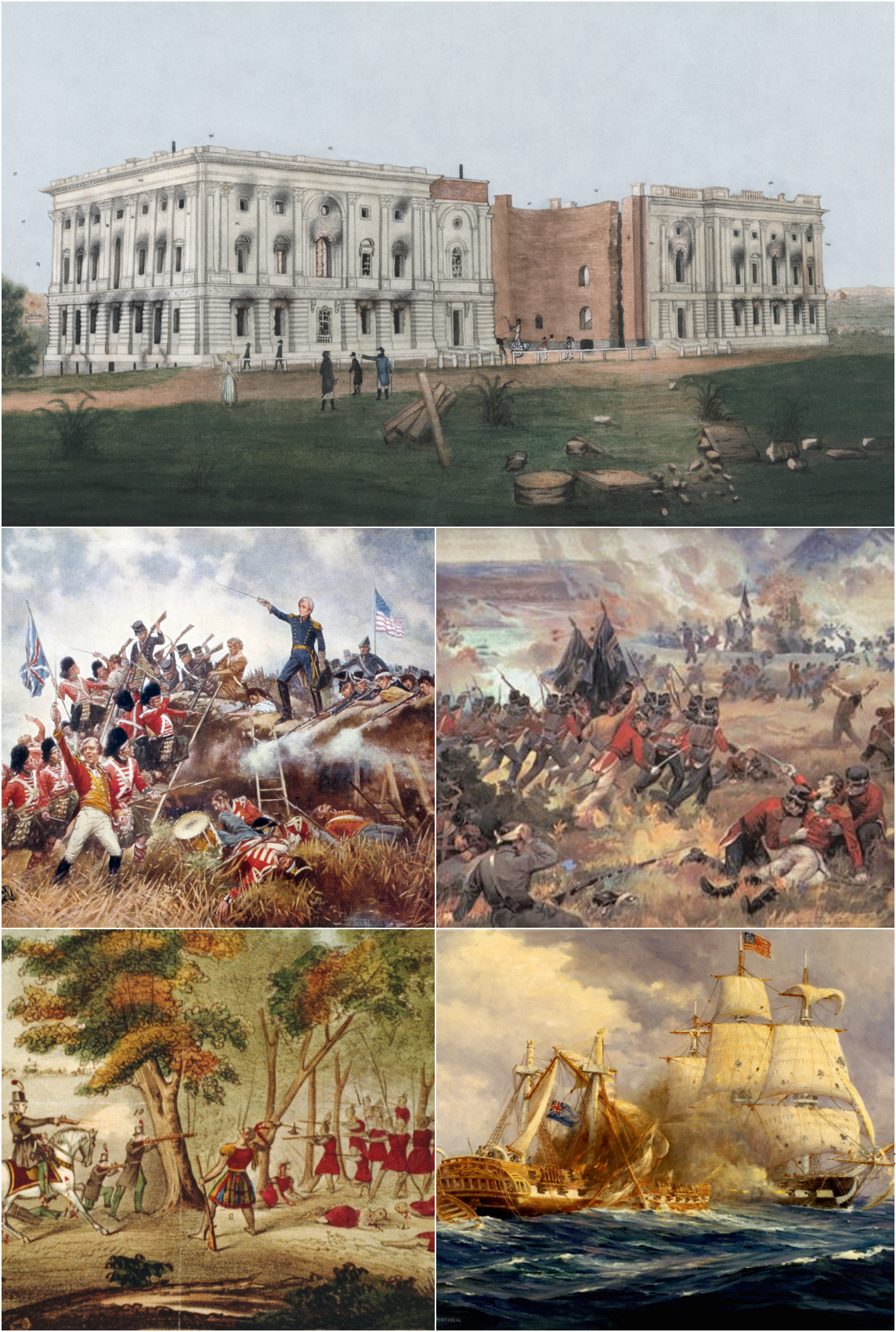
- Clockwise from top: Damage to the United States Capitol after the burning of Washington; Mortally wounded Isaac Brock spurs on the York Volunteers at the Battle of Queenston Heights; USS Constitution vs HMS Guerriere; The death of Tecumseh in 1813; Andrew Jackson defeats the British assault on New Orleans in 1815
| Date | 18 June 1812 – 17 February 1815 |
| Location | North America; Atlantic Ocean; Pacific Ocean |
| Result | Inconclusive (Note: see Results of the War of 1812) |

Belligerents
| United States; Cherokee; Chickasaw; Choctaw; Lower Creek; Tuscarora | United Kingdom; Tecumseh's confederacy; Red Sticks; Menominee; Six Nations of the Grand River; (Spain) West Florida (1813–1814) |

Commanders and leaders
| (United States) James Madison; (United States) John Rodgers; (United States) Stephen Decatur; (United States) Andrew Jackson; (United States) Jacob Brown; (United States) William Henry Harrison; (United States) William Hull; (United States) Winfield Scott | (United Kingdom of Great Britain and Ireland) The Earl of Liverpool; (United Kingdom of Great Britain and Ireland) Phineas Riall; (United Kingdom of Great Britain and Ireland) Alexander Cochrane; (United Kingdom of Great Britain and Ireland) George Prevost; (United Kingdom of Great Britain and Ireland) Isaac Brock †; (United Kingdom of Great Britain and Ireland) Robert Ross †; (United Kingdom of Great Britain and Ireland) Edward Pakenham †; (United Kingdom of Great Britain and Ireland) Samuel Gibbs (DOW); Tecumseh †; Roundhead # |

Strength
| (United States) 7,000 troops (at war's start); (United States) 35,800 troops (at war's end); (United States) 3,049 Rangers; 458,463 militia; (United States) 12 frigates; (United States) 14 other vessels; 515 privateer ships | (United Kingdom of Great Britain and Ireland) 5,200 troops (at war's start); (United Kingdom of Great Britain and Ireland) 48,160 troops (at war's end); 4,000 active sedentary Canadian Militia in Upper Canada & 2,000 in Lower Canada (active/being trained as of 1812-13); c. 45,000 listed in muster rolls, pay lists and other documents over the course of the war; (United Kingdom of Great Britain and Ireland) 11 ships of the line; (United Kingdom of Great Britain and Ireland) 34 frigates; (United Kingdom of Great Britain and Ireland) 52 other vessels; 9 Provincial Marine ships (at war's start); 10,000–15,000 Native American allies; 500 Spanish garrison troops (Pensacola) |

Casualties and losses
| 2,200 killed in action; 5,200 died of disease; Up to 15,000 deaths from all causes; 4,505 wounded; 20,000 captured; 8 frigates captured or burned; 1,400 merchant ships captured; 278 privateers captured; 4,000 slaves escaped or freed | 2,700 died in combat; 10,000 died from all causes (Note: Includes 2,250 men of the Royal Navy.) (Note: Includes 1,600+ fallen serving in Canadian Militia and Fencible units, as well as known individuals from Crown Indigenous allies); 15,500 captured; 6 frigates captured or burnt; 56 small warships lost; ~1,344 merchant ships captured (373 recaptured); 10,000 Indigenous warriors and civilians dead from all causes (Note: Includes 1,000 combat casualties on the northern front.); 14 Spanish killed and 6 wounded |

The War of 1812 was a conflict initiated by the United States against the United Kingdom and its allies fought mainly in North America and at sea during the wider Napoleonic Wars. The United States declared war on Britain on 18 June 1812. Although peace terms were agreed upon in the December 1814 Treaty of Ghent, the war did not officially end until the peace treaty was ratified by the United States Senate on 17 February 1815.

The United States objected to British restrictions on American trade with Napoleonic France and to the Royal Navy's impressment of seamen from American vessels, including men the United States considered American citizens. Opinion in the US was split on how to respond, and although majorities in both the House and Senate voted for war in June 1812, they were divided along strict party lines, with the Democratic-Republican Party in favour and the Federalist Party against. (Note: The House declared war by 61.7% with a majority in all sections, 20 Members not voting, and the Senate was closer at 59.4%, four not voting. The former Federalist stronghold in Massachusetts had one Democrat-Republican and one Federalist for US Senators, with ten Democrat-Republicans and seven Federalists in the House. Only two states had both Senators in the Federalist Party: Connecticut with 7 Federalist Representatives, and Maryland with 7 Democrat-Republicans and 3 Federalists in the House.) News of British concessions made in an attempt to avoid war did not reach the US until late July, by which time the conflict was already underway. Britain, engaged in a series of conflicts against France, defended its maritime system as necessary to the defeat of Napoleon and treated many impressed sailors as British subjects. Tensions were also intensified by British relations with Indigenous confederacies resisting American expansion in the Old Northwest.

British war aims were initially limited and defensive: to protect Canada (then British North America), maintain maritime rights, and avoid diverting major resources from the war in Europe. The United States, by contrast, launched repeated invasions of Upper and Lower Canada, all of which failed. At sea, the Royal Navy imposed an increasingly effective blockade of the American coast, while American privateers and naval victories inflicted localised, limited damage on British commerce and prestige.

As a result of Napoleon's exile in April 1814 following the War of the Sixth Coalition, Britain reinforced North America and expanded operations against the United States, including the capture and burning of Washington in August 1814. American victories at Baltimore and Plattsburgh in September helped end major fighting in the northern theatre. In the southeast, American forces and allied Indigenous groups defeated the Red Stick faction of the Muscogee, while Andrew Jackson's army repulsed a British attack on New Orleans in January 1815, after the Treaty of Ghent had already been signed but before news of peace reached the region.

The Treaty of Ghent restored the pre-war territorial status quo and did not settle the maritime issues that had contributed to the war. Impressment largely ceased after 1815 because the end of the Napoleonic Wars removed Britain's wartime manpower emergency, but Britain did not formally renounce its wider maritime claims in the treaty. Later Anglo-American disputes over the stopping, visiting, searching, and seizure of American vessels continued in narrower contexts, especially anti-slave-trade enforcement, and rare American allegations of post-war impressment appeared in diplomatic correspondence in the 1820s.

== Origins ==
External videos
- The War of 1812 – PBS - (1h 53m 13s)

The origins of the War of 1812 (1812–1815), between the United States and the United Kingdom's British Empire and their First Nation allies, have been long debated. Multiple factors led to the US declaration of war on Great Britain that began the War of 1812:

- Trade restrictions introduced by the UK under the orders in council of 1807 to impede trade with France, with whom Britain was at war (the US contested the restrictions as illegal under contemporary international law).
- The impressment (forced recruitment) of seamen on US vessels into the British Royal Navy (men whom Britain claimed were British subjects).
- British military support for American Indian tribes who were offering armed resistance against the US expansion of the American frontier in the Northwest Territory.
- A possible desire by the US to annex some or all of Canada.
- US desire to uphold national honor in the face of what they considered to be British insults, such as the Chesapeake affair.

American expansion into the Northwest Territory (now Ohio, Indiana, Michigan, Illinois, Wisconsin, and northeast Minnesota) was impeded by Native American raids. Some historians maintain that an American goal in the war was to annex some or all of Canada, a view many Canadians still share. However, many argue that inducing the fear of such a seizure was merely an American tactic, which was designed to obtain a bargaining chip.

Some members of the British Parliament and dissident American politicians such as John Randolph of Roanoke claimed that American expansionism, rather than maritime disputes, was the primary motivation for the American declaration of war. That view has been retained by some historians.

Although the British made some concessions before the war on neutral trade, they insisted on the right to reclaim their deserting sailors. The British also had long had a goal to create a large "neutral" Native American state that would cover much of Ohio, Indiana, and Michigan. They made the demand as late as 1814 at the Ghent Peace Conference, but they lost battles that would have upheld those claims.

== Names ==
The War of 1812 has been referred to by different names, often reflecting national memory as much as contemporary usage. In Britain, the war is sometimes referred to as "The American War of 1812" in order to distinguish it from the Napoleonic Wars, which were occurring at the same time. British accounts have often treated the conflict as a secondary theatre of the wider struggle against Napoleon, while Canadian and American memory have given it greater national significance.

The Federalist Party, which was staunchly against the war, referred to it as "Mr. Madison's War" or "Madison's War", linking the conflict directly to President James Madison and the Republican administration that had requested the declaration.

In the United States, the war has sometimes been remembered as the "Second War of American Independence" or the "Second American Revolution". Historians of public memory have treated these labels as later American nationalist interpretations rather than descriptions grounded in the war's stated aims or treaty settlement. Historian Matthew Dennis writes that the claim that the war was America's "Second War of Independence" had not caught on in the 1880s and "nor has it since", and describes the war's popular legacy as thin, poorly informed, and "more mythic" than historically grounded. Historian Donald R. Hickey similarly argues that the Battle of New Orleans had no impact on the peace settlement but had a lasting effect on how Americans remembered the war, helping to support a triumphant national memory that was not matched by the treaty outcome, which secured no American concessions on impressment, neutral maritime rights, or Canadian territory.

Several historians have questioned the "Second War of Independence" framing because it does not align closely with the war's stated causes, military objectives, or treaty outcome. Britain did not seek to reconquer the United States, the United States initiated the war over maritime grievances and territorial disputes, and the Treaty of Ghent did not secure American concessions on impressment, neutral maritime rights, or British maritime belligerent claims. The Office of the Historian of the United States Department of State describes the causes of the war as extending beyond commerce and neutral rights to include western expansion, relations with American Indians, and territorial control of North America.

In Canada, where the war was fought largely as a defence of British North America, public memory has often treated the conflict as a successful defence against American invasion and, in popular terms, as a Canadian victory. Canada was not yet a sovereign state, but the later Canadian interpretation centred on the fact that repeated American invasions were repulsed and British North America remained outside the United States. The Canadian War Museum describes the war as one in which the Royal Navy, British Army, Canadian regulars, Canadian militia, and First Peoples warriors "successfully defended Canada", while the National Army Museum states that the Treaty of Ghent secured Britain's Canadian possessions and that their successful defence helped initiate a new sense of Canadian identity. Government of Canada material similarly presents the American invasion as a mistaken attempt to conquer Canada and notes the role of British troops, Canadian settler militias, First Nations warriors, and Métis fighters in defending the British territories. Amanda Foreman notes that Canadian memory has often centred on the successful repulse of American incursions, while the war has remained far less prominent in British public memory because it was overshadowed by the Napoleonic Wars.

== Forces ==
=== American ===
During the years 1810–1812, American naval ships were divided into two major squadrons, with the "northern division", based at New York, commanded by Commodore John Rodgers, and the "southern division", based at Norfolk, commanded by Commodore Stephen Decatur.

Although not much of a threat to Canada in 1812, the United States Navy was a well-trained and professional force comprising over 5,000 sailors and marines. It had 14 warships with three of its five "super-frigates" non-operational at the onset of the war. Its principal problem was lack of funding, as many members of Congress did not see the need for a strong navy. The biggest ships in the American navy were frigates and there were no ships-of-the-line capable of engaging in a fleet action with the Royal Navy. On the high seas, the Americans pursued a strategy of commerce raiding, capturing or sinking British merchantmen with their frigates and privateers. The Navy was largely concentrated on the Atlantic coast before the war as it had only two gunboats on Lake Champlain, one brig on Lake Ontario and another brig in Lake Erie when the war began.

The United States Army was initially much larger than the British Army in North America. Many men carried their own long rifles while the British were issued muskets, except for one unit of 500 riflemen. Leadership was inconsistent in the American officer corps as some officers proved themselves to be outstanding, but many others were inept, owing their positions to political favours. Congress was hostile to a standing army and the government called out 450,000 men from the state militias during the war. The state militias were poorly trained, armed, and led. The failed invasion of Lake Champlain led by General Dearborn illustrates this. The British Army soundly defeated the Maryland and Virginia militias at the Battle of Bladensburg in 1814 and President Madison commented "I could never have believed so great a difference existed between regular troops and a militia force, if I had not witnessed the scenes of this day". As the war progressed, the army resorted to harsher discipline, including increasing use of the death penalty, in order to maintain discipline.

=== British ===
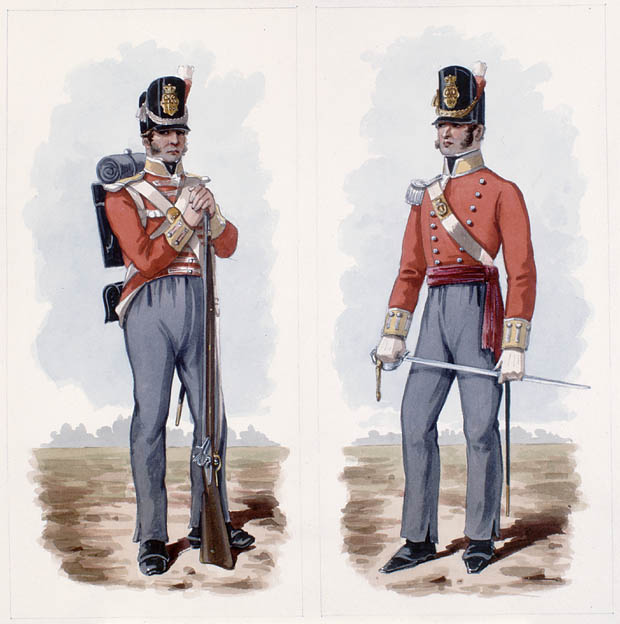
Depiction of a British private soldier (left) and officer (right) of the period

The United States was only a secondary concern to Britain, so long as the Napoleonic Wars continued with France. In 1813, France had 80 ships-of-the-line and was building another 35. Containing the French fleet was the main British naval concern, leaving only the ships on the North American and Jamaica Stations immediately available. In Upper Canada, the British had the Provincial Marine. While largely unarmed, they were essential for keeping the army supplied since the roads were abysmal in Upper Canada. At the onset of war, the Provincial Marine had four small armed vessels on Lake Ontario, three on Lake Erie and one on Lake Champlain. The Provincial Marine greatly outnumbered anything the Americans could bring to bear on the Great Lakes.

When the war broke out, the British Army in North America numbered 9,777 men in regular units and fencibles. (Note: units raised for local service but otherwise on the same terms as regulars) While the British Army was engaged in the Peninsular War, few reinforcements were available. Although the British were outnumbered, the long-serving regulars and fencibles were better trained and more professional than the hastily expanded United States Army. The militias of Upper Canada and Lower Canada were initially far less effective, but substantial numbers of full-time militia were raised during the war and played pivotal roles in several engagements, including the Battle of the Chateauguay which caused the Americans to abandon the Saint Lawrence River theatre.

=== Indigenous peoples ===
The highly decentralized bands and tribes considered themselves allies of, and not subordinates to, the British or the Americans. Various tribes fighting with United States forces provided them with their "most effective light troops" while the British needed indigenous allies to compensate for their numerical inferiority. The indigenous allies of the British, Tecumseh's confederacy in the west and Haudenosaunee in the east, avoided pitched battles and relied on irregular warfare, including raids and ambushes that took advantage of their knowledge of terrain. In addition, they were highly mobile, able to march 30–50 miles (50–80 km) a day.

Their leaders sought to fight only under favourable conditions and would avoid any battle that promised heavy losses, doing what they thought best for their tribes. The indigenous fighters saw no issue with withdrawing if needed to save casualties. They always sought to surround an enemy, where possible, to avoid being surrounded and make effective use of the terrain. Their main weapons were a mixture of muskets, rifles, bows, tomahawks, knives and swords, as well as clubs and other melee weapons, which sometimes had the advantage of being quieter than guns.

== Declaration of war ==
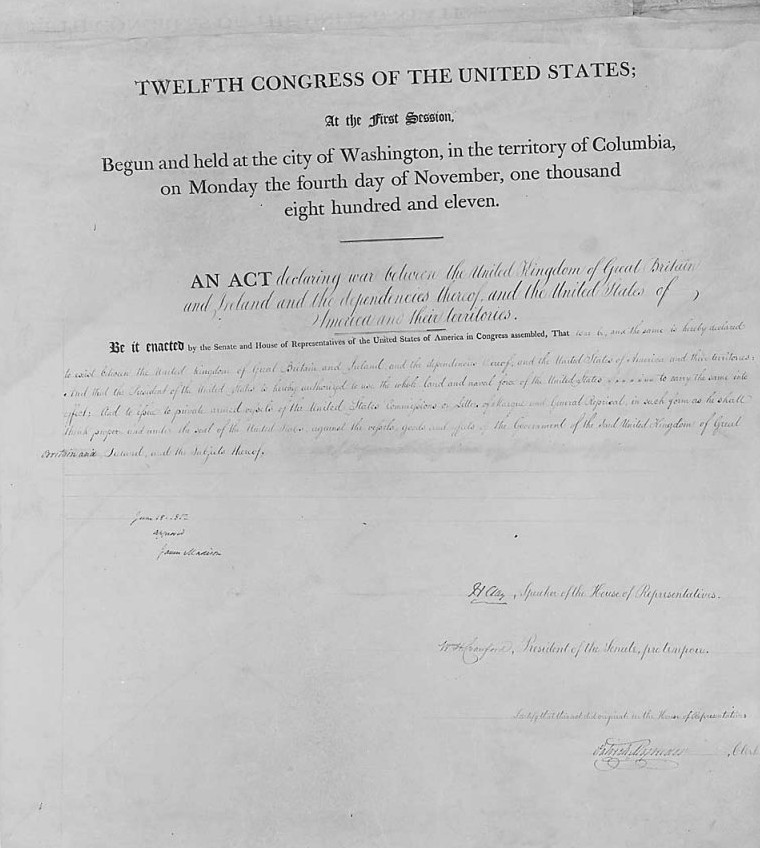
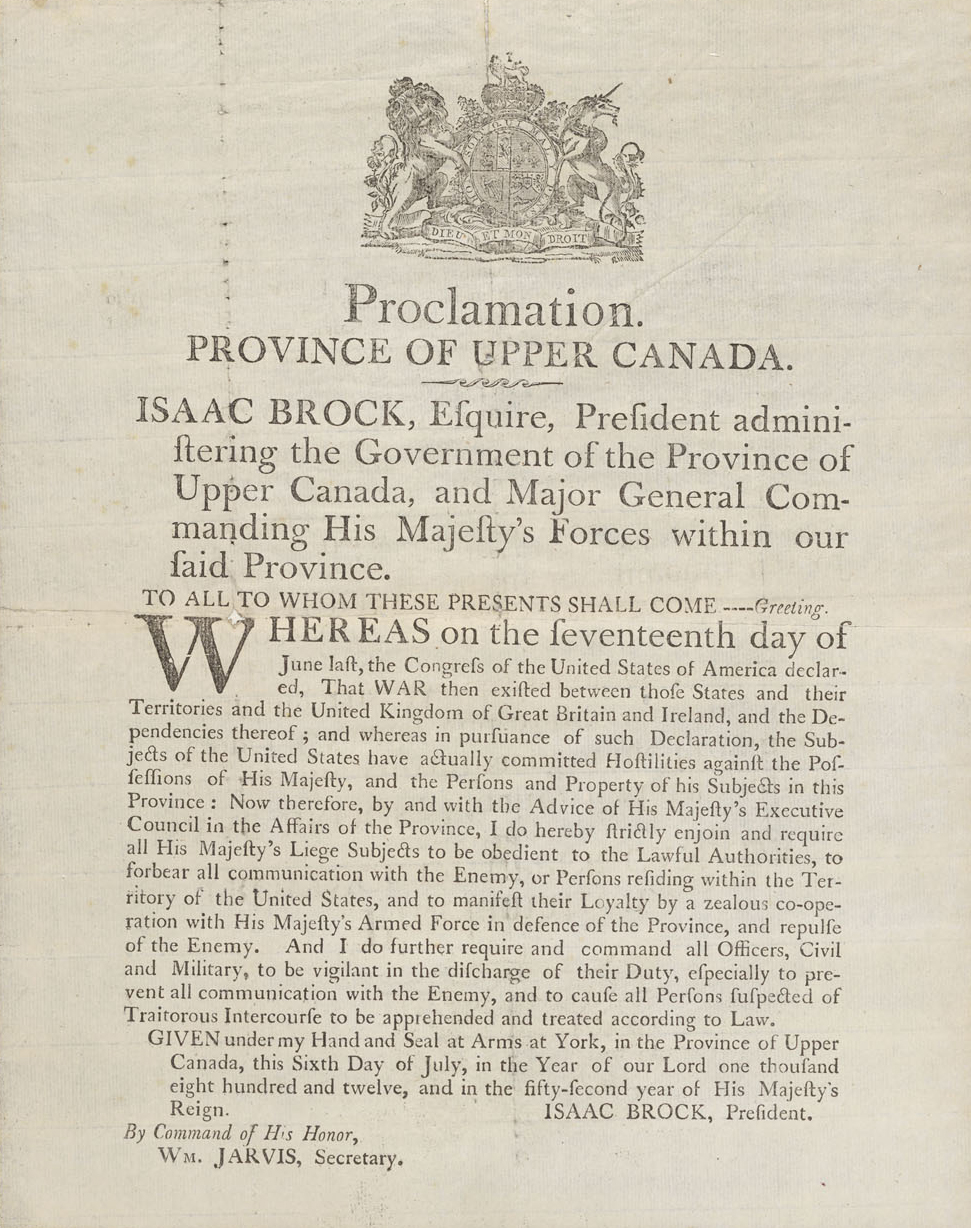
The United States Declaration of War (left) and Isaac Brock's Proclamation in response to it (right)

War declaration vote in the United States House of Representatives

On 1 June 1812, Madison sent a message to Congress recounting American grievances against Great Britain, though not specifically calling for a declaration of war. The House of Representatives then deliberated for four days behind closed doors before voting 79 to 49 (61%) in favour of the first declaration of war. The Senate concurred in the declaration by a 19 to 13 (59%) vote in favour. The declaration focused mostly on maritime issues, especially involving British blockades, with two thirds of the indictment devoted to such impositions, initiated by Britain's Orders in Council. (Note: Hickey) The conflict began formally on 18 June 1812, when Madison signed the measure into law. He proclaimed it the next day. This was the first time that the United States had formally declared war on another nation, and the Congressional vote was approved by the smallest margin of any declaration of war in America's history. None of the 39 Federalists in Congress voted in favour of the war, while other critics referred to it as "Mr. Madison's War". Just days after war had been declared, a small number of Federalists in Baltimore were attacked for printing anti-war views in a newspaper, which eventually led to over a month of deadly rioting in the city.

British commander Isaac Brock in Upper Canada received the news much faster. He issued a proclamation alerting citizens to the state of war and urging all military personnel "to be vigilant in the discharge of their duty", so as to prevent communication with the enemy and to arrest anyone suspected of helping the Americans. He also ordered the British garrison of Fort St. Joseph on Lake Huron to capture the American fort at Mackinac. This fort commanded the passage between Lakes Huron and Michigan, which was important to the fur trade. The British garrison, aided by fur traders of the North West Company and Sioux, Menominee, Winnebago, Chippewa, and Ottawa, immediately besieged and captured Mackinac.

== Course of war ==
The war was conducted in several theatres:

1. The Canada–United States border: the Great Lakes region (Old Northwest and Upper Canada), the Niagara Frontier, and the St. Lawrence River (New England and Lower Canada).
2. At sea, principally the Atlantic Ocean, the American east coast and Maritime Canada.
3. The Gulf Coast and Southern United States (including the Creek War in the Alabama River basin).
4. The Mississippi River basin.

=== Unpreparedness ===
Northern theatre, War of 1812

The war had been preceded by years of diplomatic dispute, yet neither side was ready for war when it came. Britain was heavily engaged in the Napoleonic Wars, most of the British Army was deployed in the Peninsular War in Portugal and Spain, and the Royal Navy was blockading most of the coast of Europe. The number of British regular troops present in Canada in July 1812 was officially 6,034, supported by additional Canadian militia. Throughout the war, the British War Secretary was Earl Bathurst, who had few troops to spare for reinforcing North American defences during the first two years of the war. He urged Lieutenant General George Prevost to maintain a defensive strategy. Prevost, who had the trust of the Canadians, followed these instructions and concentrated on defending Lower Canada at the expense of Upper Canada, which was more vulnerable to American attacks and allowed few offensive actions. Unlike campaigns along the east coast, Prevost had to operate with no support from the Royal Navy.

The United States was also not prepared for war. Madison had assumed that the state militias would easily seize Canada and that negotiations would follow. In 1812, the regular army consisted of fewer than 12,000 men. Congress authorized the expansion of the army to 35,000 men, but the service was voluntary and unpopular; it paid poorly and there were initially few trained and experienced officers. The militia objected to serving outside their home states. They were undisciplined and performed poorly against British forces when called upon to fight in unfamiliar territory. Multiple militias refused orders to cross the border and fight on Canadian soil.

American prosecution of the war suffered from its unpopularity, especially in New England where anti-war speakers were vocal. Massachusetts Congressmen Ebenezer Seaver and William Widgery were "publicly insulted and hissed" in Boston while a mob seized Plymouth's Chief Justice Charles Turner on 3 August 1812 "and kicked [him] through the town". The United States had great difficulty financing its war. It had disbanded its national bank, and private bankers in the Northeast were opposed to the war, but it obtained financing from London-based Barings Bank to cover overseas bond obligations. New England failed to provide militia units or financial support, which was a serious blow, and New England states made loud threats to secede as evidenced by the Hartford Convention. Britain exploited these divisions, opting to not blockade the ports of New England for much of the war and encouraging smuggling.

=== War in the West ===
==== Invasions of Canada, 1812 ====
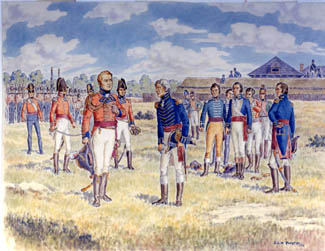
American surrender of Detroit, August 1812

An American army commanded by William Hull invaded Upper Canada on July 12, arriving at Sandwich (Windsor, Ontario) after crossing the Detroit River. Hull issued a proclamation ordering all British subjects to surrender. The proclamation said that Hull wanted to free them from the "tyranny" of Great Britain, giving them the liberty, security, and wealth that his own country enjoyed – unless they preferred "war, slavery and destruction". He also threatened to kill any British soldier caught fighting alongside Indigenous fighters. Hull's proclamation only helped to stiffen resistance to the American attacks as he lacked artillery and supplies.

Hull withdrew to the American side of the river on 7 August 1812 after receiving news of a Shawnee ambush on Major Thomas Van Horne's 200 men, who had been sent to support the American supply convoy. Hull also faced a lack of support from his officers and fear among his troops of a possible massacre by unfriendly Indigenous forces. A group of 600 troops led by Lieutenant Colonel James Miller remained in Canada, attempting to supply the American position in the Sandwich area, with little success.

Major General Isaac Brock believed that he should take bold measures to calm the settler population in Canada and to convince the tribes that Britain was strong. He moved to Amherstburg near the western end of Lake Erie with reinforcements and attacked Detroit, using Fort Malden as his stronghold. Hull feared that the British possessed superior numbers, and Fort Detroit lacked adequate gunpowder and cannonballs to withstand a long siege. He agreed to surrender Detroit on 16 August and the British began their of occupation of the Michigan Territory. Hull also ordered the evacuation of Fort Dearborn (Chicago) to Fort Wayne, but Potawatomi warriors ambushed them and escorted them back to the fort where they were massacred on 15 August. The fort was subsequently burned. (Note: Hull was later court-martialed for cowardice, neglect of duty and for lying about lack of supplies. He was convicted and sentenced to death, but President Madison granted him a pardon for his heroic service during the Revolutionary War.)

Brock moved to the eastern end of Lake Erie, where American General Stephen Van Rensselaer was attempting a second invasion. The Americans attempted an attack across the Niagara River on 13 October, but they were defeated at Queenston Heights. However, Brock was killed during the battle and British leadership suffered after his death. American General Henry Dearborn made a final attempt to advance north from Lake Champlain, but his militia refused to go beyond American territory.

==== American Northwest, 1813 ====
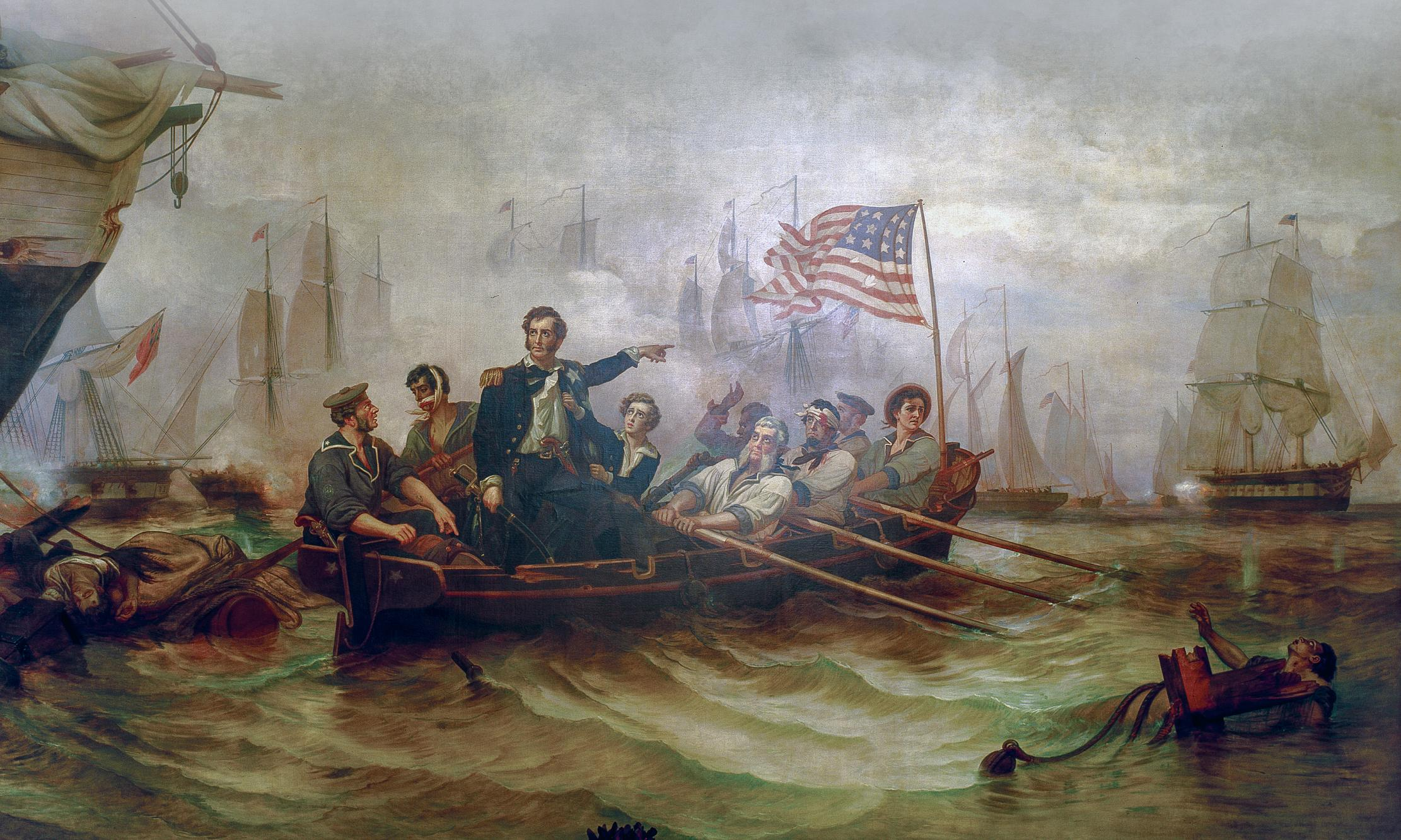
Oliver Hazard Perry's message to William Henry Harrison after the Battle of Lake Erie began thus: "We have met the enemy and they are ours".

After Hull surrendered Detroit, General William Henry Harrison took command of the American Army of the Northwest. He set out to retake the city, which was now defended by Colonel Henry Procter and Tecumseh. A detachment of Harrison's army was defeated at Frenchtown along the River Raisin on 22 January 1813. Procter left the prisoners with an inadequate guard and his Potawatomie allies killed and scalped 60 captive Americans. The defeat ended Harrison's campaign against Detroit, but "Remember the River Raisin!" became a rallying cry for the Americans.

In May 1813, Procter, Tecumseh, and Roundhead set siege to Fort Meigs in northwestern Ohio. Tecumseh's fighters ambushed American reinforcements who arrived during the siege, but the fort held out. The fighters eventually began to disperse, forcing Procter and Tecumseh to return to Canada. Along the way they attempted to storm Fort Stephenson, a small American post on the Sandusky River near Lake Erie. They were repulsed with serious losses, marking the end of the Ohio campaign.

Captain Oliver Hazard Perry fought the Battle of Lake Erie on 10 September 1813. His decisive victory at Put-in-Bay ensured American military control of the lake, improved American morale after a series of defeats and compelled the British to fall back from Detroit. This enabled General Harrison to launch another invasion of Upper Canada, which culminated in the American victory at the Battle of the Thames on 5 October 1813, where Tecumseh was killed.

==== American West, 1813–1815 ====
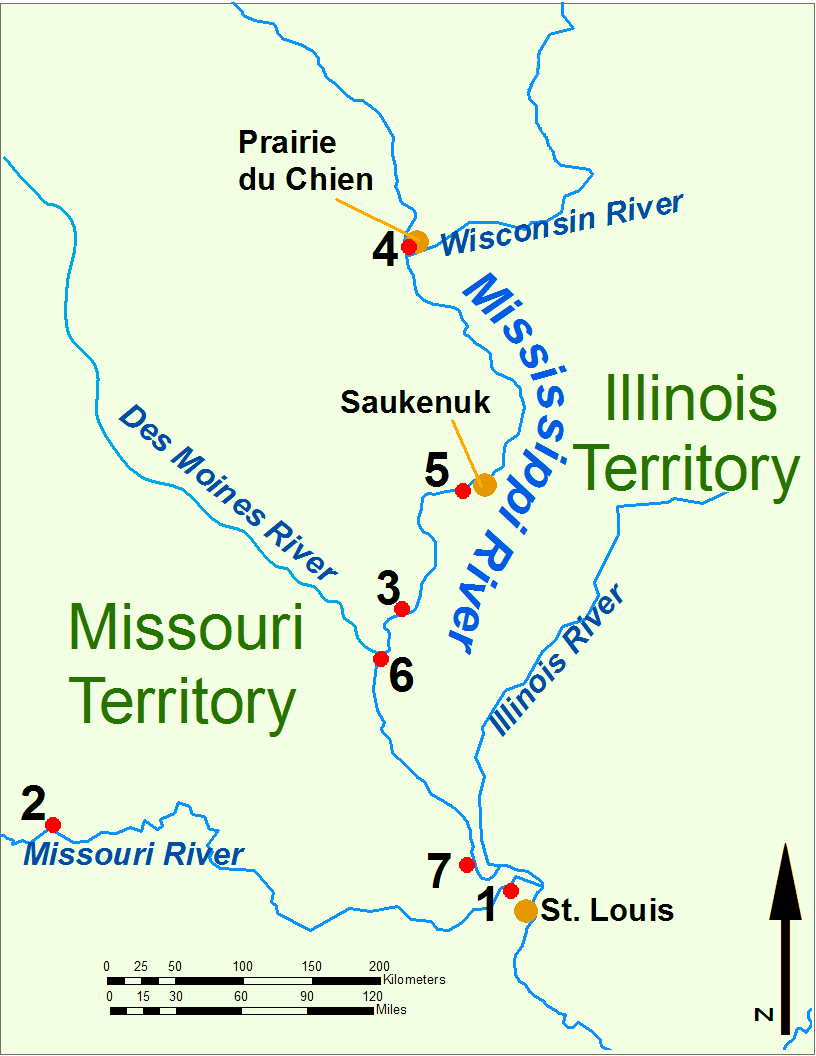
The Upper Mississippi River during the War of 1812: 1. Fort Belle Fontaine, American headquarters; 2. Fort Osage, abandoned in 1813; 3. Fort Madison, defeated in 1813; 4. Fort Shelby, defeated in 1814; 5. Battle of Rock Island Rapids, July 1814; and the Battle of Credit Island, September 1814; 6. Fort Johnson, abandoned in 1814; 7. Fort Cap au Gris and the Battle of the Sink Hole, May 1815

The Mississippi River valley was the western frontier of the United States in 1812. The territory acquired in the Louisiana Purchase of 1803 contained almost no American settlements west of the Mississippi except around St. Louis and a few forts and trading posts in the Boonslick. Fort Belle Fontaine was an old trading post converted to an Army post in 1804 and this served as regional headquarters. Fort Osage, built in 1808 along the Missouri River, was the westernmost American outpost, but it was abandoned at the start of the war. Fort Madison was built along the Mississippi in Iowa in 1808 and had been repeatedly attacked by British-allied Sauk since its construction. The United States Army abandoned Fort Madison in September 1813 after the indigenous fighters attacked it and besieged it – with support from the British. This was one of the few battles fought west of the Mississippi. Black Hawk played a leadership role.

The American victory on Lake Erie and the recapture of Detroit isolated the British on Lake Huron. In the winter a Canadian party under Lieutenant Colonel Robert McDouall established a new supply line from York to Nottawasaga Bay on Georgian Bay. He arrived at Fort Mackinac on 18 May with supplies and more than 400 militia and Indians, then sent an expedition which successfully besieged and recaptured the key trading post of Prairie du Chien, on the Upper Mississippi. The Americans dispatched a substantial expedition to relieve the fort, but Sauk, Fox, and Kickapoo warriors under Black Hawk ambushed it and forced it to withdraw with heavy losses in the Battle of Rock Island Rapids. In September 1814, the Sauk, Fox, and Kickapoo, supported by part of Prairie du Chien's British garrison, repulsed a second American force led by Major Zachary Taylor in the Battle of Credit Island. These victories enabled the Sauk, Fox, and Kickapoo to harass American garrisons further to the south, which led the Americans to abandon Fort Johnson, in central Illinois Territory. Consequently, the Americans lost control of almost all of Illinois Territory, although they held onto the St. Louis area and eastern Missouri. However, the Sauk raided even into these territories, clashing with American forces at the Battle of Cote Sans Dessein in April 1815 at the mouth of the Osage River in the Missouri Territory and the Battle of the Sink Hole in May 1815 near Fort Cap au Gris. This left the British and their Indian allies in control of most of modern Illinois and all of modern Wisconsin.

Meanwhile, the British were supplying the Indians in the Old Northwest from Montreal via Mackinac. On 3 July, the Americans sent a force of five vessels from Detroit to recapture Mackinac. A mixed force of regulars and volunteers from the militia landed on the island on 4 August. They did not attempt to achieve surprise, and Indians ambushed them in the brief Battle of Mackinac Island and forced them to re-embark. The Americans discovered the new base at Nottawasaga Bay and on 13 August they destroyed its fortifications and the schooner Nancy that they found there. They then returned to Detroit, leaving two gunboats to blockade Mackinac. On 4 September, the British surprised, boarded, and captured both gunboats. These engagements on Lake Huron left Mackinac under British control.

The British returned Mackinac and other captured territory to the United States after the war. Some British officers and Canadians objected to handing back Prairie du Chien and especially Mackinac under the terms of the Treaty of Ghent. However, the Americans retained the captured post at Fort Malden near Amherstburg until the British complied with the treaty. Fighting between Americans, the Sauk and other indigenous tribes continued through 1817, well after the war ended in the east.

=== War in the American Northeast ===
==== Niagara frontier, 1813 ====
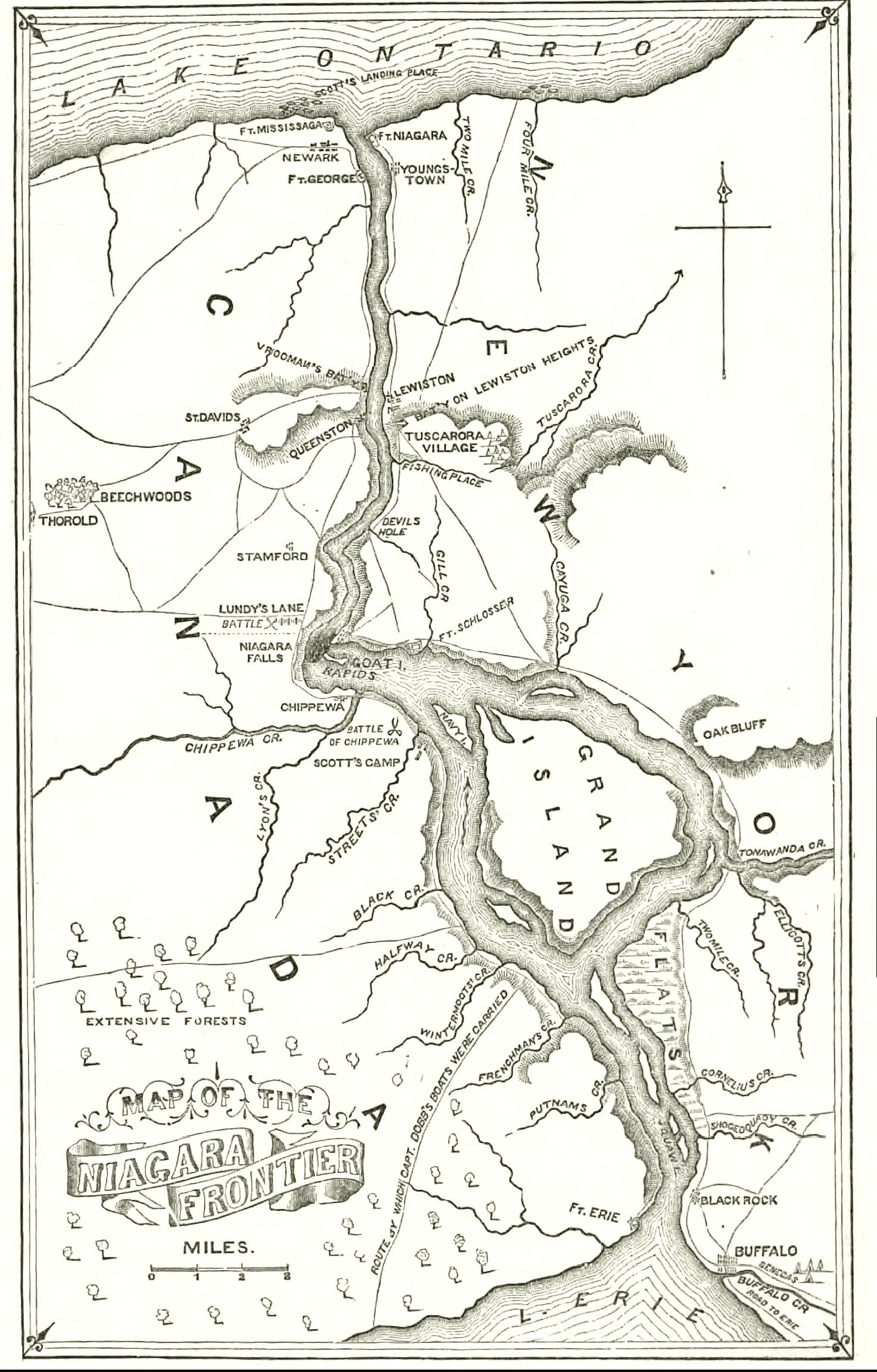
Niagara Peninsula, War of 1812 map depicting locations of forts, battles, etc.

Both sides placed great importance on gaining control of the Great Lakes and the St. Lawrence River because of the difficulties of land-based communication. The British already had a small squadron of warships on Lake Ontario when the war began and had the initial advantage. The Americans established a Navy yard at Sackett's Harbor, New York, a port on Lake Ontario. Commodore Isaac Chauncey took charge of the thousands of sailors and shipwrights assigned there and recruited more from New York. They completed a warship (the corvette USS Madison) in 45 days. Ultimately, almost 3,000 men at the shipyard built 11 warships and many smaller boats and transports. Army forces were also stationed at Sackett's Harbor, where they camped out through the town, far surpassing the small population of 900. Officers were housed with families. Madison Barracks was later built at Sackett's Harbor.

Having regained the advantage by their rapid building program, on 27 April 1813 Chauncey and Dearborn attacked York, the capital of Upper Canada. At the Battle of York, the outnumbered British regulars destroyed the fort and dockyard and retreated, leaving the militia to surrender the town. American soldiers set fire to the Legislature building, and looted and vandalized several government buildings and citizens' homes. The burning of York was pivotal for the British, and resulted in the absence of supplies that would be needed in later battles.

On 25 May 1813, Fort Niagara and the American Lake Ontario squadron began bombarding Fort George. An American amphibious force assaulted Fort George on the northern end of the Niagara River on 27 May and captured it without serious losses. The British abandoned Fort Erie and headed towards Burlington Heights. The British position was close to collapsing in Upper Canada; the Haudenosaunee considered changing sides and ignored a British appeal to come to their aid. However, the Americans did not pursue the retreating British forces until they had largely escaped and organized a counter-offensive at the Battle of Stoney Creek on 5 June. The British launched a surprise attack at 2 a.m., leading to confused fighting and a strategic British victory.

The Americans pulled back to Forty Mile Creek rather than continue their advance into Upper Canada. At this point, the Six Nations of the Grand River began to come out to fight for the British as an American victory no longer seemed inevitable. The Haudenosaunee ambushed an American patrol at Forty Mile Creek while the Royal Navy squadron based in Kingston sailed in and bombarded the American camp. General Dearborn retreated to Fort George, mistakenly believing that he was outnumbered and outgunned. British Brigadier General John Vincent was encouraged when about 800 Haudenosaunee arrived to assist him.

An American force surrendered on 24 June to a smaller British force due to advance warning by Laura Secord at the Battle of Beaver Dams, marking the end of the American offensive into Upper Canada. British Major General Francis de Rottenburg did not have the strength to retake Fort George, so he instituted a blockade, hoping to starve the Americans into surrender. Meanwhile, Commodore James Lucas Yeo had taken charge of the British ships on the lake and mounted a counterattack, which the Americans repulsed at the Battle of Sackett's Harbor. Thereafter, Chauncey and Yeo's squadrons fought two indecisive actions, off the Niagara on 7 August and at Burlington Bay on 28 September. Neither commander was prepared to take major risks to gain a complete victory.

Late in 1813, the Americans abandoned the Canadian territory that they occupied around Fort George. They set fire to the village of Newark (now Niagara-on-the-Lake) on 10 December 1813, incensing the Canadians. Many of the inhabitants were left without shelter, freezing to death in the snow. The British retaliated following their Capture of Fort Niagara on 18 December 1813. A British-Indian force led by Major General Phineas Riall stormed the neighbouring town of Lewiston, New York on 19 December; four American civilians were killed by drunken Indians after the battle. A small force of Tuscarora warriors engaged Riall's men during the battle, which allowed many residents of Lewiston to evacuate the village. The British and their Indian allies subsequently attacked and burned Buffalo on Lake Erie on 30 December 1813 in revenge for the American attack on Fort George and Newark in May.

==== St. Lawrence and Lower Canada, 1813 ====
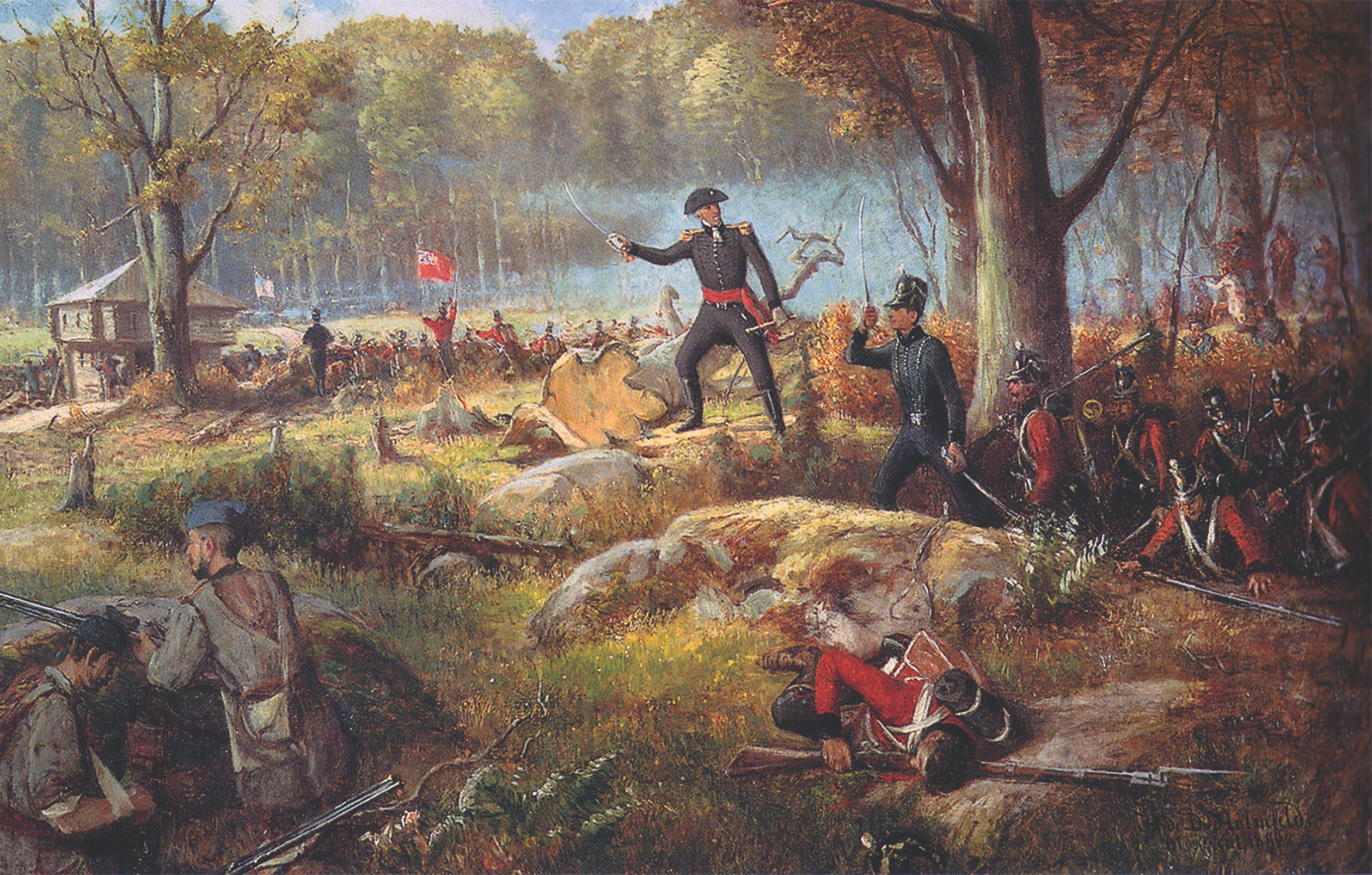
Fencibles, militia, and Mohawks repel an American attack on Montreal, Battle of the Chateauguay, October 1813

The British were vulnerable along the stretch of the St. Lawrence that was between Upper Canada and the United States. In the winter of 1812–1813, the Americans launched a series of raids from Ogdensburg, New York that hampered British supply traffic up the river. On 21 February, George Prevost passed through Prescott, Ontario on the opposite bank of the river with reinforcements for Upper Canada. When he left the next day, the reinforcements and local militia attacked in the Battle of Ogdensburg and the Americans were forced to retreat.

The Americans made two more thrusts against Montreal in 1813. Major General Wade Hampton was to march north from Lake Champlain and join a force under General James Wilkinson that would sail from Sackett's Harbor on Lake Ontario and descend the St. Lawrence. Hampton was delayed by road and supply problems and his intense dislike of Wilkinson limited his desire to support his plan. Charles de Salaberry defeated Hampton's force of 4,000 at the Chateauguay River on 25 October with a smaller force of Canadian Voltigeurs and Mohawks. Salaberry's force numbered only 339, but it had a strong defensive position. Wilkinson's force of 8,000 set out on 17 October, but it was delayed by weather. Wilkinson heard that a British force was pursuing him under Captain William Mulcaster and Lieutenant Colonel Joseph Wanton Morrison and landed near Morrisburg, Ontario by 10 November, about 150 kilometres (90 mi) from Montreal. On 11 November, his rear guard of 2,500 attacked Morrison's force of 800 at Crysler's Farm and was repulsed with heavy losses. He learned that Hampton could not renew his advance, retreated to the United States and settled into winter quarters. He resigned his command after a failed attack on a British outpost at Lacolle Mills.

==== Niagara and Plattsburgh campaigns, 1814 ====
British infantry at the Battle of Lundy's Lane

The Americans again invaded the Niagara frontier. They had occupied southwestern Upper Canada after they defeated Colonel Henry Procter at Moraviantown in October and believed that taking the rest of the province would force the British to cede it to them. The end of the war with Napoleon in Europe in April 1814 meant that the British could deploy their army to North America, so the Americans wanted to secure Upper Canada to negotiate from a position of strength. They planned to invade via the Niagara frontier while sending another force to recapture Mackinac. They captured Fort Erie on 3 July 1814. Unaware of Fort Erie's fall or of the size of the American force, Riall engaged with Winfield Scott, who won against a British force at the Battle of Chippawa on 5 July. The American forces had been through a hard training under Winfield Scott and proved to the professionals under fire. They deployed in a shallow U formation, bringing flanking fire and well-aimed volleys against Riall's men. Riall's men were chased off the battlefield.

An attempt to advance further ended with the hard-fought but inconclusive Battle of Lundy's Lane on July 25. The battle was fought several miles north of Chippawa Creek near Niagara Falls and is considered the bloodiest and costliest battle of the war. Both sides stood their ground as American General Jacob Brown pulled back to Fort George after the battle and the British did not pursue. British officers Riall, Scott, Brown, and Drummond were all wounded; Scott's wounds ended his service in the war.

The Americans withdrew but withstood a prolonged siege of Fort Erie. The British tried to storm Fort Erie on 14 August 1814, but they suffered heavy losses, losing 950 killed, wounded, and captured, compared to only 84 dead and wounded on the American side. The British were further weakened by exposure and shortage of supplies. Eventually, they raised the siege, but American Major General George Izard took over command on the Niagara front and followed up only halfheartedly. An American raid along the Grand River destroyed many farms and weakened British logistics. In October 1814, the Americans advanced into Upper Canada and engaged in skirmishes at Cook's Mill. They pulled back when they heard of the approach of the new British warship HMS St Lawrence, launched in Kingston that September and armed with 104 guns. The Americans lacked provisions and retreated across the Niagara after destroying Fort Erie.

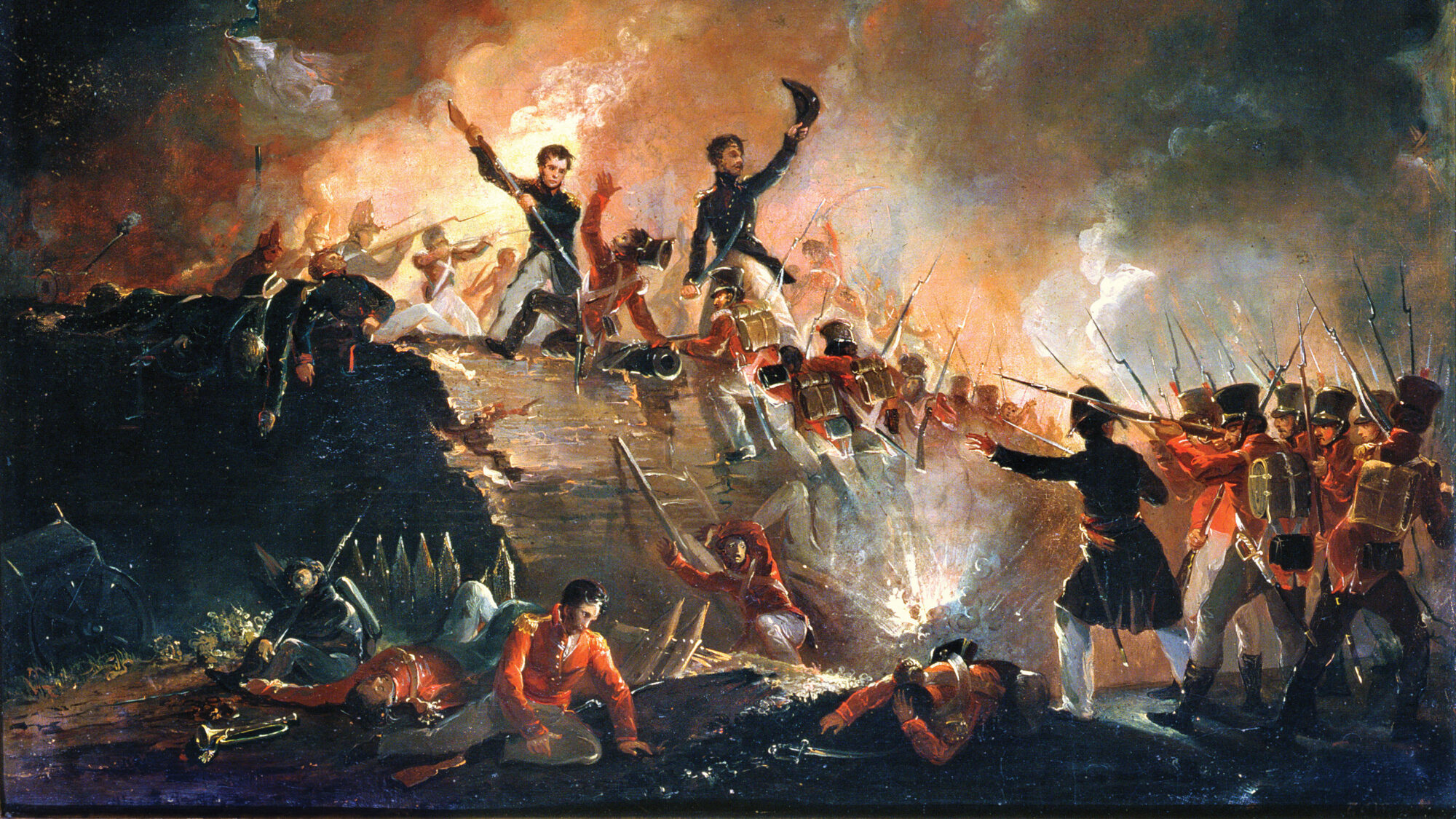
Unsuccessful British assault on Fort Erie, 14 August 1814

Meanwhile, after Napoleon abdicated, 15,000 British troops were sent to North America under four of Wellington's ablest brigade commanders. Fewer than half were veterans of the Peninsular War and the rest came from garrisons. Prevost was ordered to burn Sackett's Harbor to gain naval control of Lake Erie, Lake Ontario, and the Upper Lakes, and to defend Lower Canada from attack. He did defend Lower Canada but otherwise failed to achieve his objectives, so he decided to invade New York State. His army outnumbered the American defenders of Plattsburgh under General Alexander Macomb, but he was worried about his flanks and decided that he needed naval control of Lake Champlain. Upon reaching Plattsburgh, Prevost delayed the assault until Captain George Downie arrived in the hastily built 36-gun frigate HMS Confiance. Confiance was not fully completed, and her raw crew had never worked together, but Prevost forced Downie into a premature attack.

The British squadron on the lake was more evenly matched by the Americans under Master Commandant Thomas Macdonough. At the Battle of Plattsburgh on 11 September 1814, Confiance suffered heavy casualties and struck her colours, and the rest of the British fleet retreated. Prevost, already alienated from his veteran officers by insisting on proper dress codes, now lost their confidence, while Macdonough emerged as a national hero.

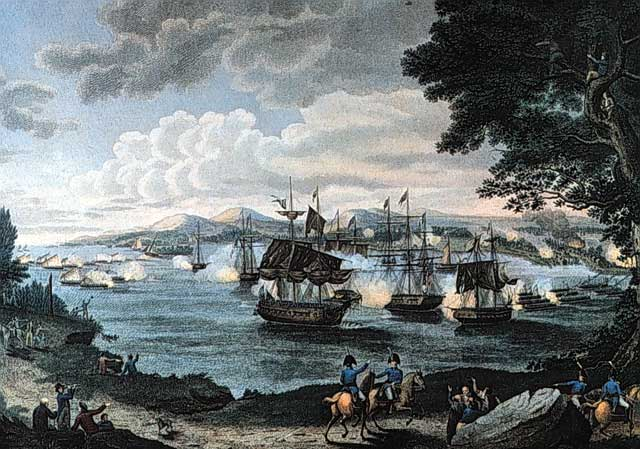
Defeat at Plattsburgh led Prevost to call off the invasion of New York.

The Americans now had control of Lake Champlain; Theodore Roosevelt later termed it "the greatest naval battle of the war".

Prevost then turned back, to the astonishment of his senior officers, saying that it was too hazardous to remain on enemy territory after the loss of naval supremacy. He was recalled to London, where a naval court-martial decided that defeat had been caused principally by Prevost urging the squadron into premature action and then failing to afford the promised support from the land forces. He died suddenly, just before his court-martial was to convene. His reputation sank to a new low as Canadians claimed that their militia under Brock did the job but Prevost failed. However, recent historians have been kinder. Peter Burroughs argues that his preparations were energetic, well-conceived, and comprehensive for defending the Canadas with limited means and that he achieved the primary objective of preventing an American conquest.

==== Occupation of Maine ====
Maine, then part of Massachusetts, was a base for smuggling and illegal trade between the United States and the British. Until 1813, the region was generally quiet except for privateer actions near the coast. In September 1813, the United States Navy's brig Enterprise fought and captured the Royal Navy brig Boxer off Pemaquid Point.

On 11 July 1814, Thomas Masterman Hardy took Moose Island (Eastport, Maine) without a shot and the entire American garrison, 65 men of Fort Sullivan peacefully surrendered. The British temporarily renamed the captured fort "Fort Sherbrooke". In September 1814, John Coape Sherbrooke led 3,000 British troops from his base in Halifax in the "Penobscot Expedition". In 26 days, he raided and looted Hampden, Bangor and Machias, destroying or capturing 17 American ships. He won the Battle of Hampden, with two killed while the Americans had one killed. Retreating American forces were forced to destroy the frigate Adams.

The British occupied the town of Castine and most of eastern Maine for the rest of the war, governing it under martial law and re-establishing the colony of New Ireland. The Treaty of Ghent returned this territory to the United States. When the British left in April 1815, they took £10,750 in tariff duties from Castine. This money, called the "Castine Fund", was used to establish Dalhousie University in Halifax. Decisions about the islands in Passamaquoddy Bay were decided by joint commission in 1817. However, Machias Seal Island had been seized by the British as part of the occupation and was unaddressed by the commission. While kept by Britain/Canada, it remains in dispute to this day.

=== Chesapeake campaign ===
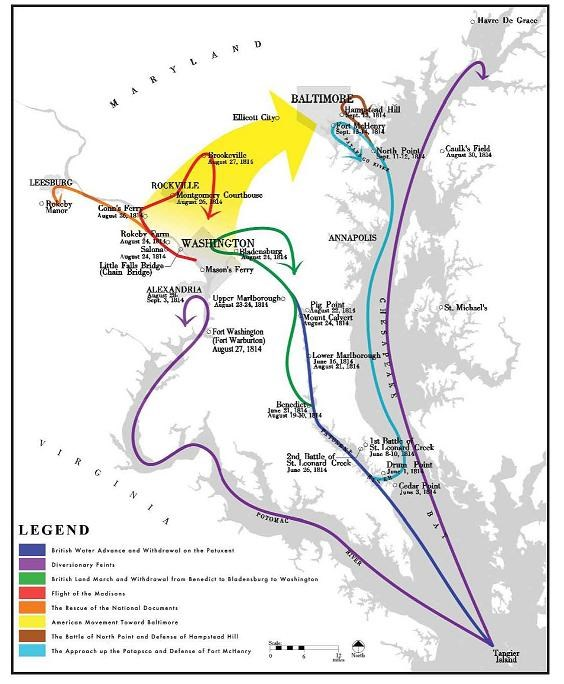
Map of the Chesapeake Campaign

The strategic location of the Chesapeake Bay near the Potomac River made it a prime target for the British. Rear Admiral George Cockburn arrived there in March 1813 and was joined by Admiral Warren who took command of operations ten days later. Starting in March a squadron under Cockburn started a blockade of the mouth of the Bay at Hampton Roads harbour and raided towns along the Bay from Norfolk, Virginia to Havre de Grace, Maryland. In late April Cockburn landed at and set fire to Frenchtown, Maryland and destroyed ships that were docked there. In the following weeks he routed the local militias and looted and burned three other towns. Thereafter he marched to iron foundry at Principio and destroyed it along with sixty-eight cannons.

On 4 July 1813, Commodore Joshua Barney, an American Revolutionary War naval officer, convinced the Navy Department to build the Chesapeake Bay Flotilla, a squadron of twenty barges powered by small sails or oars (sweeps) to defend the Chesapeake Bay. Launched in April 1814, the squadron was quickly cornered on the Patuxent River. While successful in harassing the Royal Navy, they could not stop subsequent British operations in the area.

==== Burning of Washington ====
In August 1814, a force of 2,500 soldiers under General Ross had just arrived in Bermuda aboard HMS Royal Oak, three frigates, three sloops and ten other vessels. Released from the Peninsular War by victory, the British intended to use them for diversionary raids along the coasts of Maryland and Virginia. In response to Prevost's request to retaliate against the property destruction done by American troops, they decided to employ this force, together with the naval and military units already on the station, to strike at the national capital. Anticipating the attack, valuable documents, including the original Constitution, were removed to Leesburg, Virginia. The British task force advanced up the Chesapeake, routing Commodore Barney's flotilla of gunboats, carried out the Raid on Alexandria, landed ground forces that bested the US defenders at the Battle of Bladensburg, and carried out the burning of Washington.

United States Secretary of War John Armstrong Jr. insisted that the British were going to attack Baltimore rather than Washington, even as British army and naval units were on their way to Washington. Brigadier General William H. Winder, who had burned several bridges in the area, assumed the British would attack Annapolis and was reluctant to engage because he mistakenly thought the British army was twice its size. The inexperienced state militia was easily routed in the Battle of Bladensburg, opening the route to Washington. British troops led by Major General Robert Ross, accompanied by Cockburn, the 3rd Brigade attacked and captured Washington with a force of 4,500. On 24 August, after the British had finished looting the interiors, Ross directed his troops to set fire to number of public buildings, including the White House and the United States Capitol. (Note: The task was directed by pyrotechnic experts Lieutenants George Lacy and George Pratt of the Royal Navy.) Extensive damage to the interiors and the contents of both were subsequently reported. US government and military officials fled to Virginia, while Secretary of the United States Navy William Jones ordered the Washington Navy Yard and a nearby fort to be razed in order to prevent its capture. Public buildings in Washington were destroyed by the British though private residences were ordered to be spared.

==== Siege of Fort McHenry ====
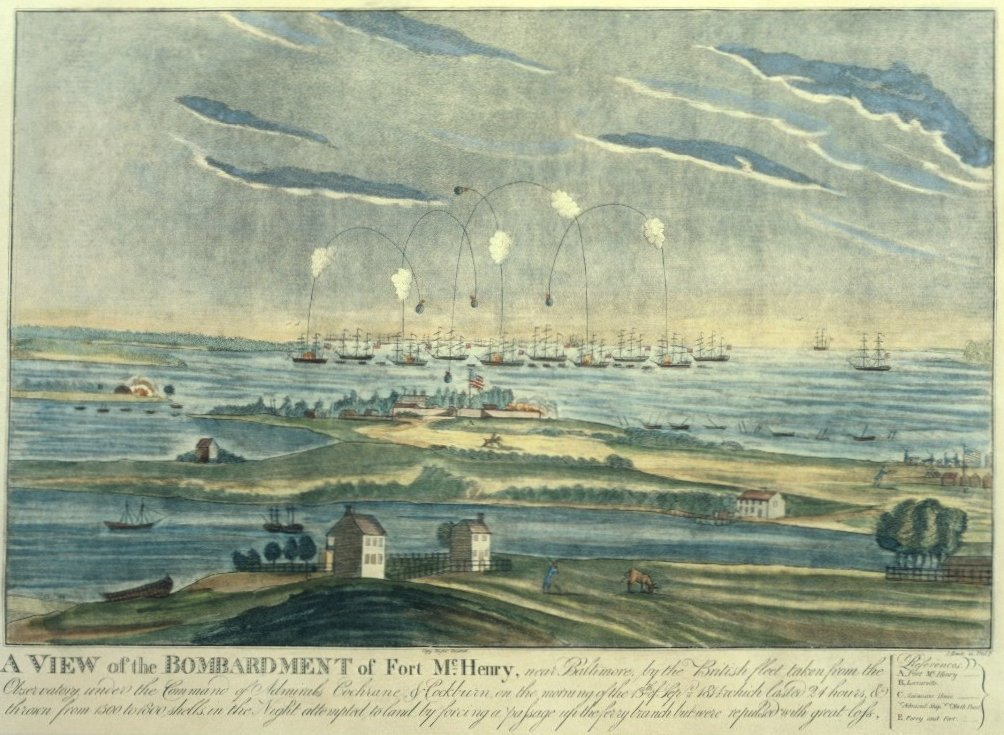
An artist's rendering of the bombardment at Fort McHenry during the Battle of Baltimore. Watching the bombardment from a truce ship, Francis Scott Key was inspired to write the four-stanza poem that later became "The Star-Spangled Banner".

After taking some munitions from the Washington Munitions depot, the British boarded their ships and moved on to their major target, the heavily fortified major city of Baltimore. Because some of their ships were held up in the Raid on Alexandria, they delayed their movement allowing Baltimore an opportunity to strengthen the fortifications and bring in new federal troops and state militia units. The "Battle for Baltimore" began with the British landing on 12 September 1814 at North Point, where they were met by American militia further up the Patapsco Neck peninsula. An exchange of fire began, with casualties on both sides. The British Army commander Major Gen. Robert Ross was killed by snipers. The British paused, then continued to march northwestward to face the stationed Maryland and Baltimore City militia units at Godly Wood. The Battle of North Point was fought for several hours in the afternoon in a musketry and artillery duel. The British also planned to simultaneously attack Baltimore by water on the following day, although the Royal Navy was unable to reduce Fort McHenry at the entrance to Baltimore Harbor in support of an attack from the northeast by the British Army.

The British eventually realized that they could not force the passage to attack Baltimore in coordination with the land force. A last-ditch night feint and barge attack during a heavy rainstorm was led by Captain Charles Napier around the fort up the Middle Branch of the river to the west. Split and misdirected partly in the storm, it turned back after suffering heavy casualties from the alert gunners of Fort Covington and Battery Babcock. The British called off the attack and sailed downriver to pick up their army, which had retreated from the east side of Baltimore. All the lights were extinguished in Baltimore the night of the attack, and the fort was bombarded for 25 hours. The only light was given off by the exploding shells over Fort McHenry, illuminating the flag that was still flying over the fort. The defence of the fort inspired the American lawyer Francis Scott Key to write "Defence of Fort M'Henry", a poem that was later set to music as "The Star-Spangled Banner".

=== Southern theatre ===
Because of the region's polyglot population, both the British and the Americans perceived the war in the Gulf South as a fundamentally different conflict from the one occurring in the Lowcountry and Chesapeake.

==== Creek War ====
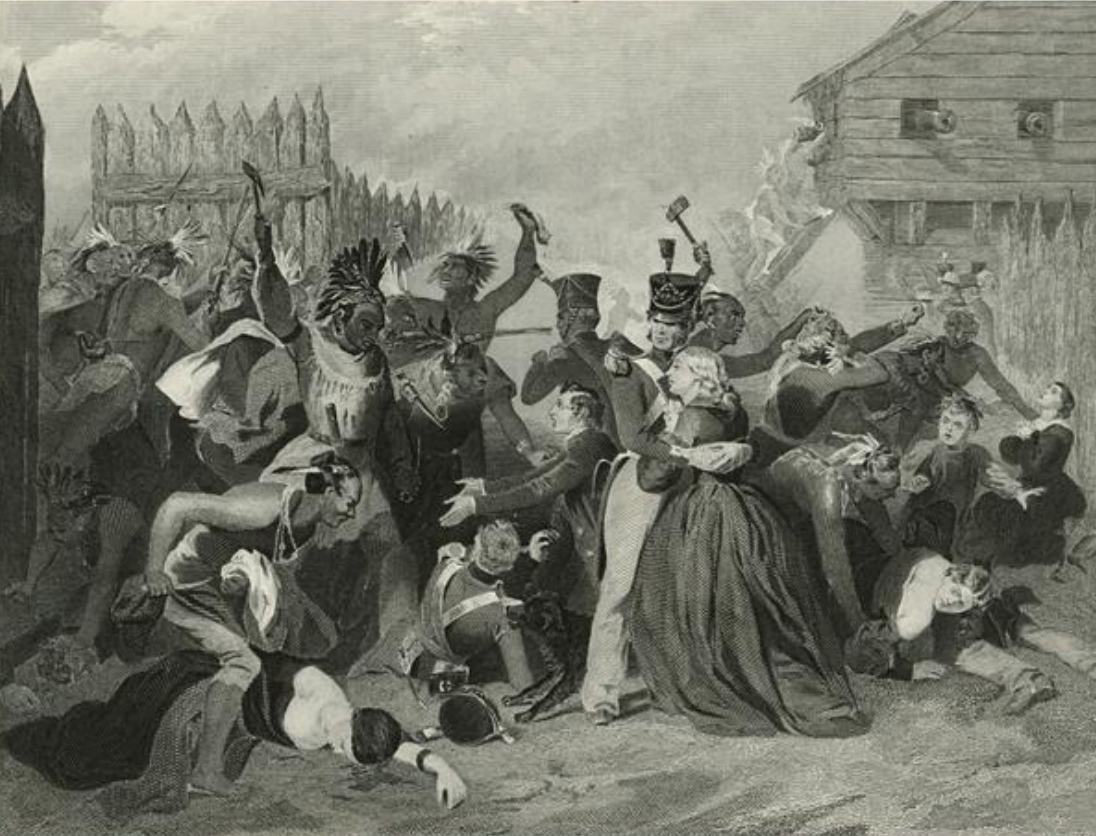
In 1813, Creek warriors attacked Fort Mims and killed 400 to 500 people. The massacre became a rallying point for Americans.

Before 1813, the war between the Creeks, or Muscogee, had been largely an internal affair sparked by the ideas of Tecumseh farther north in the Mississippi Valley. A faction known as the Red Sticks, so named for the colour of their war sticks, had broken away from the rest of the Creek Confederacy, which wanted peace with the United States. The Red Sticks were allied with Tecumseh, who had visited the Creeks about a year before 1813 and encouraged greater resistance to the Americans. The Creek Nation was a trading partner of the United States, actively involved with British and Spanish trade as well. The Red Sticks as well as many southern Muscogee people like the Seminole had a long history of alliance with the British and Spanish empires. This alliance helped the North American and European powers protect each other's claims to territory in the south.

On 27 July the Red Sticks were returning from Pensacola with a pack train filled with trade goods and arms when they were attacked by Americans who made off with their goods. On 30 August 1813, in retaliation for the raid, the Red Sticks, led by chiefs of the Creeks Red Eagle and Peter McQueen, attacked Fort Mims north of Mobile, the only American-held port in the territory of West Florida. The attack on Fort Mims resulted in the deaths of 400 refugee settlers, all butchered and scalped, including women and children, and became an ideological rallying point for the Americans. It prompted the state of Georgia and the Mississippi militia to immediately take major action against Creek offensives.

The Red Sticks chiefs gained power in the east along the Alabama River, Coosa River and Tallapoosa River in the Upper Creek territory. By contrast, the Lower Creek, who lived along the Chattahoochee River, generally opposed the Red Sticks and wanted to remain allied to the US Indian agent Benjamin Hawkins recruited Lower Creek to aid the 6th Military District under General Thomas Pinckney and the state militias against the Red Sticks. The United States combined forces were 5,000 troops from East and West Tennessee, with about 200 indigenous allies. At its peak, the Red Stick faction had 4,000 warriors, only a quarter of whom had muskets.

The Indian frontier of western Georgia was the most vulnerable but was partially fortified already. From November 1813 to January 1814, Georgia's militia and auxiliary Federal troops from the Creek and Cherokee indigenous nations and the states of North Carolina and South Carolina organized the fortification of defences along the Chattahoochee River and expeditions into Upper Creek territory in present-day Alabama. The army, led by General John Floyd, went to the heart of the Creek Holy Grounds and won a major offensive against one of the largest Creek towns at the Battle of Autossee, killing an estimated two hundred people. In November, the militia of Mississippi with a combined 1,200 troops attacked the Econachca encampment in the Battle of Holy Ground on the Alabama River. Tennessee raised a militia of 5,000 under Major General Andrew Jackson and Brigadier General John Coffee and won the battles of Tallushatchee and Talladega in November 1813.

Jackson suffered enlistment problems in the winter. He decided to combine his force, composed of Tennessee militia and pro-American Creek, with the Georgia militia. In January, however, the Red Sticks attacked his army at the Battles of Emuckfaw and Enotachopo Creek. Jackson's troops repelled the attackers, but they were outnumbered and forced to withdraw to his base at Fort Strother.

In January, Floyd's force of 1,300 state militia and 400 Creek moved to join the United States forces in Tennessee, but they were attacked in camp on the Calibee Creek by Tukabatchee Muscogees on 27 January.

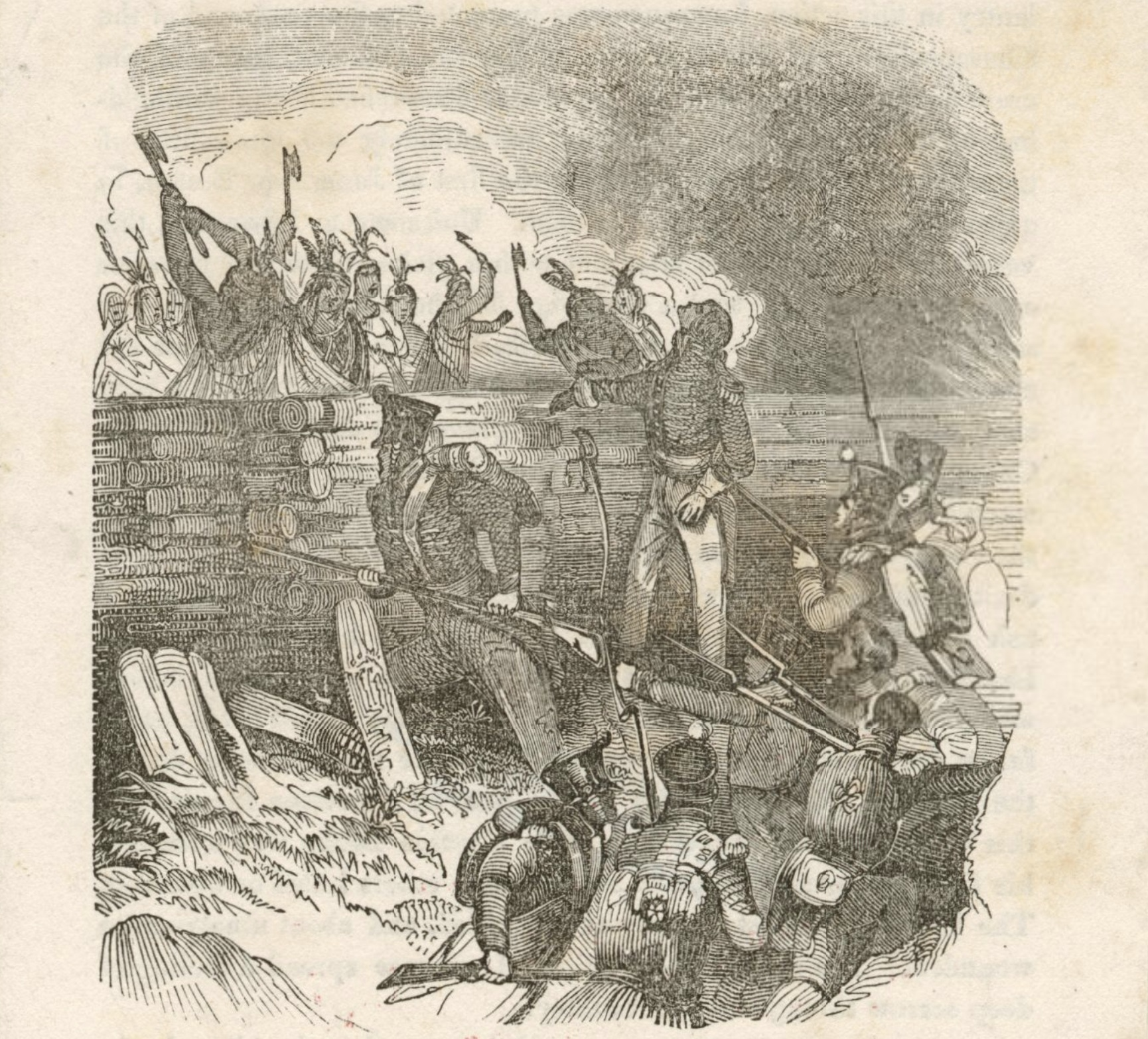
Creek forces were defeated at the Battle of Horseshoe Bend, bringing an end to the Creek War.

Jackson's force increased in numbers with the arrival of United States Army soldiers and a second draft of Tennessee state militia, Cherokee, and pro-American Creek swelled his army to around 5,000. In March 1814, they moved south to attack the Red Sticks. On 27 March, Jackson decisively defeated a force of about a thousand Red Sticks at Horseshoe Bend, killing 800 of them at a cost of 49 killed and 154 wounded.

Jackson then moved his army to Fort Jackson on the Alabama River. He promptly turned on the pro-American Creek who had fought with him and compelled their chieftains, along with a single Red Stick chieftain, to sign the Treaty of Fort Jackson, which forced the Creek tribe as a whole to cede most of western Georgia and part of Alabama to the US. Both Hawkins and the pro-American Creek strongly opposed the treaty, which they regarded as deeply unjust. The third clause of the treaty also demanded that the Creek cease communicating with the British and Spanish, and trade only with United States-approved agents.

==== Gulf of Mexico coast ====
British aid to the Red Sticks arrived after the end of the Napoleonic Wars in April 1814 and after Admiral Alexander Cochrane assumed command from Admiral Warren in March. Captain Hugh Pigot arrived in May 1814 with two ships to arm the Red Sticks. He thought that some 6,600 warriors could be armed and recruited. It was overly optimistic at best. The Red Sticks were in the process of being destroyed as a military force. Cochrane underestimated Jackson's competence, and was likely unaware of his progress over the Creek, even after his victory. In April 1814, the British established an outpost on the Apalachicola River (Prospect Bluff Historic Sites). Cochrane sent a company of Royal Marines commanded by Edward Nicolls, the vessels HMS Hermes and HMS Carron and further supplies to meet the Indians in the region. In addition to training them, Nicolls was tasked to raise a force from escaped slaves as part of the Corps of Colonial Marines.

On 12 July 1814, General Jackson complained to the governor of West Florida, Mateo González Manrique, situated at Pensacola that combatants from the Creek War were being harboured in Spanish territory and made reference to reports of the British presence on Spanish soil. Although he gave an angry reply to Jackson, Manrique was alarmed at the weak position he found himself in and appealed to the British for help. The British were observed docking on August 25 and unloading the following day.

The first engagement of the British and their Creek allies against the Americans on the Gulf of Mexico coast was the 14 September 1814 attack on Fort Bowyer. Captain William Percy tried to take the United States fort, hoping to then move on Mobile and block United States trade and encroachment on the Mississippi. After the Americans repulsed Percy's forces, the British established a military presence of up to 200 Marines at Pensacola. In November, Jackson's force of 4,000 men took the town. This underlined the superiority of numbers of Jackson's force in the region. The United States force moved to New Orleans in late 1814. Jackson's army of 1,000 regulars and 3,000 to 4,000 militia, pirates and other fighters as well as civilians and slaves built fortifications south of the city.

American forces under General James Wilkinson, himself a paid Spanish secret agent, took the Mobile area from the Spanish in March 1813. This region was the rump of Spanish West Florida, the western portion of which had been annexed to the United States in 1810. The Americans built Fort Bowyer, a log and earthen-work fort with 14 guns, on Mobile Point to defend it. Major Latour opined that none of the three forts in the area were capable of resisting a siege.

At the end of 1814, the British launched a double offensive in the South weeks before the Treaty of Ghent was signed. On the Atlantic coast, Admiral George Cockburn was to close the Intracoastal Waterway trade and land Royal Marine battalions to advance through Georgia to the western territories. While on the Gulf coast, Admiral Alexander Cochrane moved on the new state of Louisiana and the Mississippi Territory. Cochrane's ships reached the Louisiana coast on 9 December and Cockburn arrived in Georgia on 14 December.

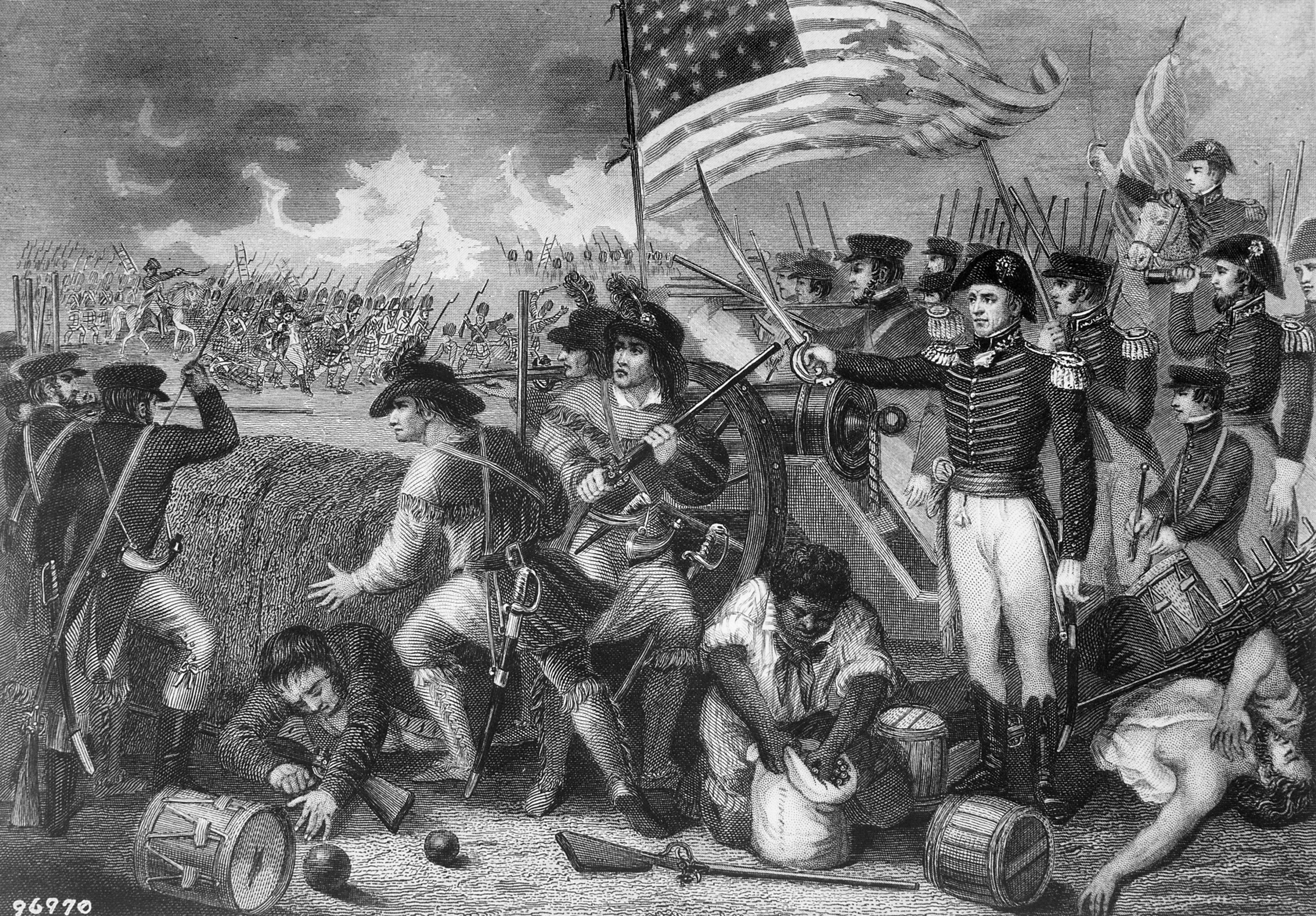
American forces repelled a British assault on New Orleans in January 1815. The battle occurred before news of a peace treaty reached the United States.

The British army had the objective of gaining control of the entrance of the Mississippi. To this end, an expeditionary force of 8,000 troops under Major General Edward Pakenham and Major general Samuel Gibbs attacked Jackson's prepared defences in New Orleans on 8 January 1815. The Battle of New Orleans was an American victory, as the British failed to take the fortifications on the East Bank. The British attack force suffered high casualties, including 291 dead, 1,262 wounded and 484 captured or missing whereas American casualties were light with 13 dead, 39 wounded and 19 missing, according to the respective official casualty returns. This battle was hailed as a great victory across the United States, making Jackson a national hero and eventually propelling him to the presidency. In January 1815 Fort St. Philip endured ten days of bombardment from two bomb vessels of the Royal Navy. Robert V. Remini believes this was preventing the British moving their fleet up the Mississippi in support of the land attack.

After deciding further attacks would be too costly and unlikely to succeed, the British troops withdrew on 18 January. However, adverse winds slowed the evacuation operation and it was not until 27 January 1815 that the land forces rejoined the fleet, allowing for its final departure.

After New Orleans, the British moved to take Mobile as a base for further operations. General John Lambert laid siege to Fort Bowyer and captured it on 12 February 1815, making it one of the final land engagements, and often identified as the last land battle, between British and American forces in the war. British commanders intended to use Fort Bowyer as a step towards Mobile, but HMS Brazen brought news of the Treaty of Ghent the next day, leading the British to abandon further Gulf Coast operations. This ending of the war prevented the capture of Mobile, and any renewed attacks on New Orleans.

Meanwhile, in January 1815, Cockburn succeeded in blockading the southeastern coast of Georgia by occupying Camden County. The British quickly took Cumberland Island, Fort Point Peter and Fort St. Tammany in a decisive victory. Under the orders of his commanding officers, Cockburn's forces relocated many refugee slaves, capturing St. Simons Island as well to do so. He had orders to recruit as many runaway slaves into the Corps of Colonial Marines as possible and use them to conduct raids in Georgia and the Carolinas. Cockburn also provided thousands of muskets and carbines and a huge quantity of ammunition to the Creeks and Seminole Indians for the same purpose. During the invasion of the Georgia coast, an estimated 1,485 people chose to relocate to British territories or join the British military. However, by mid-March, several days after being informed of the Treaty of Ghent, British ships left the area.

The British government did not recognize either West Florida or New Orleans as American territory. The historian Frank Owsley suggests that they might have used a victory at New Orleans to demand further concessions from the US. However, subsequent research in the correspondence of British ministers at the time suggests otherwise, with specific reference to correspondence from the Prime Minister to the Foreign Secretary dated 23 December 1814. West Florida was the only territory permanently gained by the United States during the war.

=== Naval warfare ===
==== Background ====
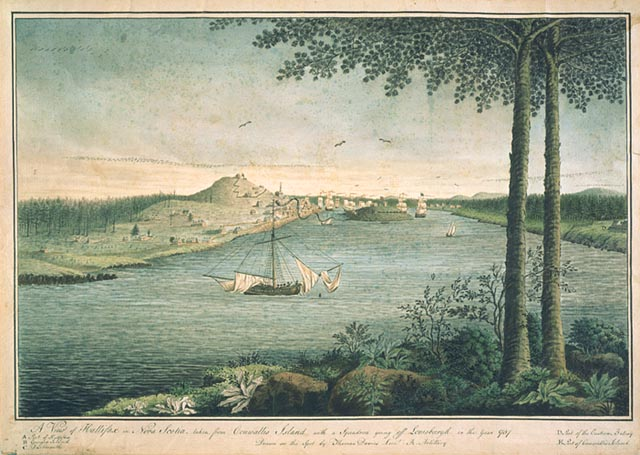
The Royal Navy's North American squadron was based in Halifax, Nova Scotia and Bermuda. At the start of the war, the squadron had one ship of the line, seven frigates, nine sloops as well as brigs and schooners.

In 1812, Britain's Royal Navy was the world's largest and most powerful navy, with over 600 vessels in commission, following the defeat of the French Navy at the Battle of Trafalgar in 1805. Most of these ships were employed blockading the French navy and protecting British trade against French privateers, but the Royal Navy still had 85 vessels in American waters, counting all North American and Caribbean waters. (Note: Admiralty reply to British press criticism.) However, the Royal Navy's North American squadron was the most immediately available force, based in Halifax and Bermuda (two of the colonies that made up British North America), and numbered one small ship of the line and seven frigates as well as nine smaller sloops and brigs and five schooners. By contrast, the entire United States Navy was composed of 8 frigates, 14 smaller sloops and brigs, with no ships of the line. The United States had embarked on a major shipbuilding program before the war at Sackett's Harbor to provide ships for use on the Great Lakes and continued to produce new ships.

==== Opening strategies ====
The British strategy was to protect their own merchant shipping between Halifax and the West Indies, with the order given on 13 October 1812 to enforce a blockade of major American ports to restrict American trade.

Because of their numerical inferiority, the American strategy was to cause disruption through hit-and-run tactics such as the capturing prizes and engaging Royal Navy vessels only under favourable circumstances.

Days after the formal declaration of war, the United States put out two small squadrons, including the frigate President and the sloop Hornet under Commodore John Rodgers and the frigates United States and Congress, with the brig Argus under Captain Stephen Decatur. These were initially concentrated as one unit under Rodgers, who intended to force the Royal Navy to concentrate its own ships to prevent isolated units being captured by his powerful force. Large numbers of American merchant ships were returning to the United States with the outbreak of war and the Royal Navy could not watch all the ports on the American seaboard if they were concentrated together. Rodgers' strategy worked in that the Royal Navy concentrated most of its frigates off New York Harbor under Captain Philip Broke, allowing many American ships to reach home. However, Rodgers' own cruise captured only five small merchant ships, and the Americans never subsequently concentrated more than two or three ships together as a unit.

==== Single-ship actions ====
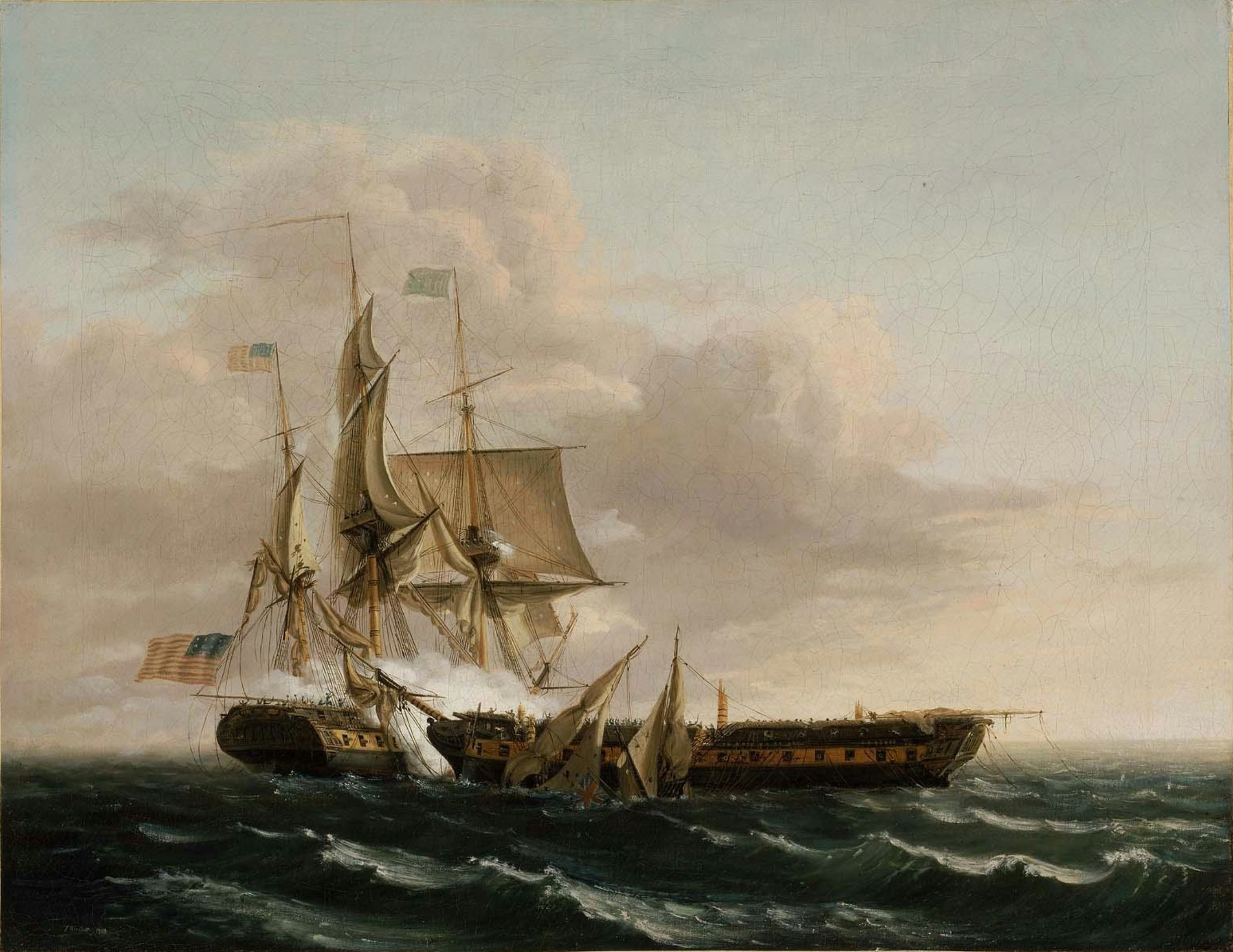
USS Constitution defeats HMS Guerriere in a single-ship engagement. The battle was an important victory for American morale.

The more recently built frigates of the US Navy were intended to overmatch their opponents. The United States did not believe that it could build a large enough navy to contest with the Royal Navy in fleet actions. Therefore, where it could be done, individual ships were built to be tougher, larger, and carry more firepower than their equivalents in European navies. (Note: "They are superior to any European frigate," Humphreys wrote of the design he had in mind, "and if others should be in [the enemy's] company, our frigates can always lead ahead and never be obliged to go into action, but on their own terms, except in a calm; in blowing weather our ships are capable of engaging to advantage double-deck ships." In another design Humphreys proposed "such frigates as in blowing weather would be an overmatch for double-deck ships, and in light winds evade coming into action.") The newest three 44-gun ships were designed with a 24-pounder main battery. These frigates were intended to demolish the 36- to 38-gun (18-pounder) armed frigates that formed the majority of the world's navies, while being able to evade larger ships. Similarly the Wasp class ship-sloops were an over-match to the Cruizer class brigs being employed by the British. The Royal Navy, maintaining more than 600 ships in fleets and stations worldwide, was overstretched and undermanned; most British ships enforcing the blockade were (with a few notable exceptions) less practiced than the crews of the smaller US Navy. (Note: With sufficient training and drilling gunnery could be improved, but there was no immediate solution for the lack of crew numbers on British ships. There were six hundred ships in service, manned by only 140,000 seamen and marines. Subsequently the Royal Navy was spread out thin which compromised a crew's overall efficiency and could not rival the quality and efficiency of the crews employed in the smaller, all-volunteer US Navy.) This meant that in single-ship actions the Royal Navy ships often found themselves against larger ships with larger crews, who were better drilled, as intended by the US planners. (Note: Admiral Warren was evidently concerned, because he circulated a standing order, on March 6, directing his commanders to give priority to "the good discipline and the proper training of their Ships Companies to the expert management of the Guns." All officers and seamen on the North American station were urged to keep in mind "that the issue of the Battle will greatly depend on the cool, steady and regular manner in which the Guns shall be loaded, pointed & fired." Two weeks later, the Admiralty issued a circular to all the British admirals, discouraging the daily "spit and polish" scouring of the brasswork and directing that "the time thrown away on this unnecessary practice be applied to the really useful and important points of discipline and exercise at Arms.")

However naval ships do not fight as individuals by the code of the duel, they are national instruments of war and are used as such. The Royal Navy counted on its numbers, experience, and traditions to overcome the individually superior vessels. As the US Navy found itself mostly blockaded by the end of the war, the Royal Navy was correct. For all the fame that these actions received, they in no way affected the outcome of the results of Atlantic theatre of War. The final count of frigates lost was three on each side, with most of the US Navy blockaded in port. (Note: Compared to other nations, the British navy had mastered the practice of employing blockades, which severely compromised an enemy's freedom of movement, supply lines, and economic vitality. It also protected their commercial shipping by preventing enemy privateers and cruisers from going out to sea and capturing prizes. Britain's ten-year-old commercial and military blockade of continental Europe had largely succeeded in its twin goals of interdicting most seagoing commerce while keeping the French navy imprisoned in its ports. It was therefore to be expected that the main thrust of British naval strategy during the war was the employment of blockades along the American coast.) During the war, the United States Navy captured 165 British merchantmen (although privateers captured many more) while the Royal Navy captured 1,400 American merchantmen. More significantly, the British blockade of the Atlantic coast caused the majority of warships to be unable to put to sea and shut down both American imports and exports. (Note: The tightening grip of the British blockade was beginning to take a severe economic toll on communities throughout the country. The drain on the treasury remained a pressing concern, and the Republican-dominated Congress finally recognized the need for more tax revenue; a new levy fell on licences, carriages, auctions, sugar refineries, and salt.)

Notable single-ship engagements include USS Constitution vs HMS Guerriere on 19 August 1812, USS United States vs HMS Macedonian on 25 October, USS Constitution vs HMS Java on 29–30 December, HMS Shannon vs USS Chesapeake on 1 June 1813 (the bloodiest such action of the war), HMS Phoebe vs USS Essex on 28 March 1814, HMS Endymion vs USS President on 15 January 1815.

In single ship battles, superior force was the most significant factor. In response to the majority of the American ships being of greater force than the British ships of the same class, Britain constructed five 40-gun, 24-pounder heavy frigates and two "spar-decked" frigates (the 60-gun HMS Leander and HMS Newcastle) and others. To counter the American sloops of war, the British constructed the Cyrus-class ship-sloop of 22 guns. The British Admiralty also instituted a new policy that the three American heavy frigates should not be engaged except by a ship of the line or frigates in squadron strength. (Note: The superior force and scantlings of the American 44-gun frigates, now denounced as "disguised ships of the line," prompted the Admiralty to issue a "Secret & Confidential" order to all station chiefs prohibiting single-frigate engagements with the Constitution, President, or United States. A lone British frigate was henceforth ordered to flee from the big American frigates, or (if it could be done safely) to shadow them at a prudent distance, remaining out of cannon-shot range, until reinforcements.)

The United States Navy's smaller ship-sloops had also won several victories over Royal Navy sloops-of-war, again of smaller armament. The American sloops Hornet, Wasp (1807), Peacock, Wasp (1813) and Frolic were all ship-rigged while the British Cruizer-class sloops that they encountered were brig-rigged, which gave the Americans a significant advantage. Ship rigged vessels are more manoeuvrable in battle because they have a wider variety of sails and thus being more resistant to damage. Ship-rigged vessels can back sail, literally backing up or heave to (stop). (Note: More significantly, if some spars are shot away on a brig because it is more difficult to wear and the brig loses the ability to steer while a ship could adjust its more diverse canvas to compensate for the imbalance caused by damage in battle. Furthermore, ship-rigged vessels with three masts simply have more masts to shoot away than brigs with two masts before the vessel is unmanageable.)

==== Privateering ====
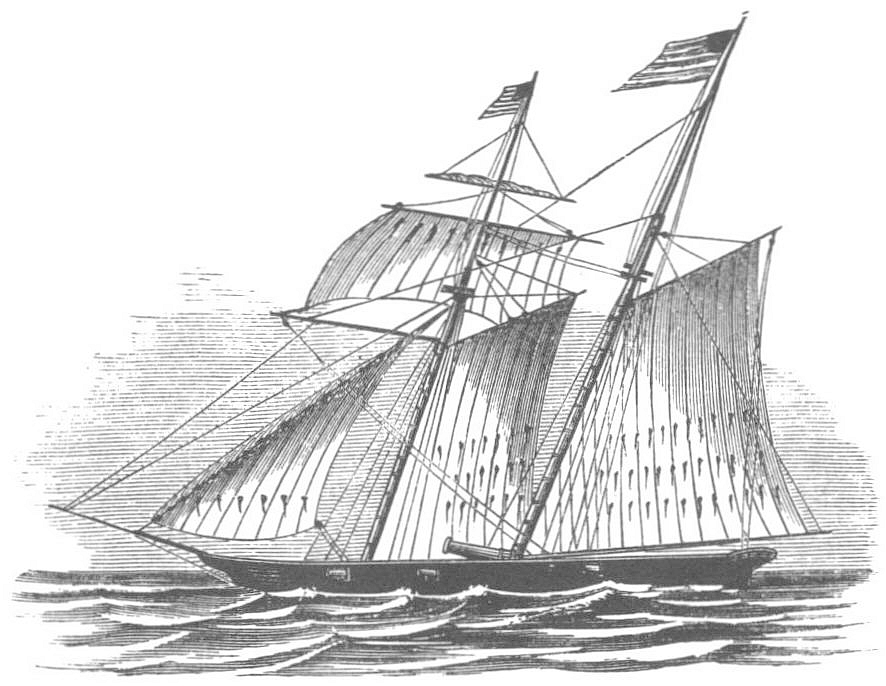
Baltimore Clippers were a series of schooners used by American privateers during the war.

The operations of American privateers proved a more significant threat to British trade than the United States Navy. They operated throughout the Atlantic until the close of the war, most notably from Baltimore. American privateers reported taking 1300 British merchant vessels, compared to 254 taken by the United States Navy, although the insurer Lloyd's of London reported that only 1,175 British ships were taken, 373 of which were recaptured, for a total loss of 802. Canadian historian Carl Benn wrote that American privateers took 1,344 British ships, of which 750 were retaken by the British. The British tried to limit privateering losses by the strict enforcement of convoy by the Royal Navy and directly by blockading coastal waterways and capturing 278 American privateers. Due to the massive size of the British merchant fleet, American captures only affected 7.5% of the fleet, resulting in no supply shortages or lack of reinforcements for British forces in North America. Of 526 American privateers, 148 were captured by the Royal Navy and only 207 ever took a prize.

Due to the large size of their navy, the British did not rely as much on privateering. The majority of the 1,407 captured American merchant ships were taken by the Royal Navy. The war was the last time the British allowed privateering, since the practice was coming to be seen as politically inexpedient and of diminishing value in maintaining its naval supremacy. However, privateering remained popular in British colonies. It was the last hurrah for privateers in the insular British North American colony of Bermuda who vigorously returned to the practice with experience gained in previous wars. The nimble Bermuda sloops captured 298 American ships. Privateer schooners based in continental British North America, especially from Nova Scotia, took 250 American ships and proved especially effective in crippling American coastal trade and capturing American ships closer to shore than the Royal Navy's cruisers.

==== British blockade ====
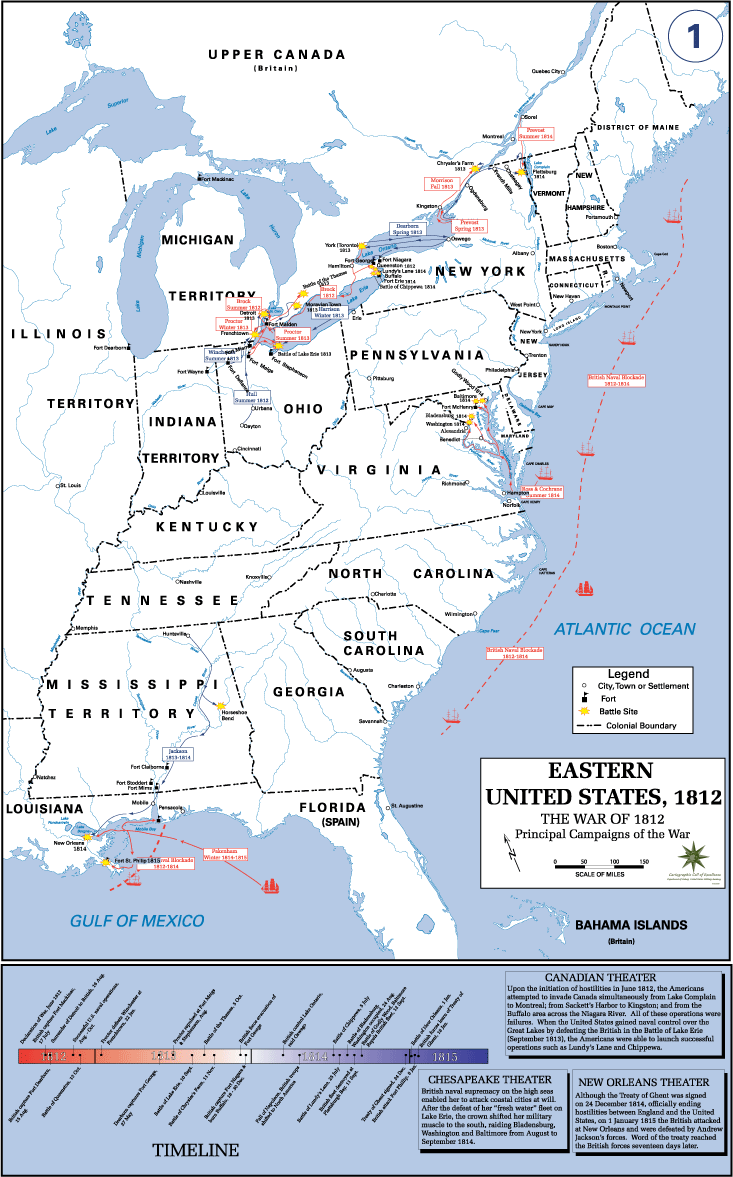
British naval strategy was to protect their shipping in North America and enforce a naval blockade on the United States.

The naval blockade of the United States began informally in the late fall of 1812. Under the command of British Admiral John Borlase Warren, it extended from South Carolina to Florida. It expanded to cut off more ports as the war progressed. Twenty ships were on station in 1812 and 135 were in place by the end of the conflict. In March 1813, the Royal Navy punished the Southern states, who were most vocal about annexing British North America, by blockading Charleston, Port Royal, Savannah, and New York City as well. Additional ships were sent to North America in 1813 and the Royal Navy tightened and extended the blockade, first to the coast south of Narragansett by November 1813 and to the entire American coast on 31 May 1814. In May 1814, following the abdication of Napoleon and the end of the supply problems with Wellington's army, New England was blockaded.

The British needed American foodstuffs for their army in Spain and benefited from trade with New England, so they did not at first blockade New England. The Delaware River and Chesapeake Bay were declared in a state of blockade on 26 December 1812. Illicit trade was carried on by collusive captures arranged between American traders and British officers. American ships were fraudulently transferred to neutral flags. Eventually, the United States government was driven to issue orders to stop illicit trading. This put only a further strain on the commerce of the country. The British fleet occupied the Chesapeake Bay and attacked and destroyed numerous docks and harbours. The effect was that no foreign goods could enter the United States on ships and only smaller fast boats could attempt to get out. The cost of shipping became very expensive as a result. (Note: "The British blockade had a crushing effect on American foreign trade. "Commerce is becoming very slack," reported a resident of Baltimore in the spring of 1813: "no arrivals from abroad, & nothing going to sea but sharp [that is fast] vessels." By the end of the year, the sea lanes had become so dangerous that merchants wishing to sell goods had to shell out 50 percent of the value of the ship and cargo.")

The blockade of American ports later tightened to the extent that most American merchant ships and naval vessels were confined to port. The American frigates USS United States and USS Macedonian ended the war blockaded and hulked in New London, Connecticut. USS United States and USS Macedonian attempted to set sail to raid British shipping in the Caribbean, but were forced to turn back when confronted with a British squadron, and by the end of the war, the United States had six frigates and four ships-of-the-line sitting in port. Some merchant ships were based in Europe or Asia and continued operations. Others, mainly from New England, were issued licences to trade by Admiral Warren, commander in chief on the American station in 1813. This allowed Wellington's army in Spain to receive American goods and to maintain the New Englanders' opposition to the war. The blockade nevertheless decreased American exports from $130 million in 1807 to $7 million in 1814. Most exports were goods that ironically went to supply their enemies in Britain or the British colonies. The blockade had a devastating effect on the American economy with the value of American exports and imports falling from $114 million in 1811 down to $20 million by 1814 while the United States Customs took in $13 million in 1811 and $6 million in 1814, even though the Congress had voted to double the rates. The British blockade further damaged the American economy by forcing merchants to abandon the cheap and fast coastal trade to the slow and more expensive inland roads. In 1814, only 1 out of 14 American merchantmen risked leaving port as it was likely that any ship leaving port would be seized.

As the Royal Navy base that supervised the blockade, Halifax profited greatly during the war. From there, British privateers seized and sold many French and American ships. More than a hundred prize vessels were anchored in St. George's Harbour awaiting condemnation by the Admiralty Court when a hurricane struck in 1815, sinking roughly sixty of the vessels.

=== Freeing and recruiting slaves ===
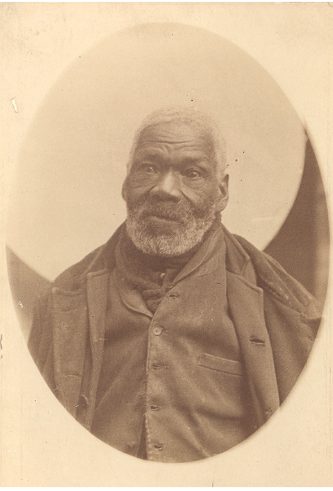
The only known photograph of a Black Refugee, c. 1890. During the war, a number of African Americans slaves escaped aboard British ships, settling in Canada (mainly in Nova Scotia) or Trinidad.

The British Royal Navy's blockades and raids allowed about 4,000 African Americans to escape slavery by fleeing American plantations aboard British ships. American slaves near to the British military rebelled against their masters and made their way to British encampments. The migrants who settled in Canada were known as the Black Refugees. The blockading British fleet in the Chesapeake Bay received increasing numbers of freed slaves during 1813. By British government order, they were considered free persons when they reached British hands.

Alexander Cochrane's proclamation of 2 April 1814 invited Americans who wished to emigrate to join the British. Although it did not explicitly mention slaves, it was taken by all as addressed to them. About 2,400 escaped slaves and their families were transported by the Royal Navy to the Royal Naval Dockyard at Bermuda (where they were employed on works about the yard and organized as a militia to aid in the defence of the yard), Nova Scotia and New Brunswick during and after the war. Starting in May 1814, younger male volunteers were recruited into a new Corps of Colonial Marines. They fought for Britain throughout the Atlantic campaign, including the Battle of Bladensburg, the attacks on Washington, D.C., and the Battle of Baltimore, before withdrawing to Bermuda with the rest of the British forces. They were later settled in Trinidad after having rejected orders for transfer to the West India Regiments, forming the community of the Merikins (none of the freed slaves remained in Bermuda after the war). These escaped slaves represented the largest emancipation of African Americans prior to the American Civil War. Britain paid the United States for the financial loss of the slaves at the end of the war.

== Treaty of Ghent ==
In August 1814, peace discussions began in Ghent (in present-day Belgium); both sides approached negotiations warily. (Note: For details of the negotiations, see Samuel Flagg Bemis (1956), John Quincy Adams and the Foundations of American Foreign Policy, pp. 196–220; Remini 1991, pp. 94–122; Ward & Gooch 1922, pp. 537–542 and Mahan 1905, pp. 73–78.) The British strategy for decades had been to create a buffer state in the American Northwest Territory to block American expansion. Britain also demanded naval control of the Great Lakes and access to the Mississippi River. On the American side, Monroe instructed the American diplomats sent to Europe to try to convince the British to cede the Canadas, or at least Upper Canada, to the US. At a later stage, the Americans also demanded damages for the burning of Washington and for the seizure of ships before the war began.

Depiction of the signing of the Treaty of Ghent, which formally ended the war between the British Empire and the United States

American public opinion was outraged when Madison published the demands as even the Federalists were now willing to fight on. A British force burned Washington, but it failed to capture Baltimore and sailed away when its commander was killed. In northern New York State, 10,000 British veterans were marching south until a decisive defeat at the Battle of Plattsburgh forced them back to Canada. (Note: The British were unsure whether the attack on Baltimore was a failure, but Plattsburg was a humiliation that called for court martial (Latimer 2007, pp. 331, 359, 365).) British Prime Minister Lord Liverpool, aware of growing opposition to wartime taxation and the demands of merchants for reopened trade with America, realized Britain also had little to gain and much to lose from prolonged warfare especially given growing concern about the situation in Europe. The main focus of British foreign policy was the Congress of Vienna, at which British diplomats had clashed with Russian and Prussian diplomats over the terms of the peace with France and there were fears that Britain might have to go to war with Russia and Prussia. Export trade was all but paralyzed and France was no longer an enemy of Britain after Napoleon fell in April 1814, so the Royal Navy no longer needed to stop American shipments to France and it no longer needed to impress more seamen. The British were preoccupied in rebuilding Europe after the apparent final defeat of Napoleon.

Consequently, Lord Liverpool urged the British negotiators to offer a peace based on the restoration of the pre-war status quo. The British negotiators duly dropped their demands for the creation of an Indian neutral zone, which allowed negotiations to resume at the end of October. The American negotiators accepted the British proposals for a peace based on the pre-war status quo. Prisoners were to be exchanged and escaped slaves returned to the United States, as at least 3,000 American slaves had escaped to British lines. The British however refused to honour this aspect of the treaty, settling some of the newly freed slaves in Nova Scotia and New Brunswick. The Americans protested Britain's failure to return American slaves in violation of the Treaty of Ghent. After arbitration by the Tsar of Russia the British paid $1,204,960 in damages to Washington, to reimburse the slave owners.

On 24 December 1814, the diplomats had finished and signed the Treaty of Ghent. The treaty was ratified by the British Prince Regent three days later on 27 December. On 17 February, it arrived in Washington, where it was quickly ratified and went into effect, ending the war. The terms called for all occupied territory to be returned, the prewar boundary between Canada and the United States to be restored, and the Americans were to gain fishing rights in the Gulf of Saint Lawrence. The British insisted on the inclusion of provisions to restore to the Indians "all possessions, rights and privileges which they may have enjoyed, or been entitled to in 1811". The Americans ignored and violated these provisions.

The treaty did not contain any British renunciation of impressment or of wider maritime belligerent rights. This reflected the changed strategic context by late 1814: Napoleon's defeat had removed the immediate need to stop American shipments to France or impress additional seamen, even though the legal dispute itself had not been resolved.

The Treaty of Ghent completely maintained Britain's maritime belligerent rights, a key goal for the British, without acknowledging American maritime rights or the end of impressment. Although impressment largely ceased after the Napoleonic Wars, Anglo-American disputes over maritime rights did not disappear entirely after 1815. In the 1820s, American diplomatic correspondence recorded rare allegations that seamen had been taken from American vessels into British service, including the brig Pharos at Sierra Leone in 1825 and later cases involving the Monroe, Juno, and Telegraph. Later disputes more commonly involved the stopping, visiting, searching, or seizure of American vessels, especially during British anti-slave-trade enforcement off West Africa and Cuba. These incidents did not amount to a revival of the pre-1815 impressment system, but they showed that the Treaty of Ghent had left the underlying maritime-rights dispute unresolved.

== Losses and compensation ==
Casualties in the War of 1812
| Type of casualties | United States | United Kingdom and Canada | Indigenous fighters | Spanish (Note: The casualties for the Spanish are from the Battle of Pensacola (1814), the Casualties for the Spanish during the Patriot War (Florida) are unknown, while there were no casualties at the Capture of Mobile as the entire garrison of 80 surrendered.) |
|---|---|---|---|---|
| Killed in action and died of wounds | 2,260 | ~2,700 | ~1,500 | 14 |
| Died of disease or accident | ~13,000 | ~8,000 | ~8,500 | 6 |
| Wounded in action | 4,505 | ~3,500 | Unknown | Unknown |
| Missing in action | 695 | ~1,000 | Unknown | Unknown |

Total losses from among various Indigenous nations, including those wounded and missing, are not known though the number of killed or died from disease has been estimated as at least 10,000 spread among all Indigenous nations engaged in the conflict. British losses in the war were about 1,160 killed in action and 3,679 wounded, with 3,321 British who died from disease. American losses were 2,260 killed in action and 4,505 wounded. While the number of Americans who died from disease is not known, it is estimated that about 15,000 died from all causes directly related to the war. Known Canadian dead, including Canadians who served in Fencible units of the British Army and with Canadian militia units in Upper and Lower Canada, are greater than 1,600.

The war added some £25 million to Britain's national debt. In the United States, the cost was $90 million reaching a peak of 2.7% of GDP. The national debt rose from $45 million in 1812 to $127 million by the end of 1815, although by selling bonds and treasury notes at deep discounts – and often for irredeemable paper money due to the suspension of specie payment in 1814 – the government received only $34 million worth of specie. Stephen Girard, the richest man in the United States at the time, was among those who funded the United States government's involvement in the war. The British national debt rose from £451 million in 1812 to £841 million in 1814, although this was at a time when Britain was fighting a war against Napoleon. The war was bad for both economies.

In the United States, the economy grew 3.7% a year from 1812 to 1815, despite a large loss of business by East Coast shipping interests. Prices were 15% higher – inflated – in 1815 compared to 1812, an annual rate of 4.8%. Hundreds of new banks were opened; they largely handled the loans that financed the war since tax revenues were down. Money that would have been spent on foreign trade was diverted to opening new factories, which were profitable since British factory-made products were not for sale. This gave a major boost to the Industrial Revolution in the United States as typified by the Boston Associates.

== Long-term consequences ==
The border between the United States and Canada remained essentially unchanged by the war, with neither side making meaningful territorial gains. (Note: Spain, a British ally, lost control of the Mobile, Alabama area to the Americans as a consequence of the Patriot War (Florida) which took place concurrently with the War of 1812.) Despite the Treaty of Ghent not addressing the original points of contention and establishing the status quo ante bellum, relations between the United States and Britain changed drastically. The issue of impressment also became irrelevant as the Royal Navy no longer needed sailors after the war.

The long-term results of the war were generally satisfactory for both the United States and Great Britain. Except for occasional border disputes and some tensions during and after the American Civil War, relations between the United States and Britain remained peaceful for the rest of the 19th century. In the 20th century, spurred by multiple world conflicts, the two countries became close allies. The memory of the conflict played a major role in helping to consolidate a Canadian national identity after 1867, the year of Canadian confederation.

The Rush–Bagot Treaty between the United States and Britain was enacted in 1817. It demilitarized the Great Lakes and Lake Champlain, where many British naval arrangements and forts still remained. The treaty laid the basis for a demilitarized boundary. It remains in effect to this day.

=== Bermuda ===
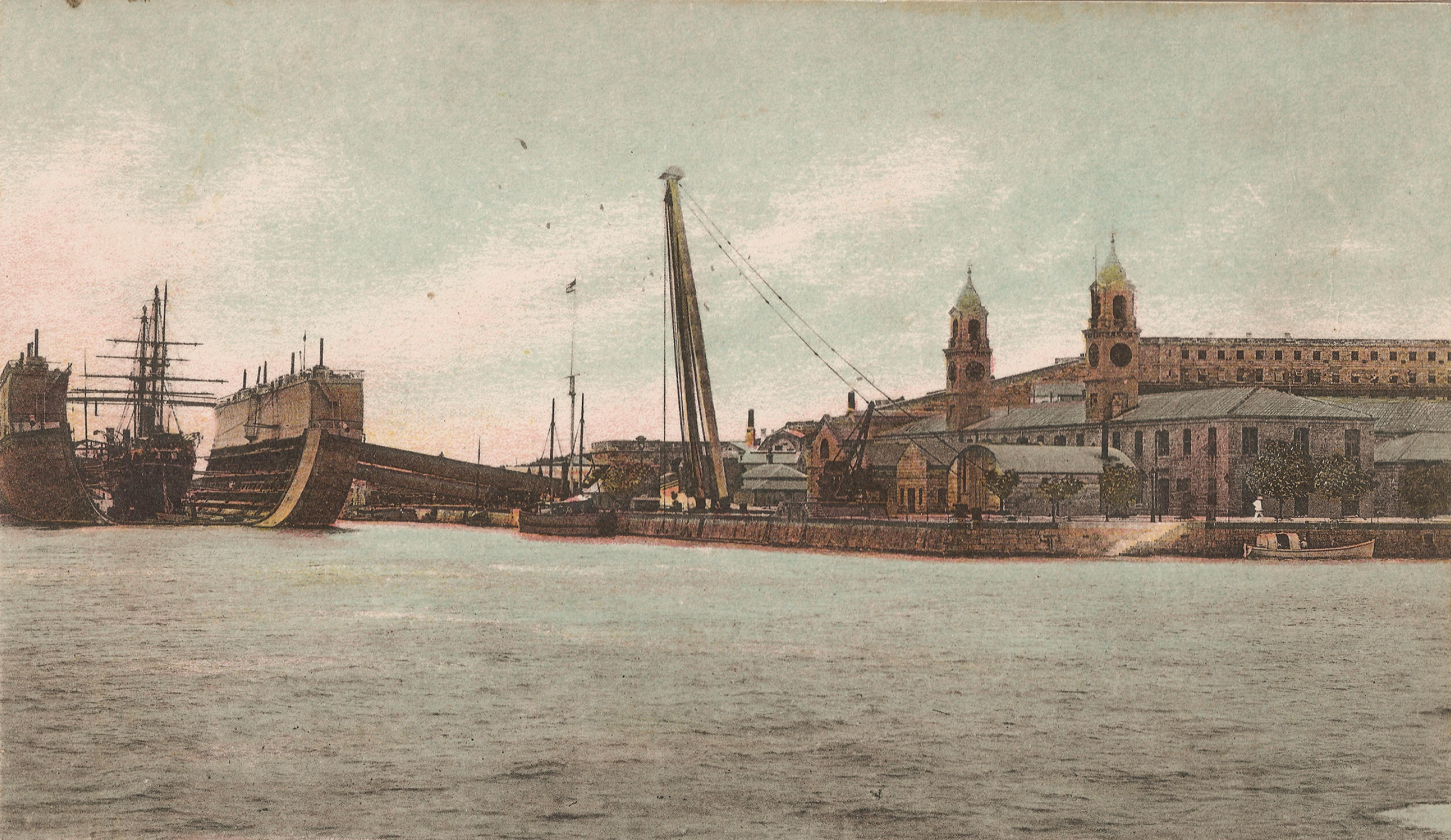
The Royal Naval Dockyard, Bermuda

Bermuda had been largely left to the defences of its own militia and privateers before American independence, but the Royal Navy had begun buying up land and operating from there beginning in 1795, after a number of years spent surveying the reefs to find Hurd's channel (which enabled large frigates and ships of the line to pass through the surrounding reefs to Murray's Anchorage and the enclosed harbours). As construction work progressed through the first half of the 19th century, Bermuda became an Imperial fortress and the permanent naval headquarters for the Western hemisphere, housing the Admiralty and serving as a base and dockyard. Defence infrastructure remained the central leg of Bermuda's economy until after World War II.

=== The Canadas ===
After the war, pro-British leaders in Upper Canada demonstrated a strong hostility to American influences, including republicanism, which shaped its policies. Immigration from the United States was discouraged and favour was shown to the Anglican Church as opposed to the more Americanized Methodist Church.

The Battle of York showed the vulnerability of Upper and Lower Canada (The Canadas). In the decades following the war, several projects were undertaken to improve the defence of the colonies against the United States. They included work on La Citadelle at Quebec City, Fort Henry at Kingston, and rebuilding Fort York at York. Additionally, work began on the Halifax Citadel to defend the port against foreign navies. Akin to the American view that it was a "Second War of Independence" for the United States, the war was also somewhat of a war of independence for Canada. Before the war Canada was a mix of French Canadians, native-born British subjects, loyalists and Americans who migrated there. Historian Donald R. Hickey maintains that the war that threatened Canada greatly helped to cement these disparate groups into a unified nation.

=== Indigenous nations ===
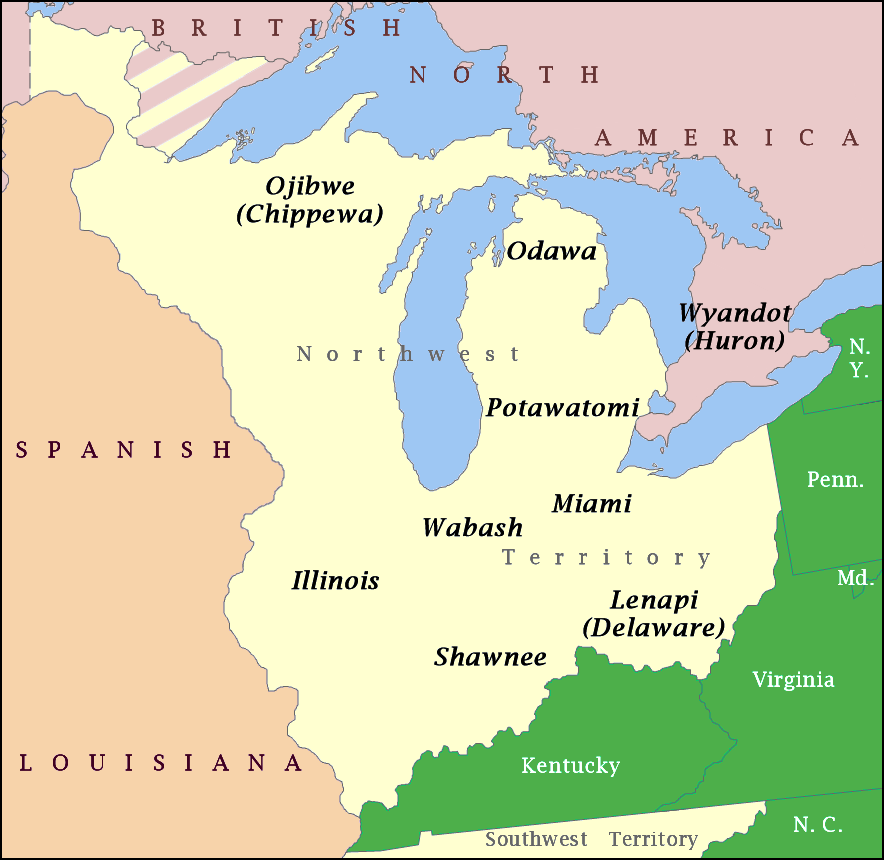
Map showing the general distribution of Indian tribes in the Northwest Territory in the early 1790s

The Indigenous tribes allied to the British lost their cause. The Americans rejected the British proposal to create an "Indian barrier state" in the American West at the Ghent peace conference and it never resurfaced. Donald Fixico argues that "[a]fter the War of 1812, the US negotiated over two hundred Indian treaties that involved the ceding of Indian lands and 99 of these agreements resulted in the creation of reservations west of the Mississippi River".

The Indigenous nations lost most of their fur-trapping territory. Indigenous nations were displaced in Alabama, Georgia, New York and Oklahoma, losing most of what is now Indiana, Michigan, Ohio and Wisconsin within the Northwest Territory as well as in New York and the South. They came to be seen as an undesirable burden by British policymakers, who now looked to the United States for markets and raw materials. Everyone, including British fur traders were prohibited from entering in the United States for purposes of trade.

British Indian agents however continued to meet regularly with their former allies among the tribes of the Old Northwest, but refused to supply them with arms or help them resist American attempts to displace them. The American government rapidly built a network of forts throughout the Old Northwest, thus establishing firm military control. It also sponsored American fur traders, who outcompeted the British fur traders. Meanwhile, Euro-American settlers rapidly migrated into the Old Northwest, into the lands occupied by the tribes who were previously allied with the British. The War of 1812 marked a turning point in the history of the Old Northwest because it established United States authority over the British and Indians of that border region.

After the decisive defeat of the Creek Indians at the Battle of Horseshoe Bend in 1814, some Creek warriors escaped to join the Seminole in Florida. The remaining Creek chiefs signed away about half their lands, comprising 23,000,000 acres (9,300,000 ha), covering much of southern Georgia and two-thirds of modern Alabama. The Creek were separated from any future help from the Spanish in Florida and from the Choctaw and Chickasaw to the west.

=== United Kingdom ===
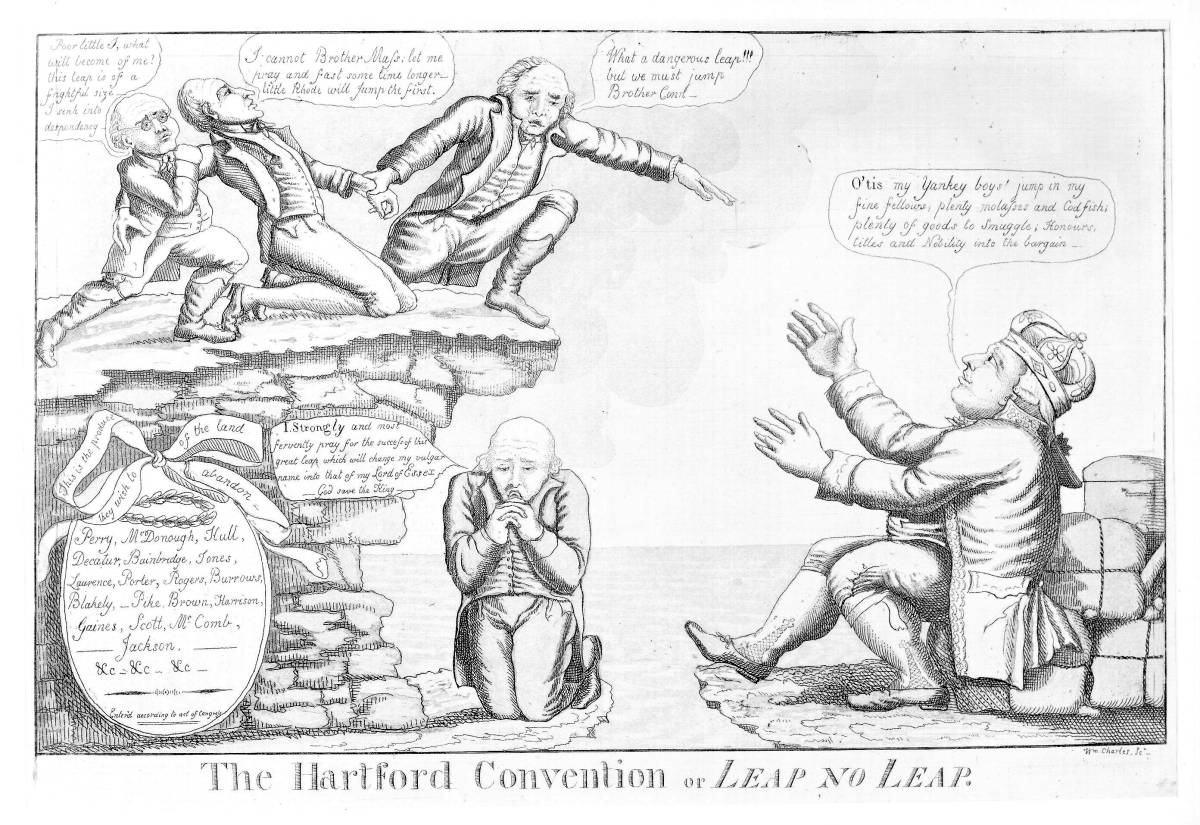
A political caricature of delegates from the Hartford Convention deciding whether to leap into the hands of the British, December 1814. The convention led to widespread fears that the New England states might attempt to secede from the United States.

The war is seldom remembered in the United Kingdom. The war in Europe against the French Empire under Napoleon ensured that the British did not consider the War of 1812 against the United States as more than a sideshow. Britain's blockade of French trade had worked, and the Royal Navy was the world's dominant nautical power (and remained so for over another century). While the land campaigns had contributed to saving Canada, the Royal Navy had shut down American commerce, bottled up the United States Navy in port and widely suppressed privateering. British businesses, some affected by rising insurance costs, were demanding peace so that trade could resume with the United States. The peace was generally welcomed by the British, although there was disquiet about the rapid growth of the United States. The two nations quickly resumed trade after the end of the war and a growing friendship.

The historian Donald Hickey maintains that for Britain, "the best way to defend Canada was to accommodate the United States. This was the principal rationale for Britain's long-term policy of rapprochement with the United States in the nineteenth century and explains why they were so often willing to sacrifice other imperial interests to keep the republic happy".

=== United States ===
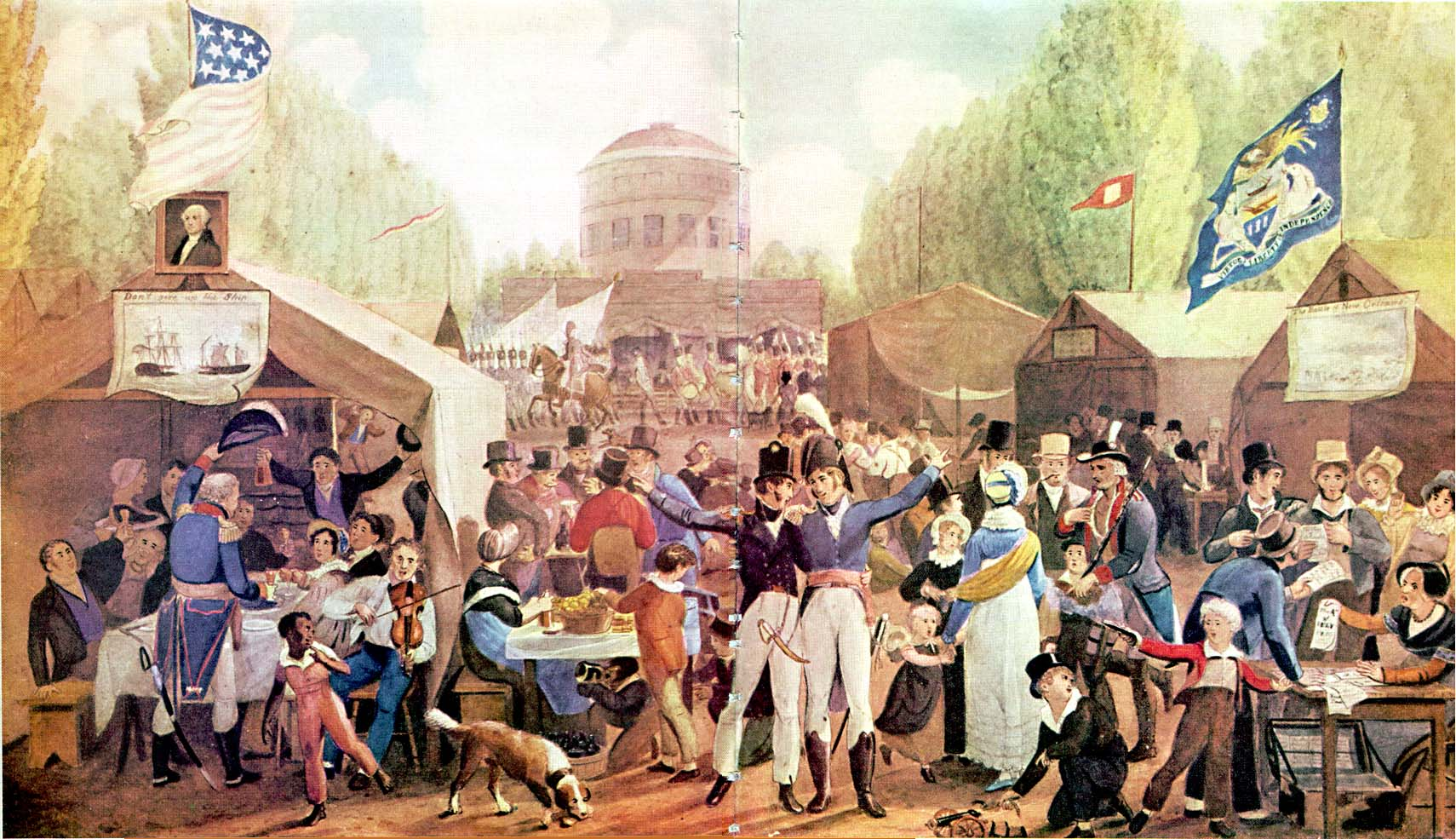
Independence Day celebrations in 1819. In the United States, the war was followed by the Era of Good Feelings, a period that saw nationalism and a desire for national unity rise throughout the country.

The nation gained a strong sense of complete independence as people celebrated their "second war of independence". Nationalism soared after the victory at the Battle of New Orleans. The opposition Federalist Party collapsed due to its opposition to the war and the Era of Good Feelings ensued.

No longer questioning the need for a strong Navy, the United States built three new 74-gun ships of the line and two new 44-gun frigates shortly after the end of the war. In 1816, the United States Congress passed into law an "Act for the gradual increase of the Navy" at a cost of $1,000,000 a year for eight years, authorizing nine ships of the line and 12 heavy frigates. The captains and commodores of the Navy became the heroes of their generation in the United States. Several war heroes used their fame to win elections to national office. Andrew Jackson and William Henry Harrison both benefited from their military successes to win the presidency, while representative Richard Mentor Johnson's role during the war helped him attain the vice presidency.

During the war, New England states became increasingly frustrated over how the war was being conducted and how the conflict affected them. They complained that the United States government was not investing enough militarily and financially in the states' defences and that the states should have more control over their militias. Increased taxes, the British blockade, and the occupation of some of New England by enemy forces also agitated public opinion in the states. At the Hartford Convention held between December 1814 and January 1815, Federalist delegates deprecated the war effort and sought more autonomy for the New England states. They did not call for secession, but word of the angry anti-war resolutions appeared as peace was announced and the victory at New Orleans was known. The upshot was that the Federalists were permanently discredited and quickly disappeared as a major political force.

This war enabled thousands of slaves to escape to freedom, despite the difficulties. The British helped numerous escaped slaves resettle in New Brunswick and Nova Scotia, where Black Loyalists had also been granted land after the American Revolutionary War.

Jackson invaded Florida (then part of New Spain) in 1818, demonstrating to Spain that it could no longer control that colonial territory with a small force. Spain sold Florida to the United States in 1819 under the Adams–Onís Treaty following the First Seminole War. Pratt concludes that "[t]hus indirectly the War of 1812 brought about the acquisition of Florida".

== Historiography ==
The historiography of the War of 1812 reflects the numerous interpretations of the conflict, especially in reference to the war's outcome. The historical record has interpreted both the British and Americans as victors in the conflict, with substantial academic and popular literature published to support each claim. Militarily historians hold the view that the war ended in a draw or stalemate.

The British viewed the War of 1812 as a minor theatre that was overshadowed by key victories at the Battle of Trafalgar in 1805 and the Battle of Waterloo in 1815, leading to the Pax Britannica. In the United States and Upper Canada, nationalistic mythology around the war took hold following its conclusion. (Note: Theodore Roosevelt commented: "Latour is the only trustworthy American contemporary historian of this war, and even he at times absurdly exaggerates the British force and loss, Most of the other American 'histories' of that period were the most preposterously bombastic works that ever saw print. But as regards this battle, none of them are as bad as even such British historians as Alison. ... The devices each author adopts to lessen the seeming force of his side are generally of much the same character. For instance, [at New Orleans] Latour says that 800 of Jackson's men were employed on works at the rear, on guard duty, etc., and deducts them; James, for precisely similar reasons, deducts 553 men. ... Almost all British writers underestimate their own force and enormously magnify that of the Americans.")

With the failure of the invasion of British Canada advancing the concept of Canadian identity, Canada remained a distinct region that would continue to evolve into a nation. Americans were able to enforce their sovereignty, and both the restoration of honor and what has been called the Second War of Independence are important themes in American historiography, and are considered significant results by historians. Indigenous nations are generally held to have lost in the war.

== See also ==
- Bibliography of early United States naval history
- Bibliography of the War of 1812
- Patriot War (Florida) – 1812 attempt to annex Florida to the US
- Timeline of the War of 1812
- War of 1812 campaigns

== Bibliography ==
- "$100 in 1812 → 1815 – Inflation Calculator". Officialdata.org.
- Adams, Donald R. (1978). "A Study of Stephen Girard's Bank, 1812–1831". Finance and enterprise in early America: a study of Stephen Girard's bank, 1812–1831. University of Pennsylvania Press. ISBN 978-0-8122-7736-4. JSTOR j.ctv4t814d.
- Adams, Henry (1918) [1891]. History of the United States of America during the First Administration of James Madison. Vol. II: History of the United States During the First Administration of James Madison. New York: Scribner & Sons.
- "African Nova Scotians in the Age of Slavery and Abolition". Government of Nova Scotia Programs, services and information. 4 December 2003.
- Akenson, Donald Harman (1999). The Irish in Ontario: A Study in Rural History. McGill-Queens. ISBN 978-0-7735-2029-5.
- Allen, Robert S. (1996). "Chapter 5: Renewing the Chain of Friendship". His Majesty's Indian allies: British Indian Policy in the Defence of Canada, 1774–1815. Toronto: Dundurn Press. ISBN 1-55002-175-3.
- "American Merchant Marine and Privateers in War of 1812". Usmm.org. Archived from the original on 11 April 2012.
- Anderson, Chandler Parsons (1906). Northern Boundary of the United States: The Demarcation of the Boundary Between the United States and Canada, from the Atlantic to the Pacific ... United States Government Printing Office.
- Aprill, Alex (October 2015). "General William Hull". Michigan Tech.
- Army and Navy Journal Incorporated (1865). The United States Army and Navy Journal and Gazette of the Regular and Volunteer Forces. Vol. 3. Princeton University.
- Arnold, James R.; Frederiksen, John C.; Pierpaoli, Paul G. Jr.; Tucker, Spencer C.; Wiener, Roberta (2012). The Encyclopedia of the War of 1812: A Political, Social, and Military History. Santa Barbara, California: ABC-CLIO. ISBN 978-1-85109-956-6.
- Arthur, Brian (2011). How Britain Won the War of 1812: The Royal Navy's Blockades of the United States. Boydell Press. ISBN 978-1-84383-665-0.
- Auchinleck, Gilbert (1855). A History of the War Between Great Britain and the United States of America: During the Years 1812, 1813, and 1814. Maclear & Company. p. 49.
- Barnes, Celia (2003). Native American power in the United States, 1783-1795. Fairleigh Dickinson University Press. ISBN 978-0838639580.
- Barney, Jason (2019). Northern Vermont in the War of 1812. Charleston, South Carolina. ISBN 978-1-4671-4169-7. OCLC 1090854645.
- "Battle of Mackinac Island, 17 July 1812". HistoryofWar.org.
- Benn, Carl (2002). The War of 1812. Oxford: Osprey Publishing. ISBN 978-1-84176-466-5.
- Benn, Carl; Marston, Daniel (2006). Liberty or Death: Wars That Forged a Nation. Oxford: Osprey Publishing. ISBN 1-84603-022-6.
- Bergquist, H. E. Jr. (1973). "The Boston Manufacturing Company and Anglo-American relations 1807–1820". Business History. 15 (1): 45–55. doi:10.1080/00076797300000003. ISSN 0007-6791.
- Bermingham, Andrew P. (2003). Bermuda Military Rarities. Bermuda Historical Society; Bermuda National Trust. ISBN 978-0-9697893-2-1.
- "Bermuda Dockyard and the War of 1812 Conference". Naval Historical Foundation. 7–12 June 2012. Archived from the original on 4 July 2020.
- Berthier-Foglar, Susanne; Otto, Paul (2020). Permeable Borders: History, Theory, Policy, and Practice in the United States. Berghahn Books. ISBN 978-1-78920-443-8.
- Berton, Pierre (2001) [1981]. Flames Across the Border: 1813–1814. Doubleday Canada, Limited. ISBN 0-385-65838-9.
- Bickham, Troy (2012). The Weight of Vengeance: The United States, the British Empire, and the War of 1812. Oxford University Press. ISBN 978-0-19-994262-6.
- "Black Sailors and Soldiers in the War of 1812". War of 1812. PBS. 2012. Archived from the original on 24 June 2020.
- Black, Jeremy (2002). America as a Military Power: From the American Revolution to the Civil War. Westport, Connecticut: Praeger. ISBN 9780275972981.
- Black, Jeremy (August 2008). "A British View of the Naval War of 1812". Naval History Magazine. Vol. 22, no. 4. U.S. Naval Institute.
- "Black Loyalists in New Brunswick, 1789–1853". Atlanticportal.hil.unb.ca. Atlantic Canada Portal, University of New Brunswick.
- Bowler, R Arthur (March 1988). "Propaganda in Upper Canada in the War of 1812". American Review of Canadian Studies. 18 (1): 11–32. doi:10.1080/02722018809480915.
- Bowman, John Stewart; Greenblatt, Miriam (2003). War of 1812. Infobase Publishing. ISBN 978-1-4381-0016-6.
- Brands, H. W. (2005). Andrew Jackson: His Life and Times. Random House Digital. ISBN 978-1-4000-3072-9.
- Braund, Kathryn E. Holland (1993). Deerskins & Duffels: The Creek Indian Trade with Anglo-America, 1685–1815. University of Nebraska Press. ISBN 978-0-8032-1226-8.
- Braund, Kathryn E. Holland (2012). Tohopeka: Rethinking the Creek War and the War of 1812. University of Alabama Press. ISBN 978-0-8173-5711-5.
- Brewer, D. L. III (May 2004). "Merchant Mariners – America's unsung heroes". Sealift. Military Sealift Command. Archived from the original on 12 August 2004.
- Brown, Roger H. (1971). The Republic in Peril (illustrated ed.). Norton. ISBN 978-0-393-00578-3.
- Buckner, Phillip Alfred (2008). Canada and the British Empire. Oxford University Press. pp. 47–48. ISBN 978-0-19-927164-1.
- Bullard, Mary Ricketson (1983). Black Liberation on Cumberland Island in 1815. M. R. Bullard.
- Bunn, Mike; Williams, Clay (2008). Battle for the Southern Frontier: The Creek War and the War of 1812. Arcadia Publishing Inc. ISBN 978-1-62584-381-4.
- Burroughs, Peter (1983). Prevost, Sir George. Vol. V. University of Toronto.
- Caffrey, Kate (1977). The Twilight's Last Gleaming: Britain vs. America 1812–1815. New York: Stein and Day. ISBN 0-8128-1920-9.
- Calloway, Colin G. (1986). "The End of an Era: British-Indian Relations in the Great Lakes Region after the War of 1812". Michigan Historical Review. 12 (2): 1–20. doi:10.2307/20173078. JSTOR 20173078.
- Carlisle, Rodney P.; Golson, J. Geoffrey (1 February 2007). Manifest Destiny and the Expansion of America. ABC-CLIO. ISBN 978-1-85109-833-0.
- Carr, James A. (July 1979). "The Battle of New Orleans and the Treaty of Ghent". Diplomatic History. 3 (3): 273–282. doi:10.1111/j.1467-7709.1979.tb00315.x.
- Carroll, Francis M. (March 1997). "The Passionate Canadians: The Historical Debate about the Eastern Canadian-American Boundary". The New England Quarterly. 70 (1): 83–101. doi:10.2307/366528. JSTOR 366528.
- Carstens, Patrick Richard; Sanford, Timothy L. (2011). Searching for the Forgotten War – 1812 Canada. Toronto: University of Toronto Press. ISBN 978-1-4535-8892-5.
- Chartrand, René (2012). Forts of the War of 1812. Bloomsbury Publishing. ISBN 978-1-78096-038-8.
- Clarke, James Stanier (1812). The Naval Chronicle, Volume 28. J. Gold.
- Clark, Connie D.; Hickey, Donald R., eds. (2015). The Routledge Handbook of the War of 1812. Routledge. ISBN 978-1-317-70198-9.
- Clarke Historical Library. "The War of 1812". Central Michigan University. Archived from the original on 4 August 2020.
- Clodfelter, M. (2017). Warfare and Armed Conflicts: A Statistical Encyclopedia of Casualty and Other Figures, 1492–2015 (4th ed.). Jefferson, North Carolina: McFarland. ISBN 9780786474707.
- Clymer, Adam (13 January 1991). "Confrontation in the Gulf; Congress acts to authorize war in Gulf; Margins are 5 votes in Senate, 67 in House". The New York Times.
- Cogliano, Francis D. (2008). Revolutionary America, 1763–1815: A Political History (2nd ed.). Routledge. ISBN 978-0-415-96486-9.
- Cole, Cyrenus (1921). A History of the People of Iowa. Cedar Rapids, Iowa: The Torch press. ISBN 978-1-378-51025-4.
- Coleman, William (Winter 2015). "'The Music of a well tun'd State': 'The Star-Spangled Banner' and the Development of a Federalist Musical Tradition". Journal of the Early Republic. 35 (4): 599–629. doi:10.1353/jer.2015.0063. S2CID 146831812.
- Coles, Harry L. (2018). The War of 1812. University of Chicago Press. ISBN 978-0-226-22029-1.
- "Come and discover more about the fortress once known as the Gibraltar of the West". Royal Naval Dockyard, Bermuda. Archived from the original on 25 August 2020.
- Connolly, Amanda (5 July 2018). "What's Driving the Dispute over U.S. Border Patrols and Canadian fishermen around Machias Seal Island?". Global News.
- Crawford, Michael J.; Dudley, William S., eds. (1985). The Naval War of 1812: A Documentary History. Vol. 1. Washington, DC: Naval Historical Center, Department of the Navy. ISBN 978-1-78039-364-3.
- Dangerfield, George (1952). The Era of Good Feelings. Harcourt, Brace. ISBN 978-0-929587-14-1.
- Dauber, Michele L. (2003). "The War of 1812, September 11th, and the Politics of Compensation". DePaul Law Review. 53 (2): 289–354.
- Daughan, George C. (2011). 1812: The Navy's War. New York: Basic Books. ISBN 978-0-465-02046-1.
- Dean, William G.; Heidenreich, Conrad; McIlwraith, Thomas F.; Warkentin, John, eds. (1998). "Plate 38". Concise Historical Atlas of Canada. Illustrated by Geoffrey J. Matthews and Byron Moldofsky. University of Toronto Press. p. 85. ISBN 978-0-802-04203-3.
- DeCosta-Klipa, Nik (22 July 2018). "The Long, Strange History of the Machias Seal Island Dispute". Boston.com.
- Deeben, John P. (Summer 2012). "The War of 1812 Stoking the Fires: The Impressment of Seaman Charles Davis by the U.S. Navy". Prologue Magazine. Vol. 44, no. 2. U.S. National Archives and Records Administration.
- Dowd, Gregory (2002). War Under Heaven: Pontiac, the Indian Nations, and the British Empire (2004 ed.). Johns Hopkins University Press. ISBN 978-0801878923.
- Dowd, Gregory (1991). A Spirited Resistance: The North American Indian Struggle for Unity, 1745–1815. Johns Hopkins University Press. ISBN 978-0801842368.
- Edmunds, David R (1997). Tecumseh and the Quest for Indian Leadership. Pearson Longman. ISBN 978-0673393364.
- Egan, Clifford L. (April 1974). "The Origins of the War of 1812: Three Decades of Historical Writing". Military Affairs. 38 (2): 72–75. doi:10.2307/1987240. JSTOR 1987240.
- Elting, John R. (1995). Amateurs to Arms. New York: Da Capo Press. ISBN 0-306-80653-3.
- Eustace, Nicole (2012). 1812: War and the Passions of Patriotism. Philadelphia: University of Pennsylvania Press. ISBN 978-0-81-220636-4.
- Faye, Kert (1997). Prize and Prejudice Privateering and Naval Prize in Atlantic Canada in the War of 1812. St. John's, Nfld: International Maritime Economic History Association.
- "First United States Infantry". Iaw.on.ca. Archived from the original on 28 July 2012.
- Fixico, Donald. "A Native Nations Perspective on the War of 1812". The War of 1812. PBS.
- Franklin, Robert E. "Prince de Neufchatel". Archived from the original on 6 December 2004.
- Frazer, Edward; Carr Laughton, L. G. (1930). The Royal Marine Artillery 1803–1923. Vol. 1. London: Royal United Services Institution. OCLC 4986867.
- Gardiner, Robert, ed. (1998). The Naval War of 1812: Caxton pictorial history. Caxton Editions. ISBN 1-84067-360-5.
- Gardiner, Robert (2000). Frigates of the Napoleonic Wars. London: Chatham Publishing.
- Gash, Norman (1984). Lord Liverpool: The Life and Political Career of Robert Banks Jenkinson, Second Earl of Liverpool, 1770–1828. Weidenfeld and Nicolson. ISBN 0-297-78453-6.
- Gilje, Paul A. (1980). "The Baltimore Riots of 1812 and the Breakdown of the Anglo-American Mob Tradition". Journal of Social History. 13 (4). Oxford University Press: 547–564. doi:10.1353/jsh/13.4.547. JSTOR 3787432.
- Gleig, George Robert (1836). The campaigns of the British army at Washington and New Orleans, in the years 1814–1815. Murray, J. OCLC 1041596223.
- Goodman, Warren H. (1941). "The Origins of the War of 1812: A Survey of Changing Interpretations". Mississippi Valley Historical Review. 28 (2): 171–186. doi:10.2307/1896211. JSTOR 1896211.
- Greenspan, Jesse (29 August 2018). "How U.S. Forces Failed to Capture Canada 200 Years Ago". History.com.
- Grodzinski, John R. (September 2010). "Review". Canadian Historical Review. 91 (3): 560–561. doi:10.1353/can.2010.0011. S2CID 162344983.
- Grodzinski, John, ed. (September 2011a). "Instructions to Major-General Sir Edward Pakenham for the New Orleans Campaign". The War of 1812 Magazine (16).
- Grodzinski, John R. (2013). Defender of Canada: Sir George Prevost and the War of 1812. University of Oklahoma Press. ISBN 978-0-8061-5071-0.
- Gwyn, Julian (2003). Frigates and Foremasts: The North American Squadron in Nova Scotian Waters, 1745–1815. UBC Press.
- Hacker, Louis M. (March 1924). "Western Land Hunger and the War of 1812: A Conjecture". Mississippi Valley Historical Review. X (4): 365–395. doi:10.2307/1892931. JSTOR 1892931.
- Hannay, David (1911). "American War of 1812" . In Chisholm, Hugh (ed.). Encyclopædia Britannica. Vol. 1 (11th ed.). Cambridge University Press. pp. 847–849.
- Hannings, Bud (2012). The War of 1812: A Complete Chronology with Biographies of 63 General Officers. McFarland Publishing. p. 50. ISBN 978-0-7864-6385-5.
- Harvey, D. C. (July 1938). "The Halifax–Castine expedition". Dalhousie Review. 18 (2): 207–213.
- Hatter, Lawrence B. A. (2016). Citizens of Convenience: The Imperial Origins of American Nationhood on the U.S.-Canadian Border. University of Virginia Press. ISBN 978-0-8139-3955-1.
- Hatter, B. A. (Summer 2012). "Party Like It's 1812: The War at 200". Tennessee Historical Quarterly. 71 (2). Tennessee Historical Society: 90–111. JSTOR 42628248.
- Hayes, Derek (2008). Canada: An Illustrated History. Douglas & McIntyre. ISBN 978-1-55365-259-5.
- Heidler, David S.; Heidler, Jeanne T., eds. (1997). Encyclopedia of the War of 1812. Naval Institute Press. ISBN 0-87436-968-1.
- Heidler, David S.; Heidler, Jeanne T. (2002). The War of 1812. Westport; London: Greenwood Press. ISBN 0-313-31687-2.
- Heidler, David S.; Heidler, Jeanne T. (2003). Manifest Destiny. Greenwood Press.
- Heller, John Roderick (2010). Democracy's Lawyer: Felix Grundy of the Old Southwest. LSU Press. ISBN 978-0-8071-3742-0.
- Herrick, Carole L. (2005). August 24, 1814: Washington in Flames. Falls Church, Virginia: Higher Education Publications. ISBN 0-914927-50-7.
- Hickey, Donald R. (1978). "Federalist Party Unity and the War of 1812". Journal of American Studies. 12 (1): 23–39. doi:10.1017/S0021875800006162. S2CID 144907975.
- Hickey, Donald R. (1989). The War of 1812: A Forgotten Conflict. Urbana; Chicago: University of Illinois Press. ISBN 0-252-01613-0.
  - The War of 1812: A Forgotten Conflict at Google Books
- Hickey, Donald R. (2012). The War of 1812: A Forgotten Conflict, Bicentennial Edition. Urbana: University of Illinois Press. ISBN 978-0-252-07837-8.
- Hickey, Donald R. (2006). Don't Give Up the Ship! Myths of The War of 1812. Urbana: University of Illinois Press. ISBN 978-0-252-03179-3.
- Hickey, Donald R. (2012z). The War of 1812, A Short History. University of Illinois Press. ISBN 978-0-252-09447-7.
- Hickey, Donald R. (November 2012n). "Small War, Big Consequences: Why 1812 Still Matters". Foreign Affairs. Council on Foreign Relations. Archived from the original on 16 January 2013.
- Hickey, Donald R., ed. (2013). The War of 1812: Writings from America's Second War of Independence. Library of America. New York: Literary Classics of the United States. ISBN 978-1-59853-195-4.
- Hickey, Donald R. (September 2014). "'The Bully Has Been Disgraced by an Infant' – The Naval War of 1812" (PDF). Michigan War Studies Review.
- "Historic Lewinston, New York". Historical Association of Lewiston. Archived from the original on 10 October 2010.
- "History of Sandwich". City of Winsdor. Archived from the original on 26 September 2020.
- Hitsman, J. Mackay (1965). The Incredible War of 1812. Toronto: University of Toronto Press. ISBN 9781896941134.
- Hooks, J. W. (2009). "A friendly salute: The President-Little Belt Affair and the coming of the war of 1812 (PDF) (PhD). University of Alabama. p. ii. Archived from the original (PDF) on 12 April 2019.
- Hooks, Jonathon (Spring 2012). "Redeemed Honor: The President-Little Belt Affair and the Coming of the War of 1812". The Historian. 74 (1). Taylor & Francis, Ltd.: 1–24. doi:10.1111/j.1540-6563.2011.00310.x. ISBN 978-0-679-77673-4. JSTOR 4455772. S2CID 141995607.
- Horsman, Reginald (1962). The Causes of the War of 1812. Philadelphia: University of Pennsylvania Press. ISBN 0-498-04087-9.
- Horsman, Reginald (1967). Expansion and American Indian Policy, 1783–1812 (1992 ed.). University of Oklahoma Press. ISBN 978-0806124223.
- Horsman, Reginald (1987). "On to Canada: Manifest Destiny and United States Strategy in the War of 1812". Michigan Historical Review. 13 (2): 1–24. JSTOR 20173101.
- Howe, Daniel Walker (2007). What Hath God Wrought. Oxford University Press. ISBN 978-0-19-507894-7.
- Hughes, Christine F.; Brodine, Charles E., eds. (2023). The Naval War of 1812: A Documentary History, Vol. 4. Washington: Naval Historical Center (GPO). ISBN 978-1-943604-36-4.
- Hurt, R. Douglas (2002). The Indian Frontier, 1763–1846. UNM Press. ISBN 978-0-8263-1966-1.
- Ingersoll, Charles Jared (1845). Historical sketch of the second war between the United States of America, and Great Britain ... Vol. II. Philadelphia: Lea and Blanchard.
- "Introduction". War of 1812. Galafilm. Archived from the original on 19 January 2000.
- James, William (1817). A Full and Correct Account of the Chief Naval Occurrences of the Late War Between Great Britain and the United States of America ... T. Egerton.
- Johnston, Louis; Williamson, Samuel H. (2019). "What Was the U.S. GDP Then? 1810–1815". Measuring Worth.
- Jortner, Adam (2012). The Gods of Prophetstown: The Battle of Tippecanoe and the Holy War for the Early American Frontier. OUP. ISBN 978-0199765294.
- Kaufman, Erik (1997). "Condemned to Rootlessness: The Loyalist Origins of Canada's Identity Crisis" (PDF). Nationalism and Ethnic Politics. 3 (1): 110–135. doi:10.1080/13537119708428495. S2CID 144562711.
- Kert, Faye M. (2015). Privateering: Patriots and Profits in the War of 1812. Johns Hopkins University Press. ISBN 978-1-4214-1747-9.
- Kessel, William B.; Wooster, Robert (2005). Encyclopedia of Native American Wars and Warfare. Infobase Publishing. ISBN 978-0-8160-3337-9.
- Kilby, William Henry (1888). Eastport and Passamaquoddy: A Collection of Historical and Biographical Sketches. E. E. Shead.
- Kohler, Douglas (2013). "Teaching the War of 1812: Curriculum, Strategies, and Resources". New York History. 94 (3–4). Fenimore Art Museum: 307–318. JSTOR newyorkhist.94.3-4.307.
- Lambert, Andrew (2012). The Challenge: Britain Against America in the Naval War of 1812. Faber and Faber. ISBN 9780571273218.
- Landon, Fred (1941). Western Ontario and the American Frontier. McGill-Queen's Press. ISBN 978-0-7735-9162-2.
- Langguth, A. J. (2006). Union 1812: The Americans Who Fought the Second War of Independence. New York: Simon & Schuster. ISBN 978-0-7432-2618-9.
- Latimer, Jon (2007). 1812: War with America. Cambridge: Belknap Press. ISBN 978-0-674-02584-4.
- Latimer, Jon (2009). Niagara 1814: The Final Invasion. Osprey Publishing. ISBN 978-1-84603-439-8.
- Latour, Arsène Lacarrière (1816). Historical Memoir of the War in West Florida and Louisiana in 1814–15, with an Atlas. Translated from French into English by H.P. Nugent. Philadelphia: John Conrad and Co. OCLC 40119875.
- Laxer, James (2012). Tecumseh and Brock: The War of 1812. House of Anansi Press. ISBN 978-0-88784-261-0.
- Leckie, Robert (1998). The Wars of America. University of Michigan. ISBN 0-06-012571-3.
- Leland, Anne (26 February 2010). American War and Military Operations Casualties: Lists and Statistics: RL32492 (PDF) (Report). Congressional Research Service. Archived from the original (PDF) on 14 May 2023.
- Maass, R. W. (2014). ""Difficult to Relinquish Territory Which Had Been Conquered": Expansionism and the War of 1812". Diplomatic History. 39: 70–97. doi:10.1093/dh/dht132.
- MacDowell, Lillian Ione Rhoades (1900). The Story of Philadelphia. American Book Company. p. 315.
- Mahan, A. T. (1905). "The Negotiations at Ghent in 1814". The American Historical Review. 11 (1): 60–87. doi:10.2307/1832365. JSTOR 1832365.
- Malcomson, Robert (1998). Lords of the Lake: The Naval War on Lake Ontario 1812–1814. Toronto: Robin Brass Studio. ISBN 1-896941-08-7.
- Malcomson, Thomas (2012). "Freedom by Reaching the Wooden World: American Slaves and the British Navy During the War of 1812" (PDF). The Northern Mariner. XXII (4): 361–392. doi:10.25071/2561-5467.294. S2CID 247337446.
- Marsh, James H. (23 October 2011). "Capture of Detroit, War of 1812". Canadian Encyclopedia.
- McPherson, Alan (2013). Encyclopedia of U.S. Military Interventions in Latin America. Vol. 2. ABC-CLIO. p. 699. ISBN 978-1-59884-260-9.
- Millett, Nathaniel (2013). The Maroons of Prospect Bluff and Their Quest for Freedom in the Atlantic World. University Press of Florida. ISBN 978-0-8130-4454-5.
- Morales, Lisa R. (2009). The Financial History of the War of 1812 (PhD dissertation). University of North Texas.
- Nettels, Curtis P. (2017). The Emergence of a National Economy, 1775–1815. Taylor & Francis. ISBN 978-1-315-49675-7.
- Nolan, David J. (2009). "Fort Johnson, Cantonment Davis, and Fort Edwards". In William E. Whittaker (ed.). Frontier Forts of Iowa: Indians, Traders, and Soldiers, 1682–1862. Iowa City: University of Iowa Press. pp. 85–94. ISBN 978-1-58729-831-8. Archived from the original on 5 August 2009.
- Nugent, Walter (2008). Habits of Empire:A History of American Expansionism. New York: Random House. ISBN 978-1-4000-7818-9.
- O'Grady, Jean, ed. (2008). "Canadian and American Values". Interviews with Northrop Frye. Toronto: University of Toronto Press. pp. 887–903. doi:10.3138/9781442688377. ISBN 978-1-4426-8837-7. JSTOR 10.3138/9781442688377.
- Order of the Senate of the United States (1828). Journal of the Executive Proceedings of the Senate of the United States of America. Ohio State University.
- Owsley, Frank Lawrence (Spring 1972). "The Role of the South in the British Grand Strategy in the War of 1812". Tennessee Historical Quarterly. 31 (1): 22–38. JSTOR 42623279.
- Owens, Robert M. (2002). "Jeffersonian Benevolence on the Ground: The Indian Land Cession Treaties of William Henry Harrison". Journal of the Early Republic. 22 (3): 405–435. doi:10.2307/3124810. JSTOR 3124810.
- Owsley, Frank Lawrence (2000). Struggle for the Gulf Borderlands: The Creek War and the Battle of New Orleans, 1812–1815. University of Alabama Press. ISBN 978-0-8173-1062-2.
- Perkins, Bradford (1964). Castereagh and Adams: England and The United States, 1812–1823. Berkeley and Los Angeles: University of California Press. ISBN 9780520009974.
- Pratt, Julius W. (1925). Expansionists of 1812. New York: Macmillan.
- Pratt, Julius W. (1955). A history of United States foreign-policy. Prentice-Hall. ISBN 9780133922820.
- "Proclamation: Province of Upper Canada". Library and Archives Canada. 1812 – via flickr.
- Prohaska, Thomas J. (21 August 2010). "Lewiston monument to mark Tuscarora heroism in War of 1812". The Buffalo News. Archived from the original on 11 June 2011.
- Quimby, Robert S. (1997). The U.S. Army in the War of 1812: An Operational and Command Study. East Lansing: Michigan State University Press. Archived from the original on 27 June 2012 – via Questia.
- Reilly, Robin (1974). The British at the Gates: The New Orleans Campaign in the War of 1812. New York: G. P. Putnam's Sons. ISBN 9780399112669.
- Remini, Robert V. (1977). Andrew Jackson and the Course of American Empire, 1767–1821. New York: Harper & Row Publishers. ISBN 0-8018-5912-3.
- Remini, Robert V. (1991). Henry Clay: Statesman for the Union. W. W. Norton & Co. ISBN 0-393-03004-0.
- Remini, Robert V. (1999). The Battle of New Orleans: Andrew Jackson and America's First Military Victory. London: Penguin Books. ISBN 0-14-100179-8.
- Remini, Robert V. (2002). Andrew Jackson and His Indian Wars. London: Penguin Books. ISBN 0-14-200128-7.
- Ridler, Jason (4 March 2015). "Battle of Stoney Creek". The Canadian Encyclopedia.
- Riggs, Thomas, ed. (2015). "War of 1812". Gale Encyclopedia of U.S. Economic History. Vol. 3 (illustrated 2nd ed.). Cengage Gale. ISBN 978-1-57302-757-1.
- Risjord, Norman K. (1961). "1812: Conservatives, War Hawks, and the Nation's Honor". William and Mary Quarterly. 18 (2): 196–210. doi:10.2307/1918543. JSTOR 1918543.
- Rodger, N. A. M. (2005). Command of the Ocean. London: Penguin Books. ISBN 0-14-028896-1.
- Rodriguez, Junius P. (2002). The Louisiana Purchase: A Historical and Geographical Encyclopedia. Santa Barbara, California: ABC-CLIO. ISBN 978-1-57607-188-5.
- Roosevelt, Theodore (1904). The Naval War of 1812. Vol. I. New York and London: G. P. Putnam's Sons.
- Roosevelt, Theodore (1900). The Naval War of 1812. Vol. II. Annapolis: Naval Institute Press.
- Rosentreter, Roger (2003). Michigan's Early Military Forces: A Roster and History of Troops Activated Prior to the American Civil War. Great Lakes Books. ISBN 0-8143-3081-9.
- Smith, Joshua (2007). Borderland Smuggling. Gainesville: University Press of Florida. ISBN 978-0-8130-2986-3.
- Smith, Joshua (2011). Battle for the Bay: The War of 1812. Fredericton, New Brunswick: Goose Lane Editions. ISBN 978-0-86492-644-9.
- Sjolander, Claire Turenner (2014). "Through the Looking Glass: Canadian Identity and the War of 1812". International Journal. 69 (2): 152–167. doi:10.1177/0020702014527892. S2CID 145286750.
- Stagg, John C. A. (January 1981). "James Madison and the Coercion of Great Britain: Canada, the West Indies, and the War of 1812". William and Mary Quarterly. 38 (1): 3–34. doi:10.2307/1916855. ISBN 978-0-521-89820-1. JSTOR 1916855.
- Stagg, John C. A. (1983). Mr. Madison's War: Politics, Diplomacy, and Warfare in the Early American Republic, 1783–1830. Princeton, NJ: Princeton University Press. ISBN 9780691047027.
- Stagg, John C. A. (2012). The War of 1812: Conflict for a Continent. Cambridge Essential Histories. ISBN 978-0-521-72686-3.
- Stanley, George F. G. (1983). The War of 1812: Land Operations. Macmillan of Canada. ISBN 0-7715-9859-9.
- Starkey, Armstrong (2002). European and Native American Warfare 1675–1815. Routledge. ISBN 978-1-135-36339-0.
- Stearns, Peter N., ed. (2008). The Oxford Encyclopedia of the Modern World. Vol. 7. p. 547.
- Stewart, Richard W., ed. (2005). "Chapter 6: The War of 1812". American Military History, Volume 1: The United States Army and the Forging of a Nation, 1775–1917. Washington, DC: Center of Military History, United States Army. Archived from the original on 12 December 2007 – via history.army.mil.
- Stranack, Ian (1990). The Andrew and the Onions: The Story of the Royal Navy in Bermuda, 1795–1975 (2nd ed.). Bermuda Maritime Museum Press. ISBN 978-0-921560-03-6.
- Sugden, John (January 1982). "The Southern Indians in the War of 1812: The Closing Phase". Florida Historical Quarterly. 60 (3): 273–312. JSTOR 30146793.
- "Summer 1812: Congress stages fiery debates over whether to declare war on Britain". U.S. National Park Service.
- Swanson, Neil H. (1945). The Perilous Fight: Being a Little Known and Much Abused Chapter of Our National History in Our Second War of Independence. Recounted Mainly from Contemporary Records. Farrar and Rinehart.
- Sword, Wiley (1985). President Washington's Indian War: The Struggle for the Old Northwest, 1790–1795. University of Oklahoma Press. ISBN 978-0806118642.
- Taylor, Alan (2007). The Divided Ground: Indians, Settlers, and the Northern Borderland of the American Revolution. Vintage Books. ISBN 978-1-4000-4265-4.
- Taylor, Alan (2010). The Civil War of 1812: American Citizens, British Subjects, Irish Rebels, & Indian Allies. Knopf Doubleday Publishing Group. ISBN 978-1-4000-4265-4.
- Taylor, Matthew (2026). Black Redcoats: The Corps of Colonial Marines (second ed.). Barnsley, Yorkshire: Pen and Sword Books. ISBN 978-1-39-903402-9.
- Thompson, John Herd; Randall, Stephen J. (2008). Canada and the United States: Ambivalent Allies. University of Georgia Press. ISBN 978-0-8203-3113-3.
- Toll, Ian W. (2006). Six Frigates: The Epic History of the Founding of the U.S. Navy. New York: W. W. Norton. ISBN 978-0-393-05847-5.
- Trautsch, Jasper M. (January 2013). "The Causes of the War of 1812: 200 Years of Debate". Journal of Military History. 77 (1): 273–293.
- Tucker, Spencer C., ed. (2011). The Encyclopedia of North American Indian Wars, 1607–1890: A Political, Social, and Military History [3 volumes]. ABC-CLIO. p. 1097. ISBN 978-1-85109-603-9.
- Tucker, Spencer C. (2012). The Encyclopedia of the War of 1812. Vol. 1 (illustrated ed.). Santa Barbara, California: ABC-CLIO. ISBN 978-1-85109-956-6.
- Turner, Wesley B. (2011). The Astonishing General: The Life and Legacy of Sir Isaac Brock. Dundurn Press. ISBN 9781459700079.
- "War of 1812 Overview". USS Constitution Museum. 17 August 2019.
- Updyke, Frank Arthur (1915). The Diplomacy of the War of 1812. Johns Hopkins University Press.
- "The War of 1812: (1812–1815)". National Guard History eMuseum. Commonwealth of Kentucky. Archived from the original on 2 March 2009.
- Voelcker, Tim, ed. (2013). Broke of the Shannon and the war of 1812. Barnsley: Seaforth Publishing.
- Ward, A. W.; Gooch, G. P. (1922). The Cambridge History of British Foreign Policy, 1783–1919: 1783–1815. Macmillan Company.
- Waselkov, Gregory A. (2009) [2006]. A Conquering Spirit: Fort Mims and the Redstick War of 1813–1814 (illustrated ed.). University of Alabama Press. ISBN 978-0-8173-5573-9.
- Webed, William (2013). Neither Victor nor Vanquished: America in the War of 1812. University of Nebraska Press, Potomac Books. doi:10.2307/j.ctt1ddr8tx. ISBN 978-1-61234-607-6. JSTOR j.ctt1ddr8tx.
- "We Have Met The Enemy, and They are Ours". Dictionary of American History. Encyclopedia.com.
- Weiss, John McNish (2013). "The Corps of Colonial Marines: Black freedom fighters of the War of 1812". Mcnish and Weiss. Archived from the original on 8 February 2018.
- Second Duke of Wellington, ed. (1862). "The Earl of Liverpool to Viscount Castlereagh". Supplementary despatches, correspondence and memoranda of the Duke of Wellington, K. G. Vol. 9. London: John Murray. OCLC 60466520.
- White, Richard (2010). The Middle Ground: Indians, Empires, and Republics in the Great Lakes Region, 1650–1815. Cambridge University Press. ISBN 978-1-107-00562-4.
- Whitfield, Harvey Amani (September 2005). "The Development of Black Refugee Identity in Nova Scotia, 1813–1850". Left History: An Interdisciplinary Journal of Historical Inquiry and Debate. 10 (2). doi:10.25071/1913-9632.5679.
- Whitfield, Harvey Amani (2006). Blacks on the Border: The Black Refugees in British North America, 1815–1860. University of Vermont Press. ISBN 978-1-58465-606-7.
- Wilentz, Sean (2005). Andrew Jackson. New York: Henry Holt and Co. ISBN 0-8050-6925-9.
- Willig, Timothy D. (2008). Restoring the Chain of Friendship: British Policy and the Indians of the Great Lakes, 1783–1815 (2014 ed.). University of Nebraska Press. ISBN 978-0-8032-4817-5.
- Wolf, Joshua J. (2015). "The Misfortune to Get Pressed:" The Impressment of American Seamen and the Ramifications on the United States, 1793–1812 (PDF) (PhD). University of Virginia Press. Archived from the original (PDF) on 22 April 2021.
- Woodworth, Samuel (4 July 1812). "The War". The War. New York: S. Woodworth & Co – via Internet Archive.
- Zimmerman, Scott Fulton (1925). Impressment of American Seamen. Columbia University.
