= 1980 in literature =

This article contains information about the literary events and publications of 1980.

== Events ==
- March 6 – Marguerite Yourcenar becomes the first woman elected to the Académie française.
- June 5
  - The Royal Shakespeare Company opens a production at the Aldwych Theatre, London, of The Life and Adventures of Nicholas Nickleby, adapted from Charles Dickens's novel by David Edgar.
  - Willy Russell's comedy Educating Rita opens in a Royal Shakespeare Company production with Julie Walters in the title rôle, at The Warehouse in London.
- September – A production of Shakespeare's Macbeth with Peter O'Toole in the lead opens at the Old Vic Theatre, London. It is often seen one of the disasters in theatre history.
- September 23 – The Field Day Theatre Company presents its first production, the première of Brian Friel's Translations, at the Guildhall, Derry, Northern Ireland.
- November 27 – The English playwright Harold Pinter marries the biographer and novelist Lady Antonia Fraser after divorcing the actress Vivien Merchant.
- December 8 – Mark David Chapman shoots John Lennon to death in New York City while carrying a copy of J. D. Salinger's 1951 novel The Catcher in the Rye, which he claims "is my statement."
- December 19 – Guatemalan poet Alaíde Foppa is abducted and never seen again.
- unknown dates
  - Kane and Abel by Jeffrey Archer (published 1979), tops The New York Times Best Seller list.
  - Vasily Grossman's novel Life and Fate ("Жизнь и судьба", completed 1959) is published for the first time, in Switzerland.
  - The first Tibetan-language literature journal, Tibetan Literature and Art (Bod kyi rtsom rig sgyu rtsal), is published by the Tibet Autonomous Region Writers Association (TARWA); it features short stories.
  - The novella "An Old Song", published anonymously in 1877 in the magazine London, is identified as Robert Louis Stevenson's first published work of fiction.

== New books ==
=== Fiction ===
- Douglas Adams – The Restaurant at the End of the Universe
- Woody Allen – Side Effects
- V. C. Andrews – Petals on the Wind
- Jean M. Auel – The Clan of the Cave Bear
- Thomas Berger – Neighbors
- Gary Brandner – Walkers
- Anthony Burgess – Earthly Powers
- Ramsey Campbell, editor – New Tales of the Cthulhu Mythos
- Jack L. Chalker (Well World)
  - The Return of Nathan Brazil (fourth in the Well of Souls series)
  - Twilight at the Well of Souls (fifth in the Well of Souls series)
- Bruce Chatwin – The Viceroy of Ouidah
- Mary Higgins Clark – The Cradle Will Fall
- J. M. Coetzee – Waiting for the Barbarians
- Larry Collins and Dominique Lapierre – The Fifth Horseman
- Pat Conroy – The Lords of Discipline
- Basil Copper – Necropolis
- Michael Crichton – Congo
- L. Sprague de Camp
  - Conan and the Spider God
  - The Purple Pterodactyls
- Brian Daley – Han Solo and the Lost Legacy
- E. L. Doctorow – Loon Lake
- Allan W. Eckert – Song of the Wild
- Umberto Eco – The Name of the Rose (Il Nome della Rosa)
- Dennis Etchison
  - The Fog (film novelization)
  - The Shudder
- Ken Follett – The Key to Rebecca
- John M. Ford – Web of Angels
- Frederick Forsyth – The Devil's Alternative
- George Gipe
  - Melvin and Howard (film novelization)
  - Resurrection (film novelization)
- Donald F. Glut – The Empire Strikes Back
- Mary Jayne Gold – Crossroads Marseilles 1940
- William Golding – Rites of Passage
- Graham Greene – Dr. Fischer of Geneva
- Robert A. Heinlein – The Number of the Beast
- James Herbert – The Dark
- Douglas Hill
  - Day of the Starwind
  - Deathwing Over Veynaa
- Robert E. Howard and L. Sprague de Camp – The Treasure of Tranicos
- Hammond Innes – Solomon's Seal
- P. D. James – Innocent Blood
- Stephen King – Firestarter
- Dean Koontz
  - The Funhouse (film novelization)
  - The Voice of the Night
  - Whispers
- Judith Krantz – Princess Daisy
- Björn Kurtén – Dance of the Tiger
- Manuel Mujica Láinez – El gran teatro
- Derek Lambert – I, Said the Spy
- John le Carré – Smiley's People
- Madeleine L'Engle – A Ring of Endless Light
- Robert Ludlum – The Bourne Identity
- Eric Van Lustbader – The Ninja
- Ngaio Marsh – Photo Finish
- Mike McQuay – Lifekeeper
- James A. Michener – The Covenant
- William F. Nolan – Logan's Search
- Cees Nooteboom – Rituals

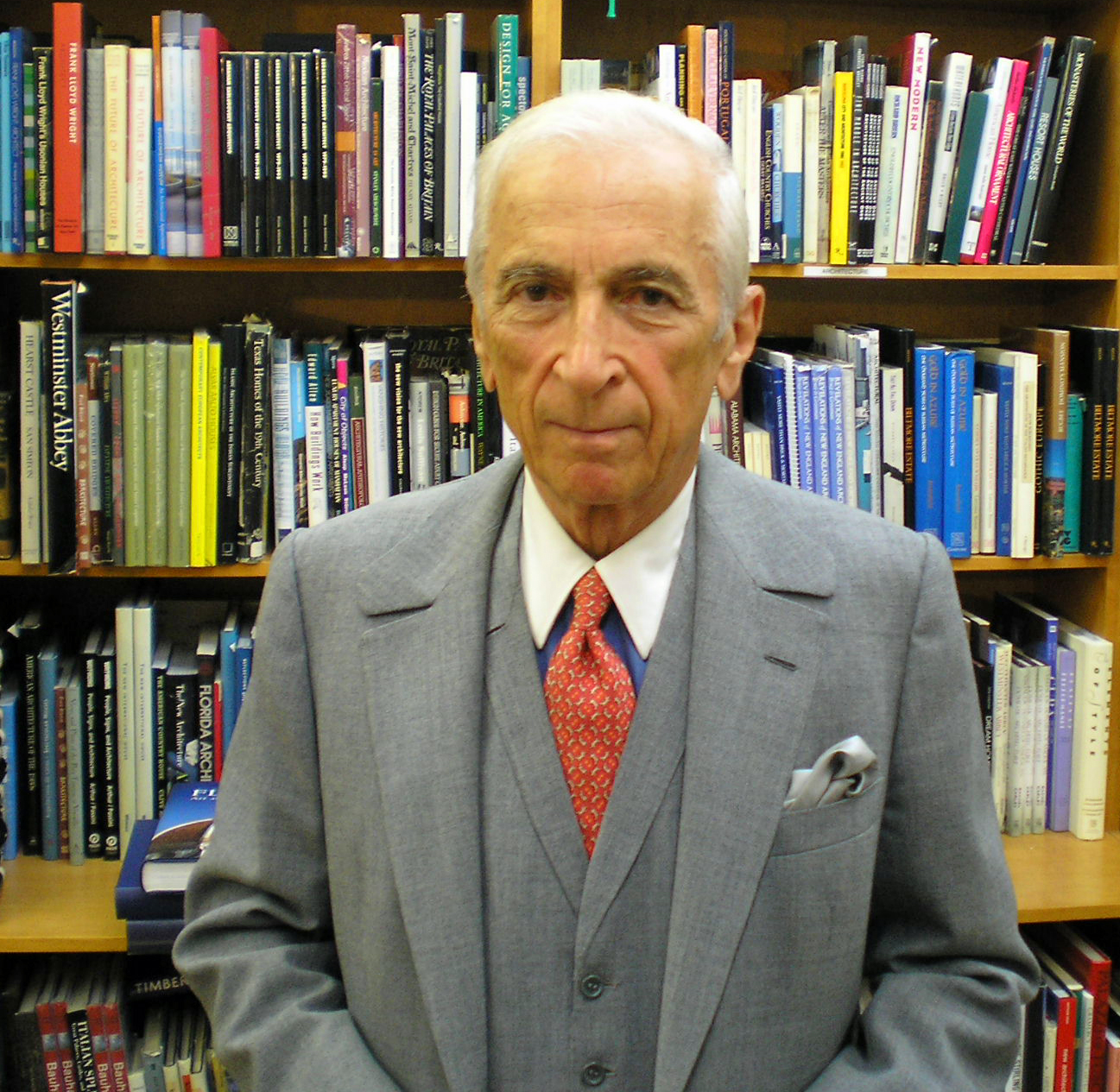
Gay Talese

- Robert B. Parker – Looking for Rachel Wallace
- Pepetela – Mayombe
- Ellis Peters – Monk's Hood
- Tom Phillips – A Humument: a treated Victorian novel (1st trade edition)
- Belva Plain – Random Winds
- Paulette Poujol-Oriol – Le Creuset (The Crucible)
- Marin Preda – Cel mai iubit dintre pământeni (The Most Beloved of Earthlings)
- Barbara Pym (died 1980) – Crampton Hodnet (written 1940)
- A. J. Quinnell – Man on Fire
- Herman Raucher – There Should Have Been Castles
- Mordecai Richler – Joshua Then and Now
- Marilynne Robinson – Housekeeping
- Sidney Sheldon – Rage of Angels
- Clifford D. Simak – The Visitors
- Julian Symons – Sweet Adelaide
- Gay Talese – Thy Neighbor's Wife
- Walter Tevis – Mockingbird
- John Kennedy Toole (suicide 1969) – A Confederacy of Dunces
- Colin Wilson – Starseekers
- Gene Wolfe – The Shadow of the Torturer
- Roger Zelazny
  - Changeling
  - The Last Defender of Camelot

=== Children and young people ===
- Richard Adams
  - The Girl in a Swing
  - The Iron Wolf and Other Stories
- Vivien Alcock – The Haunting of Cassie Palmer
- Pamela Allen – Mr Archimedes' Bath
- Lynne Reid Banks – The Indian in the Cupboard
- Jill Barklem – Brambly Hedge series:
  - Spring Story
  - Summer Story
  - Autumn Story
  - Winter Story
- Ruskin Bond – The Cherry Tree
- Matt Christopher – Wild Pitch
- Roald Dahl – The Twits
- David Mckee - Not Now, Bernard Not Now, Bernard
- Thomas M. Disch – The Brave Little Toaster
- Buchi Emecheta – Titch the Cat
- Gordon Korman – Beware the Fish
- Ruth Manning-Sanders – A Book of Spooks and Spectres
- Thomas Meehan – Annie: An old-fashioned story
- Robert Munsch – The Paper Bag Princess
- Susan Musgrave
  - Gullband
  - Hag Head
- Ruth Park – Playing Beatie Bow
- Marjorie W. Sharmat – Gila Monsters Meet you at the Airport
- Mary Stewart – A Walk in Wolf Wood
- Eric Hill – Where's Spot?
- Janet and Allan Ahlberg – Funnybones
- Pam Adams – Mrs Honey's Hat

=== Drama ===
- Howard Brenton – The Romans in Britain
- Andrea Dunbar – The Arbor
- David Edgar (adaptation) – The Life and Adventures of Nicholas Nickleby
- Ronald Harwood – The Dresser
- Ron Hutchinson – The Irish Play
- Kenneth Ross – Breaker Morant
- Willy Russell – Educating Rita
- Sam Shepard – True West

=== Poetry ===
- Valerio Magrelli – Ora serrata retinae
- Oxford Book of Contemporary Verse

=== Non-fiction ===
- Tony Benn – Arguments for Socialism
- Pierre Berton – The Invasion of Canada
- Maryanne Blacker and Pamela Clark – Australian Women's Weekly Children's Birthday Cake Book
- David Bohm – Wholeness and the Implicate Order
- L. Sprague de Camp – The Ragged Edge of Science
- L. Sprague de Camp (as editor) – The Spell of Conan
- Graham Chapman et al. – A Liar's Autobiography
- Marilyn Ferguson – The Aquarian Conspiracy
- Stanley Fish – Is There a Text in This Class? The Authority of Interpretive Communities
- Julien Gracq – Reading Writing
- Graham Greene – Ways of Escape
- Jerry Hopkins and Danny Sugerman – No One Here Gets Out Alive
- Pauline Kael – When the Lights Go Down
- János Kornai – Economics of Shortage (Hiány)
- Paul H. Lewis – Paraguay Under Stroessner
- Samuel Liddell MacGregor Mathers – Grimoire of Armadel translation from French (posthumous)
- Michael Medved and Harry Medved – The Golden Turkey Awards
- Tom O'Carroll – Paedophilia: The Radical Case
- Carl Sagan – Cosmos
- Anastasio Somoza Debayle and Jack Cox – Nicaragua Betrayed
- D. I. Suchianu – Nestemate cinematografice (Cinematic Pearls)
- Ram Swarup – The Word as Revelation: Names of Gods
- Alvin Toffler – The Third Wave
- Bertram Myron Gross – Friendly Fascism: The New Face of Power in America

== Births ==
- January 1 – Satya Vyas, Indian (Hindi language) writer
- May 1 – Jacek Dehnel, Polish poet, writer and translator
- May 10 – Cristina Nemerovschi, Romanian writer
- May 27 – Majlinda Nana Rama, Albanian pedagogue, writer and researcher
- June 5 – Nestan Kvinikadze, Georgian writer, scriptwriter and journalist
- July 30 - Celeste Ng, American novelist
- September 11 – Dawit Kebede, Ethiopian journalist and publisher
- October 29 – Louie Jon Agustin Sanchez, Philippine poet, fiction writer, critic and journalist
- November 23 – Ishmael Beah, Siera Leonean author and human rights activist

== Deaths ==
- January 3
  - Joy Adamson, Silesian-born conservationist and writer living in Kenya (murdered, born 1910)
  - George Sutherland Fraser, Scottish poet and critic (born 1915)
- January 11 – Barbara Pym, English novelist (cancer, born 1913)
- January 21 – Irene Rathbone, English novelist (born 1892)
- February 25 – Caradog Prichard, Welsh poet and novelist in Welsh (born 1904)
- March 12 – Eugeniu Ștefănescu-Est, Romanian poet, novelist and cartoonist (born 1881)
- March 17 – P. M. Hubbard, English crime writer (born 1910)
- March 25 – James Wright, American poet (born 1927)
- March 26 – Roland Barthes, French literary theorist (born 1915)
- March 27 – Idris Jamma', Sudanese poet (died 1980)
- April 6 – John Collier, English-born American short story writer (born 1901)
- April 15 – Jean-Paul Sartre, French philosopher, novelist and dramatist (born 1905)
- April 24 – Alejo Carpentier, French Cuban novelist and writer (cancer, born 1904)
- May 7 – Margaret Cole, English political writer, biographer and activist (born 1893)
- May 16 – Marin Preda, Romanian novelist (asphyxiation, born 1922)
- June 7
  - Salvator Gotta, Italian writer (born 1887)
  - Henry Miller, American novelist (born 1891)
- June 20 – Amy Key Clarke, English mystical poet (born 1892)
- June 27 – Carey McWilliams, American author, editor and lawyer (born 1905)
- July 1 – C. P. Snow, English novelist and scientist (born 1905)
- July 6 – Mart Raud, Estonian poet, playwright and writer (born 1903)
- July 9 – Vinicius de Moraes, Brazilian poet and songwriter (born 1913)
- July 17 – Traian Herseni, Romanian social scientist and journalist (born 1907)
- July 23 – Olivia Manning, English novelist and poet (born 1908)
- July 26 – Kenneth Tynan, English-born theater critic (pulmonary emphysema, born 1927)
- August 8 – David Mercer, English dramatist (born 1928)
- August 10 – Gareth Evans, British philosopher (lung cancer, born 1946)
- September 18 – Katherine Anne Porter, American novelist and essayist (born 1890)
- September 19 – Jacky Gillott, English novelist (suicide, born 1939)
- October 26 – Sam Cree, Northern Irish playwright (born 1928)
- November 9 – Patrick Campbell, Irish journalist and wit (born 1913)
- December 2 – Romain Gary (Roman Kacew), French novelist (suicide, born 1914)
- December 8 – John Lennon, English musician, songwriter and author (murdered, born 1940)
- December 12 – Ben Travers, English playwright, screenwriter and novelist (born 1886)
- December 14 – Nichita Smochină, Transnistrian Romanian ethnographer and journalist (born 1894)
- December 21
  - Marc Connelly, American playwright (born 1890)
  - Nelson Rodrigues, Brazilian playwright, journalist and novelist (born 1912)
- December 27 – Todhunter Ballard, American genre novelist (born 1903)
- December 31 – Marshall McLuhan, Canadian philosopher (born 1911)

== Awards ==
- Nobel Prize for Literature: Czesław Miłosz

=== Australia ===
- The Australian/Vogel Literary Award: Inaugural award to Archie Weller, The Day Of The Dog; the award is initially given to Paul Radley, who, in 1996, admits that his manuscript was actually written by his uncle.
- Kenneth Slessor Prize for Poetry: David Campbell, Man in the Honeysuckle
- Miles Franklin Award: Jessica Anderson, The Impersonators

=== Canada ===
- See 1980 Governor General's Awards for a complete list of winners and finalists for those awards.

=== France ===
- Prix Goncourt: Yves Navarre, Le Jardin d'acclimatation
- Prix Médicis French: Jean-Luc Benoziglio, Cabinet-portrait who refused the prize, thus it was given to Jean Lahougue's Comptine des Height
- Prix Médicis International: Andre Brink, Une saison blanche et sèche

=== United Kingdom ===
- Booker Prize: William Golding, Rites of Passage
- Carnegie Medal for children's literature: Peter Dickinson, City of Gold
- Cholmondeley Award: George Barker, Terence Tiller, Roy Fuller
- Eric Gregory Award: Robert Minhinnick, Michael Hulse, Blake Morrison, Medbh McGuckian
- James Tait Black Memorial Prize:
  - Fiction: J. M. Coetzee, Waiting for the Barbarians
  - Biography: Robert B. Martin, Tennyson: The Unquiet Heart
- Whitbread Best Book Award: David Lodge, How Far Can You Go?

=== United States ===
- American Academy of Arts and Letters Gold Medal for Drama: Edward Albee
- Caldecott Medal: Barbara Cooney, Ox-Cart Man
- Dos Passos Prize: Graham Greene
- Nebula Award: Gregory Benford, Timescape
- Newbery Medal for children's literature: Joan Blos, A Gathering of Days: A New England Girl's Journal
- Pulitzer Prize:
  - Drama: Lanford Wilson, Talley's Folly
  - Fiction: Norman Mailer, The Executioner's Song
  - Poetry: Donald Justice, Selected Poems
- Hugo Award:
  - Best Novella: Barry B. Longyear, Enemy Mine

=== Elsewhere ===
- Friedenspreis des Deutschen Buchhandels: Ernesto Cardenal
- Hugo Award for Best Novel: Arthur C. Clarke, The Fountains of Paradise
- Premio Cervantes : Juan Carlos Onetti
- Premio Nadal: Juan Ramón Zaragoza, Concerto grosso

== Notes ==
- Hahn, Daniel (2015). The Oxford Companion to Children's Literature (2nd ed.). Oxford. University Press. ISBN 9780198715542.
