= Voice in the Night =

Voice(s) in the Night or The Voice(s) in the Night or A Voice(s) in the Night may refer to:

== Books and stories ==
- "The Voice in the Night" (short story), a story by William Hope Hodgson
- Voices in the Night, a 1900 novel by Flora Annie Steel
- Voices in the Night: Stories, a 2015 collection of short fiction by Steven Millhauser
- Voices in the Night, a 1994 novel by Andrew Coburn

== Films ==
- Voice in the Night (film), a 1934 American action film
- Freedom Radio (American title: A Voice in the Night), a 1941 British anti-Nazi film
- Voices in the Night (Las voces de la noche), a 2003 Spanish film
- The Voice in the Night (film), a 1916 American silent drama film

== Television episodes ==
- "Voice in the Night", from William Tell 1958
- "Voice in the Night", from Barnaby Jones 1976
- "The Voice in the Night", from The Legend of Korra
- "The Voice in the Night", from Suspicion 1958

== Music ==
- Voice in the Night (album), a 1999 album by Charles Lloyd, or the title song
- A Voice in the Night, a 2005 album by Carla White
- Voices in the Night, a 2007 album by Twelfth Night
- Voices in the Night, a 2010 EP by Silverline
- A Voice in the Night, a pseudo piano concerto written by Mischa Spoliansky for the 1946 film Wanted for Murder
- "Voices (In the Night)", a song by Agent Orange from the 1986 album This Is the Voice

== See also ==
- The Voice of the Night, a Dean Koontz novel
- Voices of the Night, an orchestral work by Lennox Berkeley
