= Bibliography of the War of 1812 =

The War of 1812 bibliography is a selective, annotated bibliography using APA style citations of the many books related to the War of 1812. There are thousands of books and articles written about this topic. Only the most useful are presented.

== Overviews ==
- Adams, Henry (1986) [1891]. History of the United States of America During the Administrations of James Madison. Library of America. ISBN 978-0-940450-35-6.
  - Wills, Garry (2005). Henry Adams and the Making of America. Houghton Mifflin Harcourt. ISBN 0-618-87266-3. is a close reading of Adams's history.
- Horsman, Reginald (1969). War of 1812. Eyre & Spottiswoode. ISBN 9780413271402.
- Berton, Pierre (1980). The Invasion of Canada: 1812–1813. Doubleday Canada. ISBN 978-0-385-67360-0.
- Berton, Pierre (1981). Flames Across the Border: 1813–1814. Doubleday Canada. ISBN 978-0-385-67359-4.
- Benn, Carl (2008). The War of 1812. Osprey. ISBN 978-1-84176-466-5. short overview.
- Berton, Pierre (2011). Pierre Berton's War of 1812. Doubleday Canada. ISBN 978-0-385-67650-2.
- Bickham, Troy (2012). The Weight of Vengeance: The United States, the British Empire, and the War of 1812. Oxford University Press. ISBN 978-0-19-539178-7.
- Black, Jeremy (2009). The War of 1812 in the Age of Napoleon. University of Oklahoma Press. ISBN 978-0-8061-4521-1. by English military historian
- Borneman, Walter R. (2004). 1812: The War That Forged a Nation. HarperCollins. ISBN 978-0-06-053112-6., popular
- Gilje, Paul A. (2013). Free Trade and Sailors' Rights in the War of 1812. Cambridge University Press. ISBN 978-1-107-02508-0.
- Heidler, David Stephen; Heidler, Jeanne T., eds. (2004). Encyclopedia of the War of 1812. Naval Institute Press. ISBN 978-1-59114-362-8. most comprehensive guide; 500 entries by 70 scholars from several countries
- Hickey, Donald R. (2006). Don't Give Up the Ship!: Myths of the War of 1812. Robin Brass Studio. ISBN 978-1-896941-45-5.
- Hickey, Donald R (2012). The War of 1812: A Forgotten Conflict (Bicentennial ed.). University of Illinois Press. ISBN 978-0-252-07837-8. standard scholarly history
- Hickey, Donald R. (2012). 187 Things You Should Know about the War of 1812: An Easy Question-and-Answer Guide. Maryland Historical Society. ISBN 978-0-9842135-2-8.
- Hitsman, J. M. The Incredible War of 1812 (1965), survey by Canadian scholar
- Langguth, A. J. Union 1812: The Americans Who Fought the Second War of Independence (2006) 495 pp, popular history
- Latimer, Jon, 1812: War with America (Harvard, 2007). A scholarly British perspective ISBN 0-674-02584-9
- Mahon, John K. War of 1812 (University of Florida Press 1972). Overall military history.
- Malcomson, Robert. Historical Dictionary of the War of 1812 (Landham, Md.: Scarecrow Press, 2006). ISBN 0-8108-5499-6, 699 pp
- Misiak, Zig, "War of 1812: Highlighting Native Nations", 2012, ISBN 978-0-9811880-5-8 website
- Smith, Gene Allen. The Slaves' Gamble: Choosing Sides in the War of 1812 (Palgrave Macmillan, 2013).
- Stagg, J.C.A. The War of 1812: Conflict for a Continent (Cambridge Essential Histories, 2012) ISBN 0-521-72686-7
- Suthren, Victor. The War of 1812 (1999). ISBN 0-7710-8317-3
- Sweeny, Alastair. Fire Along the Frontier: Great Battles of the War of 1812 (Dundurn, 2012). ISBN 978-1-4597-0433-6; Resource Site; popular history by Canadian journalist
- Taylor, Alan. The Civil War of 1812: American Citizens, British Subjects, Irish Rebels, & Indian Allies (2010) by Pulitzer Prize winner
- Tucker, Spencer C., ed. The Encyclopedia of the War of 1812 (3 vol: ABC-CLIO, 2012), 1034 pp
- Zuehlke, Mark. For Honour's Sake: The War of 1812 and the Brokering of an Uneasy Peace. (2007) by Canadian military historian

=== Historiography ===
- Campbell, Duncan Andrew (2015). "The Bicentennial of the War of 1812: Reconsidering the "Forgotten Conflict"". American Nineteenth Century History. 16 (1): 1–10. doi:10.1080/14664658.2014.969503. S2CID 143699851.
- Cleves, Rachel Hope; Eustace, Nicole; Gilje, Paul (September 2012). "Interchange: The War of 1812". Journal of American History. 99 (2): 520–555. doi:10.1093/jahist/jas236.
- Goodman, Warren H. (September 1941). "The Origins of the War of 1812: A Survey of Changing Interpretations". Mississippi Valley Historical Review. 28 (2): 171–186. doi:10.2307/1896211. JSTOR 1896211.
- Grodzinski, John R. (October 2012). "Opening Shots from the Bicentenary of the War of 1812: Canadian Perspective on Recent Titles". The Journal of Military History. 76 (4): 1187–1201.
- Hatter, Lawrence B.A. (Summer 2012). "Party Like It's 1812: The War at 200". Tennessee Historical Quarterly. 71 (1): 90–111. JSTOR 42628248.
- Hickey, Donald R. (September 2013). "1812: The Old History and the New". Reviews in American History. 41 (3): 436–444. doi:10.1353/rah.2013.0081. S2CID 144136235.
- Hickey, Donald R. (2001). "The War of 1812: Still a Forgotten Conflict?". The Journal of Military History. 65 (3): 741–769. doi:10.2307/2677533. JSTOR 2677533.
- Jensen, Richard (October 2012). "Military History on the Electronic Frontier: Wikipedia Fights the War of 1812" (PDF). The Journal of Military History. 76 (4): 523–556. Archived from the original on 2017-12-03.
- Nivola, Pietro S.; Kastor, Peter J., eds. (2012). What So Proudly We Hailed: Essays on the Contemporary Meanings of the War of 1812. Brookings Institution Press. ISBN 978-0-8157-2415-5.
- Stacey, C. P. (1964). "The War of 1812 in Canadian History". In Zaslow, Morris (ed.). The Defended Border: Upper Canada and the War of 1812. Toronto: Macmillan of Canada. OCLC 480289.
- Stoltz, Joseph F. (2017). A Bloodless Victory: The Battle of New Orleans in History and Memory. Johns Hopkins University Press, 2017. ISBN 978-1-42-142302-9.
- Trautsch, Jasper M. (January 2013). "The Causes of the War of 1812: 200 Years of Debate" (PDF). The Journal of Military History. 77 (1): 273–293.
- Peskin, Lawrence A. (December 2011). "Conspiratorial Anglophobia and the War of 1812". The Journal of American History. 98 (3). Oxford University Press: 647–669. doi:10.1093/jahist/jar431. JSTOR 41510113.
- Stagg, J. C. A. (Spring 1980). "The Coming of the War of 1812: The View from the Presidency". The Quarterly Journal of the Library of Congress. 37 (2). Library of Congress: 223–241. JSTOR 29781853.

=== Journal ===
- Journal of the War of 1812 complete text

== Causes and diplomacy ==
- Brown, Roger H. The Republic in Peril: 1812 (1964), on American politics
- Burt, Alfred L. The United States, Great Britain, and British North America from the Revolution to the Establishment of Peace after the War of 1812.
- Carr, Albert Z., The Coming of War: An Account of the Remarkable Events Leading to the War of 1812, (Doubleday, 1960)
- Goodman, Warren H. (September 1941). "The Origins of the War of 1812: A Survey of Changing Interpretations". Mississippi Valley Historical Review. 28 (2): 171–186. doi:10.2307/1896211. JSTOR 1896211.
- Hickey, Donald R. "The War of 1812" in Julian E. Zelizer, ed. The American Congress (2004), pp. 93–111
- Horsman, Reginald. The Causes of the War of 1812. (1962). ISBN 0-498-04087-9
- Horsman, Reginald (March 1957). "Western War Aims, 1811–1812". Indiana Magazine of History. 53 (1): 1–18. JSTOR 27788414.
- Kaplan, Lawrence S. (March 1964). "France and Madison's Decision for War 1812". Mississippi Valley Historical Review. 50 (4): 652–671. doi:10.2307/1916658. JSTOR 1916658.
- Perkins, Bradford. Prologue to War: England and the United States, 1805–1812. 1961.
- Perkins, Bradford. Castlereagh and Adams: England and the United States, 1812–1823 (1964) excerpt; online review
- Pratt, Julius W. Expansionists of 1812. (1925)
- Pratt, Julius W. (June 1925). "Western War Aims in the War of 1812". Mississippi Valley Historical Review. 12 (1): 36–50. doi:10.2307/1891784. JSTOR 1891784.
- Risjord, Norman K. (April 1961). "1812: Conservatives, War Hawks, and the Nation's Honor". William and Mary Quarterly. 3rd. 18 (2): 196–210. doi:10.2307/1918543. JSTOR 1918543.
- Rutland, Robert A. The Presidency of James Madison (1990)
- Smelser, Marshall. The Democratic Republic 1801–1815 (1968). general survey of American politics and diplomacy
- Stagg, John C. A. Mr. Madison's War: Politics, Diplomacy, and Warfare in the Early American republic, 1783–1830. (1983).
- Stagg, J.C.A. (October 1976). "James Madison and the 'Malcontents': The Political Origins of the War of 1812". William and Mary Quarterly. 33 (4): 557–585. doi:10.2307/1921716. JSTOR 1921716.
- Stagg, J.C.A. (January 1981). "James Madison and the Coercion of Great Britain: Canada, the West Indies, and the War of 1812". The William and Mary Quarterly. 38 (1): 4–34. doi:10.2307/1916855. JSTOR 1916855.
- Taylor, George Rogers, ed. The War of 1812: Past Justifications and Present Interpretations (1963), selections from historians and primary sources
- Updyke, Frank Arthur (1915). The diplomacy of the war of 1812. Johns Hopkins University Press.

=== Treaty of Ghent and aftermath ===
- Burt, A. L. The United States, Great Britain and British North America from the Revolution to the Establishment of Peace after the War of 1812. (1940)
- Engelman, Fred L. The Peace of Christmas Eve (1962), popular account
- Hickey, Donald R. The War of 1812: A Forgotten Conflict (1990) pp. 281–98.
- Perkins, Bradford. Castlereagh and Adams: England and the United States, 1812–1823. (1964), the standard scholarly history
- Remini, Robert Vincent, Henry Clay: Statesman for the Union (1991) pp. 94–122
- Stacey, C. P. (1950). "The Myth of the Unguarded Frontier, 1815–1871". American Historical Review. 56 (1): 1–18. doi:10.2307/1840618. JSTOR 1840618.

=== Social and cultural studies ===
- Eustace, Nicole. 1812: War and the Passions of Patriotism (University of Pennsylvania Press; 2012) 315 pages; examines speeches, tavern songs, political cartoons, etc. in a cultural history of the war and its appeal to the American imagination.
- Graves, Dianne. In the Midst of Alarms: The Untold Story of Women and the War of 1812 (Robin Brass Studio 2012).
- Landers, Jane G. (1999). Black Society in Spanish Florida. Urbana, Illinois: University of Illinois Press. ISBN 025202446X.
- Smith, Gene Allen. The Slaves' Gamble: Choosing Sides in the War of 1812 (Palgrave Macmillan, 2013).
- Taylor, Matthew (2026). Black Redcoats: The Corps of Colonial Marines (second ed.). Barnsley, Yorkshire: Pen and Sword Books. ISBN 978-1-39-903402-9.

== Military operations ==
- Center for Military History. U.S. Army Campaigns of the War of 1812: Online free
  - Barbuto, Richard V. The Canadian Theater 1813. (2013) ISBN 978-0160920844
  - Barbuto, Richard V. The Canadian Theater 1814. (2014) ISBN 978-0160923845
  - Blackmon, Richard D. The Creek War 1813–1814; 43 pp ISBN 978-0160925429
  - Maass, John R. Defending A New Nation 1783–1811 (2013) 59 pp
  - Neimeyer, Charles P. The Chesapeake Campaign, 1813–1814 (2014) ISBN 978-0160925351
  - Rauch, Steven J. The Campaign of 1812 (2013); 58 pp ISBN 978-0160920929
  - Stoltz III, Joseph F. The Gulf Theater, 1813–1815
- Eaton, Joseph H. (2013) [1851]. "Film reel M1832, 1 roll. ARC ID: 1184633.". Returns of Killed and Wounded in Battles or Engagements with Indians and British and Mexican Troops, 1790–1848. Record Group 94: Records of the Adjutant General's Office, 1762-1984. National Archives and Records Administration, Washington D.C.
- Elting, John R. Amateurs, To Arms! A Military History of the War of 1812. 1991. ISBN 0-945575-08-4 (hardcover); ISBN 0-306-80653-3 (1995 Da Capo Press paperback).
- Hickey, Donald. The War of 1812: A Forgotten Conflict. 1989.
- Latimer, Jon, 1812: War with America, Cambridge, MA: Harvard, 2007.
- Quimby, Robert S., The US Army in the War of 1812: an operational and command study (1997)

=== Canada-US border ===
- Clark, Thomas D. (2011) [1963]. "Kentucky In The Northwest Campaign". In Philip P. Mason (ed.). After Tippecanoe: Some Aspects of the War of 1812. Michigan State University Press. pp. 78–98. ISBN 978-1-60917-209-1.
- Ellis, James H. A Ruinous and Unhappy War: New England and the War of 1812 (New York: Algora Publishing, 2009)
- Everest, Allan S. The War of 1812 in the Champlain Valley. Syracuse, N.Y.: Syracuse Univ. Press, 1981.
- Herkalo, Kieth A. The Battles at Plattsburgh: September 11, 1814, The History Press, Charleston, 2012
- Stanley, George F.G. The War of 1812: Land Operations (1983) Macmillan of Canada. ISBN 0-7715-9859-9 Canadian perspective
- Rauch, Steven J. (Spring 2012). "A Stain upon the Nation? A Review of the Detroit Campaign of 1812 in United States Military History". Michigan Historical Review. 38 (1): 129–153. doi:10.5342/michhistrevi.38.1.0129.
- Skaggs, David Curtis (Spring 2012). "Decisions at Sandwich: William Henry Harrison and the Pursuit to the Thames". Michigan Historical Review. 38 (1): 106–128. doi:10.5342/michhistrevi.38.1.0107.
- Smith, Joshua M. Borderland Smuggling: Patriots, Loyalists, and Illicit Trade in the Northeast, 1783–1820" (Gainesville: University Press of Florida, 2006)
- Whitfield, Carol (1974). "The Battle of Queenston Heights". Canadian Historic Sites: Occasional Papers in Archaeology and History (10): 9–59.
- Young, Bennett H. The Battle of the Thames (Louisville, 1903). online from Google
- Zaslow, Morris, ed. (1964). The Defended Border: Upper Canada and the War of 1812. Macmillan of Canada. OCLC 480289.

=== Gulf and New Orleans ===
- Brown, Wilburt S (1969). The Amphibious Campaign for West Florida and Louisiana, 1814–1815. Tuscaloosa: University of Alabama Press. ISBN 0-8173-5100-0.
- Davis, William C. (2019). The Greatest Fury: The Battle of New Orleans and the Rebirth of America. Dutton Caliber, an imprint of Penguin Random House. ISBN 978-0-39-958522-7.
- Millett, Nathaniel (2013). The Maroons of Prospect Bluff and Their Quest for Freedom in the Atlantic World. University Press of Florida. ISBN 978-0-81-304454-5 – via Florida Scholarship online within Oxford University Press.
- Owsley, Frank. Struggle for the Gulf borderlands: the Creek War and the battle of New Orleans 1812–1815 (1981)
- Pickles, Tim New Orleans 1815; Osprey Campaign Series, #28. Osprey Publishing, 1993.
- Reilly, Robin (1974). The British at the gates – the New Orleans campaign in the War of 1812. New York: Putnam. OCLC 839952.
- Remini, Robert V. The Battle of New Orleans: Andrew Jackson and America's First Military Victory. Viking Penguin, 1999. ISBN 0-670-88551-7
- Rowland, Mrs. Dunbar; Andrew Jackson's Campaign against the British, or, the Mississippi Territory in the War of 1812, concerning the Military Operations of the Americans, Creek Indians, British, and Spanish, 1813–1815 (1926)
- Sugden, John (January 1982). "The Southern Indians in the War of 1812: The Closing Phase". Florida Historical Quarterly. 60 (3): 300. JSTOR 30146793.

== Soldiers, sailors and generals ==
- Burroughs, Peter (1979–2016). "Prevost, Sir George". Dictionary of Canadian Biography (online ed.). University of Toronto Press.
- Cleaves, Freeman. Old Tippecanoe: William Henry Harrison and His Time (1990)
- Crawford, Michael J., "U.S. Navy Petty Officers in the Era of the War of 1812," Journal of Military History, 76 (Oct. 2012), 1035–1051.
- Cress, Lawrence. Citizens in arms: The army and the militia in American society to the War of 1812 (1982)
- Elliott, Charles Winslow. Winfield Scott: The Soldier and the Man. 1937
- Greenwood, Adrian (2015). Victoria's Scottish Lion: The Life of Colin Campbell, Lord Clyde. UK: History Press. p. 496. ISBN 978-0-75095-685-7. Archived from the original on 2016-02-21.
- Grodzinski, John R. Defender of Canada: Sir George Prevost and the War of 1812(University of Oklahoma Press; 2013) 360 pages;
- Hitsman, J. M. "Sir George Prevost's conduct of the Canadian War of 1812," Canadian Historical Association Report, 1962: 34–43.
- Johnson, Timothy D. Winfield Scott: The Quest for Military Glory (1998)
- Lamb, W. K. The hero of Upper Canada (Toronto, 1962), on Isaac Brock
- Lewis, Charles Lee (2004). The Romantic Decatur.
  Ayer Publishing, 1937. p. 296. ISBN 0-8369-5898-5. Url
- McCavitt, John, and Christopher T. George. The Man Who Captured Washington: Major General Robert Ross and the War of 1812. (2016). see online review
- Meyer, Leland Winfield. The Life and Times of Colonel Richard M. Johnson (1932)
- Olinger, Mark A., "Organizing for War in Canada, 1812–1814: The U.S. Army Experience," Ontario History 104 (Spring 2012), 21–44.
- Patterson, Benton Rain (2008). The Generals, Andrew Jackson, Sir Edward Pakenham, and the road to New Orleans. New York: New York University Press. ISBN 978-0-8147-6717-7.
- Remini, Robert V. Andrew Jackson and the Course of American Empire, 1767–1821 (1977)
- Riley, Jonathon (2011). A Matter of Honour: The Life, Campaigns and Generalship of Isaac Brock. Midpoint Trade Books. ISBN 978-1896941653.
- Skeen, C. Edward. John Armstrong, Jr., 1758–1843 (1981)
- Skelton, William. "High army leadership in the era of the War of 1812: the making and remaking of the officer corps," William and Mary Quarterly 51 (1994) in JSTOR
- Stacey, C.P. (1983). "Brock, Sir Isaac". In Halpenny, Francess G. (ed.). Dictionary of Canadian Biography. Vol. V (1801–1820) (online ed.). University of Toronto Press.
- Stagg, J. C. A., "United States Army Officers in the War of 1812: A Statistical and Behavioral Portrait," Journal of Military History, 76 (Oct. 2012), 1001–34.
- Stagg, J.C.A. "Enlisted men in the United States Army 1812–1815," William and Mary Quarterly 43 (1986) in JSTOR
- Stagg, J.C.A. "Soldiers in peace and war: comparative perspectives on the recruitment of the United States Army, 1802–1815," William and Mary Quarterly 57 (2000) in JSTOR
- Tucker, Spencer (2004). Stephen Decatur: a life most bold and daring.
  Naval Institute Press, 2004 Annapolis, MD. p. 245. ISBN 1-55750-999-9. Url
- Turner, Wesley B. British Generals in the War of 1812 (2nd ed. 2011) on Sir George Prevost, Isaac Brock, Roger Sheaffe, Baron Francis de Rottenburg, and Gordon Drummond
- Turner, Wesley B. (2011). The Astonishing General: The Life and Legacy of Sir Isaac Brock. Dundurn Press. ISBN 978-1459700079.

=== Primary sources ===
- Bassett, John Spencer, ed. (1926). Correspondence of Andrew Jackson. Vol. I: to April 1814. Washington, D.C.: Carnegie Institution of Washington.
- Bassett, John Spencer, ed. (1969) [1927]. Correspondence of Andrew Jackson. Vol. II: May 1, 1814 to December 31, 1819. Washington, D.C.: Carnegie Institution of Washington. OCLC 1082121859.
- Boklan, Kent D. (October 2008). "How I Broke an Encrypted Diary from the War of 1812". Cryptologia. 32 (4). West Point, New York: United States Military Academy: 299–310. doi:10.1080/01611190802232155. S2CID 32427610. "We study encrypted entries in the diary of a doctor in the War of 1812. Upon decrypting the contents, we find comments of great interest to the early history of the State of Tennessee."
- Brannan, John, ed. (1823). Official letters of the military and naval officers of the United States : during the war with Great Britain in the years 1812, 13, 14, & 15. Washington, D.C.: Way & Gideon. OCLC 1083481275.
- Ritchie, Carson I. A., ed. (1961). "The Louisiana Campaign". The Louisiana Historical Quarterly. Publication of the journal of Major C.R. Forrest, and Dickson's "Journal of Operations in Louisiana, 1814-1815" with commentary. 44. OCLC 1029064475.
- Tupper, F. B. The Life and Correspondence of Major-General Sir Isaac Brock, K. B., 2nd ed. (London, 1847),
- Indexed eLibrary of War of 1812 Resources at Fire Along the Frontier Resource Site
- "Film reel 15, War Office Records, War Department In-Letters and Papers, 1814–1815", Two volumes, Expedition to the Southern coasts of the United States; dispatches, 1814 July - 1815 Mar; papers, 1814, War of 1812 Documents from the British National Archives microfilm, The Historic New Orleans Collection, 2006, WO 1/141 WO 1/142
- "Film reel 16, War Office Records, War Department In-Letters and Papers, 1815–1817", Two volumes, Expedition to the Southern coasts of the United States, 1815; 1815–1817, War of 1812 Documents from the British National Archives microfilm, The Historic New Orleans Collection, 2006, WO 1/143 WO 1/144
- "Film reel 17, War Office Records, Outletters, North America,1814", One volume of the Out-letters of Lord Bathurst, Secretary of State for War and the Colonies, North America, 1814, War of 1812 Documents from the British National Archives microfilm, The Historic New Orleans Collection, 2006, WO 6/2
- "Film reel 18, War Office Records, North America, 1814–1815", [Monthly headcount] returns of [British] regiments serving in the Chesapeake and New Orleans, 1814–1815., War of 1812 Documents from the British National Archives microfilm, The Historic New Orleans Collection, 2006, WO 17/1218, archived from the original on 2021-12-17

== Naval ==
=== Secondary sources ===
- Arthur, Brian How Britain Won the War of 1812: The Royal Navy's Blockades of the United States, 1812–1815 (Boydell Press, 2011) ISBN 1-84383-665-3
- Beirne, Francis F. The War of 1812. New York: Dutton, 1949. 410 pp. (Reprinted 1965 by Shoestring).
- Berube, Claude G. and Rodgaard, John R., A Call to the Sea: Captain Charles Stewart of the USS Constitution. (2005)
- Bird, Harrison. Navies in the Mountains: The Battles on the Waters of Lake Champlain and Lake George, 1609–1814. New York: Oxford Univ. Press, 1962.
- Budiansky, Stephen. Perilous Fight: America's Intrepid War with Britain on the High Seas, 1812–1815 (New York: Vintage, 2012) 448 pp; ISBN 978-0-307-45495-9
- Byron, Gilbert. The War of 1812 on the Chesapeake Bay. Baltimore: Maryland Historical Society, 1964.
- Collins, Mark, et al. The War of 1812 and the Rise of the U.S. Navy (2012) excerpt and text search
- Cranwell, John P., and William B. Crane. Men of Marque: A History of Private Armed Vessels Out of Baltimore During the War of 1812. New York: Norton, 1940.
- Cruikshank, E.A. "The Contest for the Command of Lake Ontario in 1814," Ontario Historical Society Papers and Records, XXI (1924).
- Daughan, George C. 1812: The Navy's War (Basic Books; 2011) 491 pages; U.S. Navy
- Dudley, Wade G. Splintering the Wooden Wall: The British Blockade of the United States, 1812-1815 Annapolis: Naval Institute Press, 2003.
- Dudley, William S. "Commodore Isaac Chauncey and U.S. Joint Operations on Lake Ontario, 1813-14." In New Interpretations in Naval History: Selected Papers From the Eighth Naval History Symposium, edited by William B. Cogar, 139-155. Annapolis: Naval Institute Press, 1989.
- Dudley, William S. "Naval Historians and the War of 1812." Naval History 4 (Spring 1990): 52-57; historiography
- Eckert, Edward K. The Navy Department in the War of 1812. Univ. of Florida Social Sciences Monograph, No. 48. Gainesville: Univ. of Florida Press, 1973.
- Eller, Ernest M., William J. Morgan, and Richard M. Basoco. Sea Power and the Battle of New Orleans. New Orleans: Landmark Society, 1965.
- Everest, Allan S. The War of 1812 in the Champlain Valley. Syracuse, N.Y.: Syracuse Univ. Press, 1981.
- Forester, Cecil S. The Age of Fighting Sail: The Story of the Naval War of 1812. Garden City, N.Y.: Doubleday, 1956.
- Garitee, Jerome R. The Republic's Private Navy: The American Privateering Business as Practiced by Baltimore During the War of 1812. The American Maritime Library, Vol. 8. Middletown, Conn.: Published for Mystic Seaport by Wesleyan Univ. Press, 1977.
- Hickey, Donald R. The War of 1812: A Forgotten Conflict. Urbana: Univ. of Illinois Press, 1989.
- Hitsman, J. Mackay. The Incredible War of 1812: A Military History. Toronto: Univ. of Toronto Press, 1965.
- Lambert, Andrew The Challenge: Britain Against America in the Naval War of 1812 (Faber and Faber, 2012) ISBN 0-571-27319-X
- Lossing, Benson J. Pictorial Field-Book of the War of 1812. New York: Harper, 1868. 1084 pp.
- Mahan, Alfred T. * [https://archive.org/details/seapowerwar181201mahauoft Sea Power in Its Relation to the War of 1812 (2 vols.) (1905) (Boston: Little Brown) American Library Association. (Reprinted 1968 by Greenwood; 1970 by Haskell).
- Mahon, John K. The War of 1812. Gainesville: Univ. of Florida Press, 1972.
- Maloney, Linda M. "The War of 1812: What Role for Sea Power?" In In Peace and War: Interpretations of American Naval History, 1775-1984, 2d ed., edited by Kenneth J. Hagan, 46-62. Westport, Conn.: Greenwood, 1984.
- McCranie, Kevin D. Utmost Gallantry: The U.S. and Royal Navies at Sea in the War of 1812 (Naval Institute Press, 2011) ISBN 1-59114-504-X
- Muller, Charles G. The Darkest Day: 1814; The Washington- Baltimore Campaign. Philadelphia: Lippincott, 1963.
- Poolman, Kenneth. Guns Off Cape Ann: The Story of the Shannon and the Chesapeake. Chicago: Rand McNally, 1962.
- Pullen, Hugh F. The Shannon and the Chesapeake. Toronto: McClelland & Stewart, 1970.
- Roosevelt, Theodore; The Naval War of 1812; G.P. Putnam's Sons; New York, New York; 1882; numerous reprints eText Version at Project Gutenberg.
- Shomette, Donald G. Flotilla: Battle for the Patuxent. Solomons, Md.: Calvert Marine Museum Press, 1981.
- Paullin, Charles Edward (October 1918). The Battle of Lake Erie (a collection of documents, mainly those by Oliver Hazard Perry). Cleveland, Ohio: The Raufin Club.
- Skaggs, David Curtis. "Joint Operations During the Detroit- Lake Erie Campaign, 1813." In New Interpretations in Naval History: Selected Papers From the Eighth Naval History Symposium, edited by William B. Cogar, 121-138. Annapolis: Naval Institute Press, 1989.
- Skaggs, David Curtis; Welsh, William Jeffrey, editors (1991). War on the Great Lakes: Essays Commemorating the 175th Anniversary of the Battle of Lake Erie. Kent State University Press.
- Smith, Gene Allen (2008). "Preventing the "Eggs of Insurrection" from Hatching: The U.S. Navy and Control of the Mississippi River, 1806–1815" (PDF). Northern Mariner. issue Nos. 3-4, (July–October 2008). 18 (3–4). The Canadian Nautical Research Society: 79–91. doi:10.25071/2561-5467.355. S2CID 247349162.
- Stacey, C.P. (2011) [1963]. "Naval Power On The Lakes, 1812–1814". In Philip P. Mason (ed.). After Tippecanoe: Some Aspects of the War of 1812. Michigan State University Press. pp. 49–59. ISBN 978-1-60917-209-1.
- Stacey, C.P. "The Ships of the British Squadron on Lake Ontario, 1812-14," Canadian Historical Review, XXXIV (December, 1953).
- Toll, Ian, Six Frigates: The Epic History of the Founding of the US Navy, New York: W. W. Norton (2006)

=== Primary sources ===
- Dudley, William S., and Michael J. Crawford, eds. The Naval War of 1812: A Documentary History Washington: Naval Historical Center: GPO, 1985-. Vol. 1, 1812; Vol. 2, 1813; Vol. 3, 1814–1815; Vol. 4, 1814–1815. Contains contemporary records from letters, journals, ships' logs, and newspapers from American as well as foreign archives and libraries. The volumes are well illustrated and offer useful bibliographies and extensive indexes.
- Jones, Noah. Journals of Two Cruises Aboard the American Privateer Yankee, by a Wanderer. New York: Macmillan, 1967.
- Paullin, Charles Edward (October 1918). The Battle of Lake Erie (a collection of documents, mainly those by Oliver Hazard Perry). Cleveland, Ohio: The Raufin Club..
- Porter, David. Journal of a Cruise Made to the Pacific Ocean, by Captain David Porter, in the United States Frigate Essex, in the Years 1812, 1813, and 1814. New York: Wiley & Halstead, 1815. 2 vols. (Reprinted 1970 by Gregg).

== Indians ==
- Allen, Robert S. "His Majesty's Indian Allies: Native Peoples, the British Crown, and the War of 1812" in The Michigan Historical Review, 14:2 (Fall 1988), pp. 1–24.
- Antal, Sandy. A Wampum Denied: Procter's War of 1812 (2nd ed. 2011) examines Henry Procter & the Canadian/British/Native perspectives
- Benn, Carl. The Iroquois in the War of 1812. Toronto: University of Toronto Press, 1998. ISBN 0-8020-8145-2
- Calloway, C. Crown and Calumet: British-Indian relations, 1783–1815 (1987)
- Cruikshank, E. A. "The 'Chesapeake' crisis as it affected Upper Canada," Ontario History, 24 (1927): 281–322;
- Cruikshank, E. A. "The employment of Indians in the War of 1812," American Historical Association, Annual report 1895: 319–35
- Edmunds, R. David (1983). "Tecumseh, The Shawnee Prophet, and American History: A Reassessment". Western Historical Quarterly. 14 (3): 261–276. doi:10.2307/969620. JSTOR 969620., argues the Prophet was more important than Tecumseh
- Goltz, Herbert C. W. (1983). "Tecumseh". In Halpenny, Francess G. (ed.). Dictionary of Canadian Biography. Vol. V (1801–1820) (online ed.). University of Toronto Press.
- Horsman, Reginald (June 1958). "British Indian Policy in the Northwest, 1807–1812". Mississippi Valley Historical Review. 45 (1): 51–66. doi:10.2307/1886695. JSTOR 1886695.
- Horseman, Reginald (2011) [1963]. "The Role Of The Indian In The War". In Philip P. Mason (ed.). After Tippecanoe: Some Aspects of the War of 1812. Michigan State University Press. pp. 60–77. ISBN 978-1-60917-209-1.
- Misiak, Zig, "War of 1812: Highlighting Native Nations",2012, ISBN 978-0-9811880-5-8
- Owsley, Frank. Struggle for the Gulf borderlands: the Creek War and the battle of New Orleans 1812–1815 (1981)
- Rugeley, Terry (1989). "Savage and Statesman: Changing Historical Interpretations of Tecumseh". Indiana Magazine of History. 85 (3): 289–311. JSTOR 27791326.
- Stanley, George F. G. "The Indians in the War of 1812," Canadian Historical Review, 31 (June, 1950)
- Sugden, John. Tecumseh: A Life. New York: Holt, 1997. ISBN 0-8050-4138-9, the standard scholarly biography

== Canada ==
- Barbuto, Richard V. The Canadian Theater, 1813. Washington, D.C.: United States Army Center of Military History, 2013.
- Berton, Pierre. The Invasion of Canada. Toronto: McClelland and Stewart, 1980. ISBN 0-316-09216-9.; Flames Across the Border. Toronto: McClelland and Stewart, 1981. ISBN 0-316-09217-7. Popular military history from Canadian perspective
- Carter-Edwards, Dennis. "The War of 1812 Along the Detroit Frontier: A Canadian Perspective", in The Michigan Historical Review, 13:2 (Fall 1987), pp. 25–50.
- Horsman, Reginald. "On to Canada: Manifest Destiny and United States Strategy in the War of 1812" in The Michigan Historical Review, 13:2 (Fall 1987), pp. 1–24.
- Collins, G. Guidebook to the historic sites of the War of 1812 (1998)
- Stagg, J., 'Between Black Rock and a hard place: Peter B. Porter's plan for an American invasion of Canada in 1812,' Journal of the Early Republic 19 (1999)
- Stanley, George F.G. (2011) [1963]. "The Contribution Of The Canadian Militia During The War". In Philip P. Mason (ed.). After Tippecanoe: Some Aspects of the War of 1812. Michigan State University Press. pp. 28–48. ISBN 978-1-60917-209-1.
- Zaslow, Morris, ed. (1964). The Defended Border: Upper Canada and the War of 1812. Macmillan of Canada. OCLC 480289.

== Primary sources ==
- Cruikshank, Ernest Alexander (1854-1939), ed. (1900). The Documentary History of the Campaign upon the Niagara Frontier in the Year 1812. Printed at the Tribune Office. Welland, Ontario: The Lundy's Lane Historical Society. ISBN 0-405-02838-5. OCLC 890783641.
- Cruikshank, Ernest A., ed. Documents relating to the invasion of Canada and the surrender of Detroit, 1812 (1912) reprinted 1971
- Dudley, W., (ed.) The Naval War of 1812: a Documentary History, Washington: Naval Historical Center: GPO 4 vols (1985-)
- Gellner, J. (ed), Recollections of the War of 1812: Three Eyewitnesses' Accounts (1964)
- Graves, D. (ed), Merry hearts make light days: the War of 1812 journal of Lieutenant John Le Couteur, 104th Foot (1993)
- Graves, D. (ed), Soldiers of 1814: American Enlisted Men's Memoirs of the Niagara Campaign (1996)
- Hickey, Donald R., ed. The War of 1812: Writings from America's Second War of Independence (New York: Library of America, 2013). xxx, 892 pp.
- Klinck, C. & Talman, J. (eds), The Journal of Major John Norton, 1816 (1970)
- Wood, W. (ed), Select British Documents of the Canadian War of 1812, 4 vols (1920–28)

== See also ==
- List of bibliographies on American history

== External sources ==
- Six Nations along the Grand River Territory
- President Madison's 1812 War Message, with lesson plans and numerous primary documents from US and Britain regarding the causes of the war
- Dictionary of Canadian Biography, long scholarly articles on all the major figures
- The Naval History & Heritage Command's War of 1812 Website
- The Top 25 Books on the War of 1812 By Donald R. Hickey (September 2007)
- Bibliography of the United States Army during the War of 1812 compiled by the United States Army Center of Military History
- War of 1812 in the Buffalo/Niagara Area: Over 80 books and manuscripts focus on this important region, compiled by the Buffalo History Museum, which has an extensive War of 1812 collection
