= Randor =

Randor may refer to:

== People ==
- Randor Bierd (born 1984), American baseball player
- Randor Guy (born 1937), Indian lawyer and columnist

== Fictional characters ==
- King Randor, a character from the Masters of the Universe franchise.
- Keill Randor, the protagonist of the Last Legionary novels by Douglas Hill.

== See also ==
- Rander, a town in Gujarat, India
