= Gail Robinson =

Gail Robinson may refer to:

- Gail Robinson (Neighbours), a fictional character on the Australian soap opera Neighbours
- Gail Robinson (soprano) (1946–2008), American opera singer
- Gail Robinson (writer), Canadian poet, novelist, and writer for radio
- Gail Robinson (high jumper) (born 1904), American high jumper, runner-up at the 1926 USA Outdoor Track and Field Championships
