= Historiography of the War of 1812 =

The historiography of the War of 1812 reflects the numerous interpretations of the conflict, especially in reference to the war's outcome. The historical record has interpreted both the British and Americans as victors in the conflict, with substantial academic and popular literature published to support each claim. Militarily historians hold the view that the war ended in a draw or stalemate.

The British viewed the War of 1812 as a minor theatre that was overshadowed by key victories at the Battle of Trafalgar in 1805 and the Battle of Waterloo in 1815, leading to the Pax Britannica. In the United States and Upper Canada, nationalistic mythology around the war took hold following its conclusion. (Note: Theodore Roosevelt commented: "Latour is the only trustworthy American contemporary historian of this war, and even he at times absurdly exaggerates the British force and loss, Most of the other American 'histories' of that period were the most preposterously bombastic works that ever saw print. But as regards this battle, none of them are as bad as even such British historians as Alison. ... The devices each author adopts to lessen the seeming force of his side are generally of much the same character. For instance, [at New Orleans] Latour says that 800 of Jackson's men were employed on works at the rear, on guard duty, etc., and deducts them; James, for precisely similar reasons, deducts 553 men. ... Almost all British writers underestimate their own force and enormously magnify that of the Americans.")

With the failure of the invasion of British Canada advancing the concept of Canadian identity, Canada remained a distinct region that would continue to evolve into a nation. Americans were able to enforce their sovereignty, and both the restoration of honor and what has been called the Second War of Independence are important themes in American historiography, and are considered significant results by historians. Indigenous nations are generally held to have lost in the war.

== Popular views ==
Both Americans and Canadians widely believed that their own countries had won the war. Each young country saw its self-perceived victory and settling of the border between them as an important foundation of its growing nationhood. The British, preoccupied with Napoleon's challenge in Europe, paid little attention to what was to them a peripheral and secondary dispute.

One interpretation, especially in Canada, is that of a British or Canadian win and an American defeat. Another leading interpretation, held mainly in the United States, is that of an American win. In a 2012 interview at The Christian Science Monitor, Donald R. Hickey said: "By my count, we lost the War of 1812 and we lost Vietnam. That's not a widely held opinion in the United States about the War of 1812. The common view is that the war ended in a draw." According to Claire Turenne Sjolander, "Canadians are unified (because we participated in our diversity in the war under the British Crown, which is our real heritage) and we are distinct from the United States (because we won, and because we are British)." According to Troy Bickham, the American victory at New Orleans "did not have an impact on the war's outcome", but it shaped "how the Americans received the end of the war by creating the illusion of military victory."

== American views ==
While American popular memory includes the British capture and the August 1814 burning of Washington, which necessitated extensive renovation, it focused on the victories at Baltimore, Plattsburgh, and New Orleans to present the war as a successful effort to assert American national honor, or a Second War of Independence, in which the mighty British Empire was humbled and humiliated. In keeping with this sentiment, there is a popularly held view that Britain had planned to annex Louisiana in 1815. The amoral depravity of the British, in contrast with the wholesome behavior of the Americans, has the "beauty and booty" story at the center of any account of Jackson's victory at New Orleans. (Note: A book on the victory at New Orleans written by a media personality, rather than a historian, went to 5 on the New York Times Hardcover Non-Fiction Bestseller List in 2017, indicating the popularity of the subject retold with a populist and nationalist agenda by Brian Kilmeade. This mirrors a similar publication from a Vietnam War veteran two years previously.) In a speech before the U.S. Congress on 18 February 1815, the then U.S. president James Madison proclaimed the war a complete American victory.

This interpretation of the war was and remains the dominant American view of the war. The American newspaper Niles' Register announced in an editorial on 14 September 1816 that the Americans had crushed the British, declaring "we did virtually dictate the treaty of Ghent to the British." A minority of Americans, mostly associated with the Federalist Party, considered the war a defeat and an act of folly on Madison's part, caustically asking why the British Crown did not cede British North America to the United States if the Americans were dictating the terms of the Treaty of Ghent. The Federalist view of the war is not the mainstream American memory of the war. Congressman George Troup, who said in a speech in 1815 that the Treaty of Ghent was "the glorious termination of the most glorious war ever waged by any people", expressed American popular opinion and memory of the war.

Americans also celebrated the successful American defense of Fort McHenry in September 1814, which inspired the lyrics of what was adopted as the United States national anthem, called The Star-Spangled Banner. Captains of the United States Navy became popular heroes, and commemorative plates were produced with the likenesses of Stephen Decatur, Isaac Hull, and Charles Stewart on them, becoming popular items. Many of these plates were manufactured in England. The navy became a cherished institution, lauded for the victories that it won against all odds. The victory at New Orleans was mythically attributed to militiamen from the Southern states, expertly wielding their rifles, just like their forefathers in the American Revolution. This took hold in popular culture with the song "The Hunters of Kentucky", written about the battle.

After engagements during the final actions of the war, the United States Marines had acquired a reputation as marksmen, especially in ship-to-ship actions.

== Canadian views ==
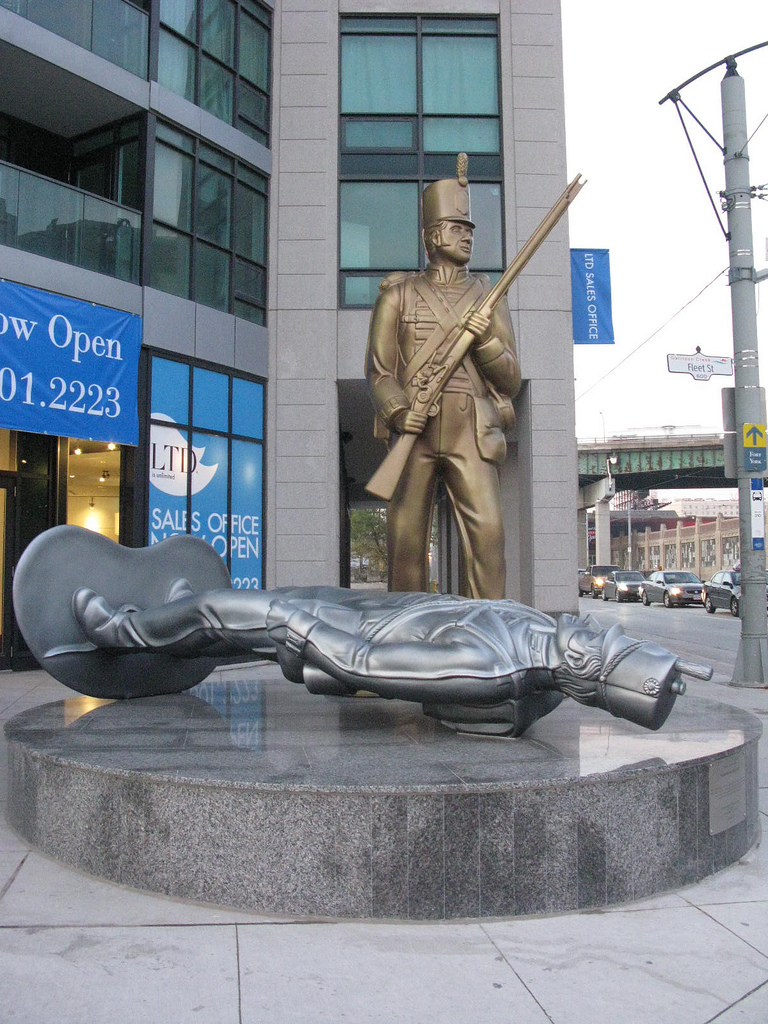
Douglas Coupland's Monument to the War of 1812 (2008) in Toronto depicts a larger-than-life Newfoundland soldier triumphing over an American; both are depicted as metallic toy soldiers of the sort small children play with. (Note: The soldier is standing, painted gold, and dressed as a member of the Royal Newfoundland Regiment Fencible Infantry triumphing over a 16th United States Infantry Regiment.)

In Upper Canada, the War of 1812 was seen by Loyalists as a victory since they had successfully defended their country from an American takeover. A consequence of the Canadian militias' successes was the view, Canada did not need a regular professional army. While Canadian militias had played instrumental roles in several engagements, it was the regular units of the British Army, that ensured the successful defense of Canada.

Several transgressions that took place in Upper Canada by the US Army during the War of 1812 resulted in a "deep prejudice against the United States," to emerge in the colony after the conflict.

By the 21st century, it was a forgotten war in Britain, although still remembered in Canada, especially Ontario. In a 2009 poll, 37 per cent of Canadians said the war was a Canadian victory, nine per cent said the United States won, 15 per cent called it a draw and 39 per cent said they knew too little to comment. A 2012 poll found that in a list of items that could be used to define Canadians' identity, the belief that Canada successfully repelled an American invasion in the War of 1812 places second (25 per cent). A decade after the debate spurred by J. L. Granatstein's 1998 book Who Killed Canadian History? and fears of "cancel culture", the Harper Premiership spent 28 million Canadian Dollars on Bicentenary commemorative events.

== Historians' views ==
Militarily historians hold the view that the war ended in a draw or stalemate, the Treaty of Ghent closing a war that had become militarily inconclusive. Neither side wanted to continue fighting since the main causes had disappeared and since there were no large lost territories for one side or the other to reclaim by force. Historians conclude that all three nations were "the real winners" of the War of 1812. Historians also add that the war could have been avoided in the first place by better diplomacy. The war is seen as a mistake for everyone concerned because it was badly planned and marked by multiple failures on both sides, especially as shown by the repeated American failures to seize parts of Canada and the failed British attack on New Orleans and upstate New York.

Historians disagree on who won the War of 1812 and have debated its outcome for nearly two centuries. While most historians reach the middle position that it was a draw, there are differing and complex interpretations of the war. A survey of school textbooks found that historians emphasize different aspects of the war according to their national narratives, with some British texts scarcely mentioning the war. According to Donald R. Hickey, a popular interpretation is that "everyone was happy with the outcome. Americans were happy because they thought they had won: Canadians were happy because they knew they had won; and the British were happiest of all because they quickly forgot about the war. ... For the British, in other words, the return to status quo ante Bellum as a triumph, for it had demonstrated that they could defeat Napoleonic France in Europe while still fending off U.S. aggression in North America." Historians who believe that both sides won argue that their main objectives were achieved as Britain defeated Napoleon and ruled the seas while the United States affirmed its independence and restored its honor and opened the way to westward expansion. While historians like Wesley Turner held that both sides won, another interpretation held by those like Henry Adams came close to suggesting that both sides lost.

=== British Empire ===
Historians who hold that the war constituted a British victory and an American defeat argue that the British achieved their military objectives in 1812 by stopping the repeated American invasions of Canada and retaining their Canadian colonies. In contrast, the Americans suffered a defeat when their armies failed to achieve their war goal of seizing part or all of Canada. Additionally, they argue the United States lost as it failed to stop impressment which the British refused to repeal until the end of the Napoleonic Wars, arguing that the American actions had no effect on the Orders in Council which were rescinded before the war started. While acknowledging that the war is "usually seen as a draw", Brian Arthur argues that "it was in fact a British victory" because "the British achieved success through an effective commercial maritime blockade which had devastating consequences on the vulnerable, undeveloped US economy." Troy Bickham, author of The Weight of Vengeance: The United States, the British Empire, and the War of 1812, sees the British as having fought to a much stronger position than the United States. (Note: "Even tied down by ongoing wars with Napoleonic France, the British had enough capable officers, well-trained men, and equipment to easily defeat a series of American invasions of Canada. In fact, in the opening salvos of the war, the American forces invading Upper Canada were pushed so far back that they ended up surrendering Michigan Territory. The difference between the two navies was even greater. While the Americans famously (shockingly for contemporaries on both sides of the Atlantic) bested British ships in some one-on-one actions at the war's start, the Royal Navy held supremacy throughout the war, blockading the U.S. coastline and ravaging coastal towns, including Washington, D.C. Yet in late 1814, the British offered surprisingly generous peace terms despite having amassed a large invasion force of veteran troops in Canada, naval supremacy in the Atlantic, an opponent that was effectively bankrupt, and an open secessionist movement in New England.")

According to Carl Benn, "[t]he main objective of keeping Canada had been met as of 1814", while "Americans realized that their own objectives in going to war could not be achieved, and thought the best they could probably get was the preservation of the status quo that they had been fighting so hard to upset." According to Andrew Lambert, "Americans began to rewrite the war as a victory, exploiting the ambiguity of the diplomatic settlement achieved in the Treaty of Ghent on 24 December 1814, a status quo ante compromise that did not reflect the depth of America's defeat." For Jon Latimer, "Britain was content to settle for the 1812 status quo, and that is what Britain got. The United States, in contrast, achieved none of its war aims, and in these terms, the War of 1812 must be seen as a British victory, however marginal." Bickham considers that the British offered the United States generous terms in place of their initially harsh terms, which included massive forfeiture of land to Canada and the Native Americans, because the "reigning Liverpool ministry in Britain held a loose grip on power and feared the war-weary, tax-exhausted public." For Bickham, the war was also technically a British victory "because the United States failed to achieve the aims listed in its declaration of war."

G. M. Trevelyan evaluated the war in negative terms for Britain. He stressed the long-term damage to what has been called the Special Relationship between Britain and the United States, and wrote: "The self-defense of the two Canadas against invasion, and the historical traditions that the infant nation thus acquired were an important result of the war. Otherwise, it had been fought in vain. It solved none of the disputed questions out of which it arose." According to Trevelyan, "the anti-British tradition had obtained a fresh lease of life in the United States, whose orators now had the theme of a second war against Britain as the second romantic period of their national history. The Tory Cabinet cannot be praised for the management of affairs that led to this breach of the peace."

=== United States ===
Historians who believe that it was an American success argue that the main motivation was restoring the nation's honor in the face of relentless British aggression toward American neutral rights on the high seas and in the Western lands. According to Norman K. Risjord, the results in terms of honor satisfied the War Hawks. Donald R. Hickey writes: "Did the cost in blood and treasure justify the U.S. decision to go to war? Most Republicans thought it did. In the beginning, they called the contest a 'second war of independence', and while Britain's maritime practices never truly threatened the Republic's independence, the war did in a broad sense vindicate U.S. sovereignty. But it ended in a draw on the battlefield." Historians argue that it was an American success to end the threat of indigenous nations' raids, kill the British plan for a semi-independent Native American sanctuary, and hereby to open an unimpeded path for westward expansion. (Note: The Princeton Encyclopedia of American Political History writes that "British plans for an American Indian buffer state were dropped, and American Indian nations within U.S. borders lost their last major remaining European diplomatic partner, clearing a path for American westward expansion.") Winston Churchill commented: "The lessons of the war were taken to heart. Anti-American feeling in Great Britain ran high for several years, but the United States was never again refused proper treatment as an independent power." George C. Daughan argues that the United States achieved enough of its war goals to claim a victorious result of the conflict and subsequent impact it had on the negotiations in Ghent. Daughan uses official correspondences from James Madison to the delegates at Ghent strictly prohibiting negotiations with regards to maritime law. (Note: "Madison's latest dispatches [arrived 25–27 July 1814] permitted [the delegates] to simply ignore the entire question of maritime rights. Free trade with liberated Europe had already been restored, and the Admiralty no longer needed impressment to man its warships. The president felt that with Europe at peace the issues of neutral trading rights and impressment could safely be set aside in the interests of obtaining peace. ... Thus, from the start of the negotiations, the disagreements that started the war and sustained it were acknowledged by both parties to be no longer important.")

For Daughan, the British permanently stopped impressing Americans, although they never publicly rescinded the possibility of resuming that practice. The American delegates at the meeting understood it to be a dead issue after the 1814 surrender of Napoleon. In addition, the successful defense of Baltimore, Plattsburgh and Fort Erie (a strategic fortress located in Upper Canada on the Niagara River and occupied during the third and most successful offensive into Canada) had a very favorable influence on the negotiations for the Americans and prompted several famous responses from both sides. Henry Clay wrote to the delegates in October 1814, "for in our own country, my dear sir, at last, must we conquer the peace." With growing pressure in Britain, Arthur Wellesley, 1st Duke of Wellington, when asked to command the forces in the United States, wrote to Robert Jenkinson, 2nd Earl of Liverpool, on 9 November 1814: "I confess that I think you have no right, from the state of the war, to demand any concession of territory from America. ... You have not been able to carry [the war] ... into the enemy's territory, notwithstanding your military success and now undoubted military superiority, and have not even cleared your own territory on the point of attack [at Fort Erie]. ... Why stipulate for uti possidetis?" Daughan argues that the argument the United States failure to capture any Canadian territory influenced the negotiations is an outdated and highly criticized position. He cites the Edinburgh Review, a British newspaper, that had remained silent about the war with the United States for two years, writing that "the British government had embarked on a war of conquest after the American government had dropped its maritime demands, and the British had lost. It was folly to attempt to invade and conquer the United States. To do so would result in the same tragedy as the first war against them, and with the same result."

=== Canada ===
The militia myth of Canadian victory was created by the conservative elites of Upper Canada, such as the Family Compact, long after the war ended. Most people in Upper Canada were late Loyalists, namely economic migrants from the United States, the United Empire Loyalists were not a distinct group, about ten per cent of the Loyalists were former slaves, and most residents did not care who won the war and did not participate in it. The Family Compact disenfranchised most residents of Upper Canada after the war, with the idea of loyalty being used to justify the suppression of dissent. According to historians, such as David Mills, the myth was invented for immigrants who arrived after the end of the Napoleonic Wars. American spelling, which had been standard in the province, was rejected in favor of British spelling, and the local population began to call themselves Canadians. The militia myth of Canada being able to defend itself without a standing army came to be thought of politically as a fact.

=== Indigenous nations ===
Historians generally agree that the real losers of the War of 1812 were the indigenous nations. Tecumseh's Confederacy, which had joined the British side, was defeated and its leader, Tecumseh, killed in battle. Donald R. Hickey wrote: "The big losers in the war were the Indians. As a proportion of their population, they had suffered the heaviest casualties. Worse, they were left without any reliable European allies in North America. ... The crushing defeats at the Thames and Horseshoe Bend left them at the mercy of the Americans, hastening their confinement to reservations and the decline of their traditional way of life."

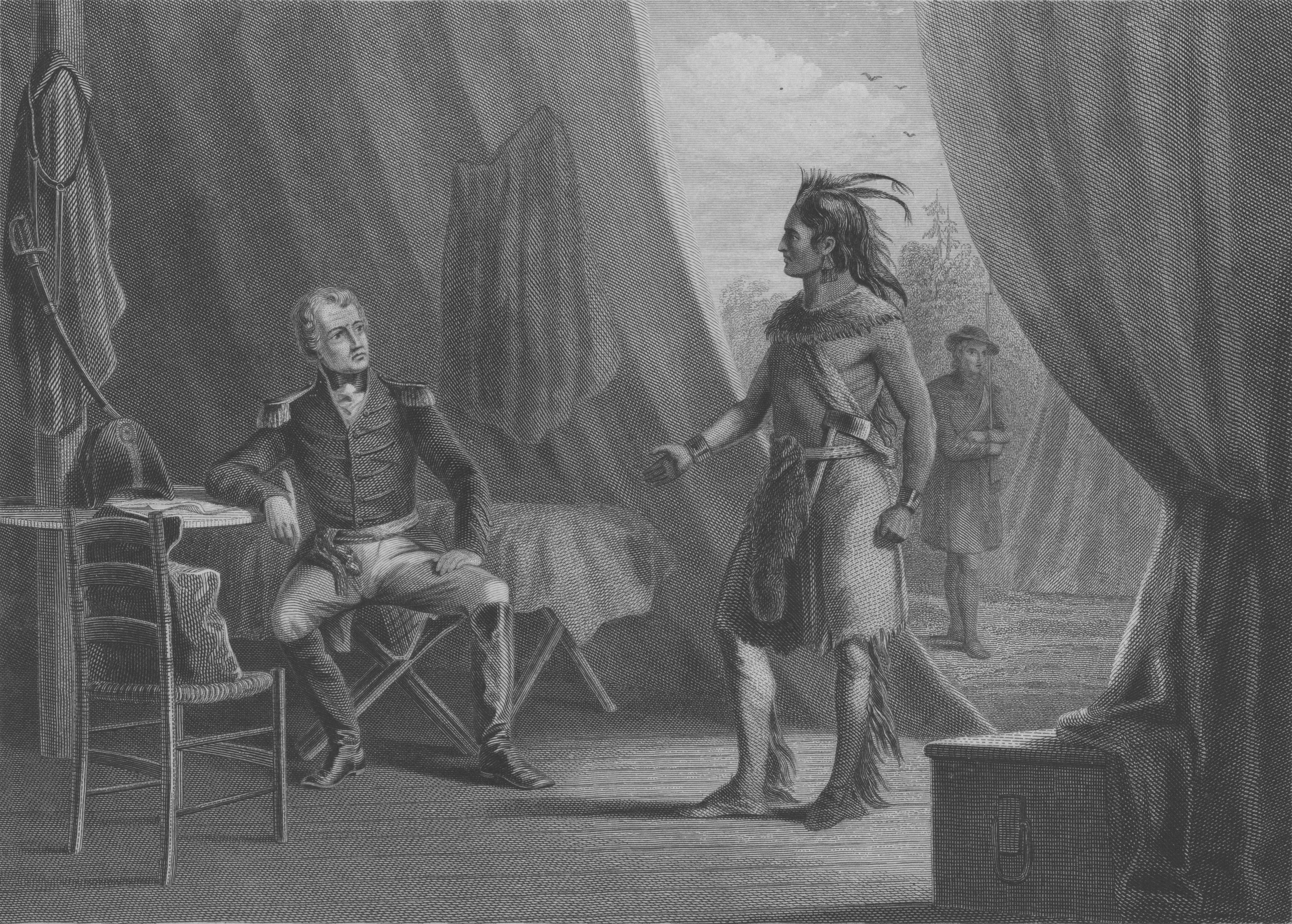
William Weatherford surrendering to Andrew Jackson at the end of the Creek War. The peace imposed on the Creek saw them cede half of their territory to the United States.

The indigenous nations of the Old Northwest (the modern Midwest) had hoped to create an indigenous state as a British protectorate. American settlers into the Midwest had been repeatedly blocked and threatened by indigenous raids before 1812, and that now came to an end. Throughout the war, the British had played on the terror of the Fs and scalping knives of their indigenous allies as it worked especially at William Hull's surrender at Detroit. By 1813, Americans had killed Tecumseh and broken his coalition of tribes. Andrew Jackson then defeated the Creeks in the Southwest. Historian John Sugden says that in both theaters, the indigenous nations' strength had been broken prior to the arrival of the major British forces in 1814. The one campaign that the Americans had decisively won was the campaign in the Old Northwest, which put the British in a weak hand to insist upon an indigenous nations' state in the Old Northwest.

Notwithstanding sympathy and support from commanders, such as Isaac Brock, (Note: Sugden (1982, pp. 301–302) mentions that "Brock had urged the British government to protect his Indian allies in peace negotiations, and by the end of 1812 he had obtained from Earl Bathurst, colonial secretary, a promise to that effect.") Alexander Cochrane and Edward Nicolls, the policymakers in London reneged on this promise as making peace had a higher priority for the politicians. At the peace conference, the British demanded an independent indigenous state in the Midwest. Although the British and their indigenous allies maintained control over the territories in question (i.e. most of the Upper Midwest), British diplomats did not press the demand after an American refusal, effectively abandoning their allies. The withdrawal of British protection gave the Americans a free hand that resulted in the removal of most of the tribes to Indian Territory (present-day Oklahoma). According to historian Alan Taylor, the final victory at New Orleans had in that sense "enduring and massive consequences". It gave the Americans "continental predominance", while it left the indigenous nations dispossessed, powerless, and vulnerable.

The Treaty of Ghent technically required the United States to cease hostilities and "forthwith to restore to such Tribes or Nations respectively all possessions, rights, and privileges which they may have enjoyed, or been entitled to in 1811." The United States ignored this article of the treaty and proceeded to expand into this territory regardless. Meanwhile, Britain was unwilling to provoke a further war to enforce it. A shocked Henry Goulburn, one of the British negotiators at Ghent, remarked: "Till I came here, I had no idea of the fixed determination which there is in the heart of every American to extirpate the Indians and appropriate their territory."

The Creek War came to an end, with the Treaty of Fort Jackson being imposed upon the indigenous nations. About half of the Creek territory was ceded to the United States, with no payment made to the Creeks. This was in theory invalidated by Article 9 of the Treaty of Ghent. The British failed to press the issue and did not take up the indigenous cause as an infringement of an international treaty. Without this support, the indigenous nations' lack of power was apparent and the stage was set for further incursions of territory by the United States in subsequent decades.

== Bibliography ==
- Arthur, Brian (2011). How Britain Won the War of 1812: The Royal Navy's Blockades of the United States. Boydell Press. ISBN 978-1-84383-665-0.
- Benn, Carl (2002). The War of 1812. Oxford: Osprey Publishing. ISBN 978-1-84176-466-5.
- Bickham, Troy (2012). The Weight of Vengeance: The United States, the British Empire, and the War of 1812. Oxford University Press. ISBN 978-0-19-994262-6.
- Bickham, Troy (15 July 2017). "Should we still care about the War of 1812?". OUPblog. Oxford University Press.
- Boswell, Randy (9 December 2009). "Who won War of 1812 baffles poll respondents". Canwest News Service.
- Boswell, Randy (27 November 2011). "Canada Won the war of 1812, US Historian admits". National Post.
- Bowman, John Stewart; Greenblatt, Miriam (2003). War of 1812. Infobase Publishing. ISBN 978-1-4381-0016-6.
- Brands, H. W. (2005). Andrew Jackson: His Life and Times. Random House Digital. ISBN 978-1-4000-3072-9.
- Buckner, Phillip Alfred (2008). Canada and the British Empire. Oxford University Press. pp. 47–48. ISBN 978-0-19-927164-1.
- Carroll, Francis M. (March 1997). "The Passionate Canadians: The Historical Debate about the Eastern Canadian-American Boundary". The New England Quarterly. 70 (1): 83–101. doi:10.2307/366528. JSTOR 366528.
- Churchill, Winston (1958). A History of the English-Speaking Peoples. Vol. 3. ISBN 9780396082750.
- Clark, Connie D.; Hickey, Donald R., eds. (2015). The Routledge Handbook of the War of 1812. Routledge. ISBN 978-1-317-70198-9.
- "CMH: Origins of the Militia Myth". CDN Military. 26 May 2007. Archived from the original on 4 May 2008.
- Coles, Harry L. (2018). The War of 1812. University of Chicago Press. ISBN 978-0-226-22029-1.
- Daughan, George C. (2011). 1812: The Navy's War. New York: Basic Books. ISBN 978-0-465-02046-1.
- "The Defense and Burning of Washington in 1814: Naval Documents of the War of 1812". U.S. Naval History and Heritage Command. Navy Department Library. 16 October 2007. Archived from the original on 2 July 2013.
- Dotinga, Randy; Hickey, Donald R. (8 June 2012). "Why America forgets the War of 1812". The Christian Science Monitor.
- Heidler, David S.; Heidler, Jeanne T. (2002). The War of 1812. Westport; London: Greenwood Press. ISBN 0-313-31687-2.
- Eustace, Nicole (2012). 1812: War and the Passions of Patriotism. Philadelphia: University of Pennsylvania Press. ISBN 978-0-81-220636-4.
- Frentzos, Christos G.; Thompson, Antonio S. (2015). The Routledge Handbook of American Military and Diplomatic History: The Colonial Period to 1877. Routledge. ISBN 978-1-3178-1335-4.
- Hickey, Donald R. (2012). The War of 1812: A Forgotten Conflict, Bicentennial Edition. University of Illinois Press. ISBN 978-0-252-09373-9.
- Hickey, Donald R., ed. (2013). The War of 1812: Writings from America's Second War of Independence. Library of America. New York: Literary Classics of the United States. ISBN 978-1-59853-195-4.
- Hickey, Donald R. (September 2013a). "1812: The Old History and the New". Reviews in American History. 41 (3): 436–444. doi:10.1353/rah.2013.0081. S2CID 144136235.
- Howe, Daniel Walker (2007). What Hath God Wrought. Oxford University Press. ISBN 978-0-19-507894-7.
- Hurt, R. Douglas (2002). The Indian Frontier, 1763-1846. UNM Press. ISBN 978-0-8263-1966-1.
- Ipsos Reid. "Americans (64%) less likely than Canadians (77%) to Believe War of 1812 had Significant Outcomes, Important to formation National Identity, but still more likely to Commemorate War" (PDF). Ipsos Reid. Archived from the original (PDF) on 6 November 2013.
- Kaufman, Erik (1997). "Condemned to Rootlessness: The Loyalist Origins of Canada's Identity Crisis" (PDF). Nationalism and Ethnic Politics. 3 (1): 110–135. doi:10.1080/13537119708428495. S2CID 144562711.
- Kidd, Kenneth (7 January 2012). "The War of 1812, from A to Z". Toronto Star. Archived from the original on 21 July 2015.
- Kessel, William B.; Wooster, Robert (2005). Encyclopedia of Native American Wars and Warfare. Infobase Publishing. ISBN 978-0-8160-3337-9.
- Kohler, Douglas (2013). "Teaching the War of 1812: Curriculum, Strategies, and Resources". New York History. 94 (3–4). Fenimore Art Museum: 307–318. JSTOR newyorkhist.94.3-4.307.
- Lambert, Andrew (2012). The Challenge: Britain Against America in the Naval War of 1812. Faber and Faber.
- Lambert, Andrew (2016). "Creating Cultural Difference: The Military Political and Cultural Legacy of the Anglo-American War of 1812". In Forrest, Alan; Hagemann, Karen; Rowe, Michael (eds.). War, Demobilization and Memory: The Legacy of War in the Era of Atlantic Revolutions. Springer. ISBN 978-1-137-40649-1.
- Latimer, Jon (2007). 1812: War with America. Cambridge: Belknap Press. ISBN 978-0-674-02584-4.
- Mills, Dudley (1921). "The Duke of Wellington and the Peace Negotiations at Ghent in 1814" (PDF). Canadian Historical Review. 2 (1): 19–32. doi:10.3138/CHR-02-01-02. S2CID 161278429.
- Mills, David (1988). Idea of Loyalty in Upper Canada, 1784–1850. McGill-Queen's Press. ISBN 978-0-7735-6174-8.
- Mowat, C. L. (1965). "A Study of Bias in British and American History Textbooks". Bulletin. 10 (31). British Association For American Studies: 35.
- Edwards, Rebecca; Kazin, Michael; Rothman, Adam, eds. (2009). The Princeton Encyclopedia of American Political History. Princeton University Press. ISBN 978-1-4008-3356-6.
- Risjord, Norman K. (1961). "1812: Conservatives, War Hawks, and the Nation's Honor". William and Mary Quarterly. 18 (2): 196–210. doi:10.2307/1918543. JSTOR 1918543.
- Roosevelt, Theodore (1900). The Naval War of 1812. Vol. II. Annapolis: Naval Institute Press.
- Rutland, Robert Allen (1994). James Madison and the American Nation, 1751-1836: An Encyclopedia. Simon & Schuster. ISBN 978-0-13-508425-0.
- Simmons, Edwin H. (2003). The United States Marines: A History (4th ed.). Annapolis, Maryland: Naval Institute Press. ISBN 1-59114-790-5.
- Sjolander, Claire Turenne (2014). "Through the Looking Glass: Canadian Identity and the War of 1812". International Journal. 69 (2): 152–167. doi:10.1177/0020702014527892. JSTOR 24709498. S2CID 145286750.
- Smelser, M. (March 1969). "Tecumseh, Harrison, and the War of 1812". Indiana Magazine of History. 65 (1). Indiana University Press: 25–44. JSTOR 27789557.
- "Star-Spangled Banner". Smithsonian.
- Stoltz, Joseph F. (2017). A Bloodless Victory: The Battle of New Orleans in History and Memory. Baltimore: Johns Hopkins University Press, 2017. ISBN 978-1-42-142302-9.
- Sugden, John (January 1982). "The Southern Indians in the War of 1812: The Closing Phase". Florida Historical Quarterly. 60 (3): 273–312. JSTOR 30146793.
- Sugden, John (1990). Tecumseh's Last Stand. University of Oklahoma Press. ISBN 978-0-8061-2242-7.
- Swanson, Neil H. (1945). The Perilous Fight: Being a Little Known and Much Abused Chapter of Our National History in Our Second War of Independence. Recounted Mainly from Contemporary Records. Farrar and Rinehart.
- Taylor, Alan (2010). The Civil War of 1812: American Citizens, British Subjects, Irish Rebels, & Indian Allies. Knopf Doubleday Publishing Group. ISBN 978-1-4000-4265-4.
- Taylor, Matthew (16 June 2026). "Black Redcoats by Matthew Taylor - PhD by Prior Publication". Kingston upon Thames, UK – via Kingston University.
- Thompson, John Herd; Randall, Stephen J. (2008). Canada and the United States: Ambivalent Allies. University of Georgia Press. ISBN 978-0-8203-3113-3.
- Toll, Ian W. (2006). Six Frigates: The Epic History of the Founding of the U.S. Navy. New York: W. W. Norton. ISBN 978-0-393-05847-5.
- Trautsch, Jasper M. (December 2014). "Review of Whose War of 1812? Competing Memories of the Anglo-American Conflict". Reviews in History. doi:10.14296/RiH/issn.1749.8155. hdl:11603/19192. ISSN 1749-8155. Archived from the original on 5 September 2015.
- "The Treaty of Ghent". War of 1812. PBS. Archived from the original on 5 July 2017.
- Trevelyan, G. M. (1901). British History in the Nineteenth Century (1782–1919).
- Turner, Wesley B. (2000). The War of 1812: The War That Both Sides Won. Toronto: Dundurn Press. ISBN 978-1-55002-336-7.
- "War of 1812 Overview". USS Constitution Museum. 17 August 2019.
- Waselkov, Gregory A. (2009) [2006]. A Conquering Spirit: Fort Mims and the Redstick War of 1813–1814 (illustrated ed.). University of Alabama Press. ISBN 978-0-8173-5573-9.
