= Warlocks and Warriors (Mayflower) =

1971 anthology of fantasy short stories edited by Douglas Hill

- Cover illustration of the first edition.
- Editor: Douglas Hill
- Cover artist: Josh Kirby
- Language: English
- Genre: Fantasy
- Publisher: Mayflower
- Publication date: 1971
- Publication place: United Kingdom
- Media type: Print (Paperback)
- Pages: 159

Warlocks and Warriors is an anthology of fantasy short stories edited by Canadian author and editor Douglas Hill. It was first published in paperback by Mayflower in 1971.

== Summary ==
The volume has an overall introduction by Hill.

== Contents ==
- "Introduction" (Douglas Hill)
- "The Sleeping Sorceress" (an Elric of Melniboné story by Michael Moorcock)
- "The Curse of the Monolith" (a story by Lin Carter and L. Sprague de Camp based on the Robert E. Howard's Conan)
- "The Ogyr of the Snows" (Martin Hillman) (a pseudonym of Douglas Hill)
- "The Wager Lost by Winning" (John Brunner)
- "The Wreck of the Kissing Bitch" (Keith Roberts) (set in the world of Moorcock's novel The Ice Schoner)
- "The Unholy Grail" (Fritz Leiber, a Gray Mouser story)
