= Guerrillas and Generals =

Book by Paul H. Lewis

- Author: Paul H. Lewis
- Language: English
- Genre: Non-fiction
- Publication place: United States

Guerrillas and Generals is a book written by American Paul H. Lewis. Its subject is the history of Argentina from the 1970s to some years ago. It talks about the Dirty War in Argentina and the trials of Jorge Rafael Videla and other military rulers of Argentina.

== Reception ==
Donald C. Hodges of Florida State University, reviewing the book in Political Science Quarterly, claims that Lewis holds a bias against the guerrillas. He notes, however, that except for the omission of Abraham Guillén the book is a "well documented study".

Ruth Stanley of the Free University of Berlin, in a review of the book for the Journal of Third World Studies, claims that Lewis "appears to believe that guerrilleros who were tortured and disappeared got what they deserved". The review concludes by opining that

[T]his is a work based on published materials that provides no new insights, fails to engage with theoretical debates and offers no analysis of the underlying causes of repression. The author's reliance on anecdote and questionable sources make it unsuitable as an introductory work.
