= Richter 10 =

1996 novel by Arthur C. Clarke

- Author: Arthur C. Clarke and Mike McQuay
- Cover artist: Splash
- Language: English
- Genre: Science fiction
- Publisher: Gollancz
- Publication place: United Kingdom
- English publication date: 1996
- Media type: Print (Paperback)
- Pages: 446
- ISBN: 0-575-60110-8
- OCLC: 35017847

Richter 10 is a 1996 science fiction novel by Arthur C. Clarke and Mike McQuay. The protagonist, Lewis Crane, develops a hatred of earthquakes after his parents are killed and his home destroyed by one when he is seven years old. He devises a way of predicting earthquakes months or years in advance, and eventually banishing them forever by stopping all tectonic activity. The book's title is a reference to the Richter scale, on which 10 was considered (when the scale was devised) to be the most power an earthquake was likely to ever have.

== Plot summary ==
Late in the 20th century an earthquake in California has left seven-year-old Lewis Crane a crippled, homeless orphan. This drives Crane to become the world's foremost earthquake expert, a Nobel laureate, ruthless scientist, and an entrepreneur dedicated to relieving the misery of those affected by earthquakes. He is also the moving force behind Foundation, an organization dedicated to furthering scientific research on earthquakes. Foundation has perfected the technology to accurately and precisely predict the future location, intensity, and time of occurrence, to within minutes, of future earthquakes. Crane's first prediction is that most of Sado island in Japan will be destroyed, as will the inhabited village of Aikawa. Local authorities ignore his warnings and vilify him. Crane's predictions come true just after the mayor of Aikawa arrives with police to arrest and deport him.

Crane's model then predicts that a major quake will hit areas around the Mississippi River. A cartel of cynical businessmen and politicians decides to use the prediction to further their interests in the upcoming presidential election. They tweak the Foundation's field data to skew the predicted date to months earlier. When no quake occurs on that date, the cartel's candidate wins the election and Lewis loses credibility. Foundation discovers the data falsification and, running the process with genuine data, reveals that the quake is still due in a few months. Crane and the Foundation try to warn the public but federal authorities try to silence them. The quake hits as predicted, and Lewis emerges a hero and a prophet.

Later, Crane devises a bold plan to banish earthquakes forever by directing the force of nuclear bombs deep inside the Earth downward to "spot weld" 50 strategic places between the tectonic plates forming Earth's crust, thus stopping their movement. Naysayers raise the objections that the detonation of nuclear bombs is dangerous and that stopping all Earth's tectonic activity will bring unforeseen consequences. Crane then reveals that decades in the future a quake with a magnitude of 10 on the Richter scale will split much of California from the North American continent, making it an island in the Pacific with massive losses of life and property. The first of the 50-odd "spot welds," done at a certain location in the Western US and within a certain time window, will avert this disaster. Lewis convinces the government of the event and a secret project akin to the Manhattan Project is undertaken for the first "spot weld." Just before the bombs are to be detonated, terrorists attack and destroy the project's facility. Lewis' wife and child are killed. The book ends in the mid-twenty-first century with Lewis pouring his consciousness into a neural network before committing suicide by remaining in the quake zone when it finally hits. In the epilogue, he is resurrected as a conscious hologram teaching students on a lunar colony.

== Reception ==
Gideon Kibblewhite reviewed Richter 10 for Arcane magazine, rating it a 3 out of 10 overall. Kibblewhite comments that "The words 'well trodden' and 'ground' spring to mind. Yes. The characters are very poor, too. It will still be a blockbuster, though, even if the earth didn't move for me."

== Reviews ==
- Review by Gary K. Wolfe (1996) in Locus, #422 March 1996
- Review by Stephen Baxter (1996) in Interzone, #106 April 1996
- Review by Don D'Ammassa (1996) in Science Fiction Chronicle, #189 May/June 1996
- Review by uncredited (1996) in The Magazine of Fantasy & Science Fiction, June 1996
- Review by L. J. Hurst (1996) in Vector 188
- Review by Andy Mills (1997) in Vector 192
- Review [German] by Wolfgang Both (1999) in Alien Contact, Nummer 35
