= Douglas Hill =

Canadian science fiction author, editor and reviewer

- Born: 6 April 1935
- Died: June 21, 2007 (aged 72)
- Occupation: Author
- Genre: Children's Literature

Douglas Arthur Hill (6 April 1935 – 21 June 2007) was a Canadian science fiction author, editor and reviewer. He was born in Brandon, Manitoba, the son of a railroad engineer, and was raised in Prince Albert, Saskatchewan. An avid science fiction reader from an early age, he studied English at the University of Saskatchewan (where he earned an Honours B.A. in 1957) and at the University of Toronto. He married fellow writer and U of S alumna Gail Robinson in 1958; they moved to Britain in 1959, where he worked as a freelance writer and editor for Aldus Books. In 1967–1968, he served as assistant editor of the controversial New Worlds science fiction magazine under Michael Moorcock.

A lifetime leftist, he served from 1971 to 1984 as the Literary Editor of the socialist weekly Tribune (a position once held by George Orwell), where he regularly reviewed science fiction despite the continued refusal of the literary world to take it seriously. Before starting to write fiction in 1978, he wrote many books on history, science and folklore. Using the pseudonym Martin Hillman, he also worked as an editor of several anthologies, among them Window on the Future (1966), The Shape of Sex to Come (1978), Out of Time (1984), and Hidden Turnings (1988). He is probably best known for his The Last Legionary quintet of novels, supposedly produced as the result of a challenge by a publisher to Hill's complaints about the lack of good science fiction for younger readers.

Hill and his wife had one child, a son. They were divorced in 1978. He lived in Wood Green, London, and died in London after being struck by a bus at a zebra crossing. His death occurred one day after he completed his last trilogy, the Demon Stalkers.

== Writing science-fiction/fantasy for children ==
His most well-known series for younger children appears to have been The Last Legionary quintet. Starting with Galactic Warlord the quartet (the fifth book was a prequel anthology) told the story of Keill Randor, last survivor of a murdered world, seeking revenge for the genocide, aided by a secretive group of advisers known as The Overseers and a winged, telepathic alien named Glr. The series contained the tropes of 'well-intentioned' Science perverted by ego and over-confidence into evil, and the 'good' science being used as the servant not master of humanity. The series also had the trope that elderly people are not irrelevant and worthless, but the smartest, wisest people around and the ones who really know what is going on.

Both The Huntsman and Colsec trilogies continued the tropes and themes of youth alienation caused by being disenfranchised, not lumping all aliens [foreigners] together, mismanagement of natural resources by the industrial military complex, and how disparate individuals can work together and find common ground for the greater good. Hill also explored these ideas in writing fantasy as well as science-fiction series, first in Poisoner and then Demon Stalkers.

His books were popular in schools as their straightforward action and sci-fi or sword-and-sorcery themes appealed to impatient or inattentive readers, particularly boys, who were increasingly difficult to engage in 'reading for pleasure and leisure' and above all they were relatively short-length books without a great deal of background waffle. Whilst still at school and having become a volunteer 'pupil librarian', one writer and tutor was tasked with encouraging her teenage male peers to borrow more books from the school library and take up reading as a recreational activity and recommending books that would facilitate this from potential new stock; she found through peer reviews, questionnaires and a mini-poll that, 'alongside the contemporary, competitive sports-based stories of authors such as Michael Hardcastle and the humorous stories of such as Dick King-Smith, the other of the 'big three' for boys was Douglas Hill. They liked the fast pace, the paring away of extraneous words and the compact length of the books, as well as that although each novel was a complete story, it existed within a 'universe' that enabled them to not have to learn a whole set of new characters each time.'

Another advantage to sustain the increased reading interest of boys was that Hill produced his novels fairly quickly—he had five books published between 1980 and 1982, which meant the engaged interest of young readers was kept as there was another title ready when they finished a previous one.

== Writing science-fiction/fantasy for adults ==
In the early 1990s, he decided to develop a fantasy trilogy for adult readers; published in 1994 The Lightless Dome has the main protagonist of Jared 'Red' Cordell, who finds himself transported from contemporary 1990s Earth to a planet where sorcery and Mediaeval style knights and kingdoms exist – he finds that he is apparently descended from or possibly the genetic Doppelganger of a legendary warrior, Red Corodel, who mysteriously disappeared centuries before and who is viewed as the only hope of thwarting a power-crazed sorcerer intent on achieving global tyranny through Apotheosis – becoming a god. Again the series examines the concept of an individual's ideals of personal integrity and community responsibility and at what point does altruism become destructive rather than constructive, and also the issues of spin and media manipulation as initially, he enjoys being in his own 'Conan the Barbarian' movie and plays on the perks of being mistaken for Red Corodel returned to save the day.

A sequel The Leafless Forest was published in 1994; however, the last part to the trilogy The Limitless Bridge was not released and remains unavailable.

== Bibliography ==
=== Series ===
==== Last Legionary ====
1. Galactic Warlord (1979)
2. Deathwing Over Veynaa (1980)
3. Day of the Starwind (1980)
4. Planet of the Warlord (1981)
5. Young Legionary (1982)

Young Legionary is chronologically the first in the series.

==== Demon Stalkers ====
1. Prey (2008)
2. Torment (2008)
3. Vengeance (2009)

Prey is chronologically the first in the series.

==== Huntsman ====
1. The Huntsman (1982), ISBN 0-434-94284-7
2. Warriors of the Wasteland (1983), ISBN 0-434-94283-9
3. Alien Citadel (1984), ISBN 0-434-94282-0

==== Colsec ====
1. Exiles of Colsec (1984), ISBN 0-575-03348-7
2. The Caves of Klydor (1984), ISBN 0-575-03413-0
3. Colsec Rebellion (1985), ISBN 0-575-03610-9

==== Poisoner ====
1. Blade of the Poisoner (1987), ISBN 0-575-03954-X
2. Master of Fiends (1987), ISBN 0-575-04095-5

==== Del Curb, Cosmic Courier ====
1. The Fraxilly Fracas (1989), ISBN 0-575-04403-9
2. The Colloghi Conspiracy (1990), ISBN 0-575-04579-5

==== Apotheosis ====
1. The Lightless Dome (1993), ISBN 0-330-32770-4
2. The Leafless Forest (1994), ISBN 0-330-32960-X
3. The Limitless Bridge (1996), ISBN 0-330-33842-0 [ISBN allocated, never commercially published]

==== Cade ====
1. Galaxy's Edge (1996), ISBN 0-553-50334-0
2. The Moons of Lannamur (1996), ISBN 0-553-50330-8
3. The Phantom Planet (1997), ISBN 0-553-50331-6

=== Other novels ===
- The Exploits of Hercules (1978), ISBN 0-330-25448-0
- The Illustrated Faerie Queene (1980), ISBN 0-88225-297-6
- Have Your Own Extraterrestrial Adventure (1983), ISBN 0-09-930700-6
- The Moon Monsters (1984), ISBN 0-434-93024-5
- How Jennifer (and Speckle) Saved the Earth (1986), ISBN 0-434-93036-9
- Goblin Party (1988), ISBN 0-575-04338-5
- Penelope's Pendant (1990), ISBN 0-333-51318-5
- The Tale of Trellie the Troog (1991), ISBN 0-563-34781-3
- The Unicorn Dream (1992), ISBN 0-434-97674-1
- The Voyage of MudJack (1993), ISBN 0-416-18819-2
- Penelope's Protest (1994), ISBN 0-330-32727-5
- World of the Stiks (1994), ISBN 0-553-40655-8
- Penelope's Peril (1994), ISBN 0-330-33302-X
- The Magical Tree-castle (1995), ISBN 0-434-96727-0
- Malcolm and the Cloud-Stealer (1995), ISBN 0-590-55917-6
- Fireball and the Hero (1995), ISBN 0-416-19123-1
- The Dragon Charmer (1997), ISBN 0-340-68741-X
- Space Girls Don't Cry (1998), ISBN 0-7497-3244-X
- Alien Deeps (2000), ISBN 1-902260-55-4
- Melleron's Monsters (2000), ISBN 0-19-919270-7
- Melleron's Magic (2001), ISBN 0-19-919271-5
- Monster Maze (2001), ISBN 1-84299-006-3
- Star Dragon (2002), ISBN 1-84299-046-2

=== Plays ===
- Window on the Future (1966)

=== Edited anthologies ===
- Window on the Future (1966)
- Way of the Werewolf (1966)
- The Devil His Due (1967)
- Warlocks and Warriors (1971)
- The Shape of Sex to Come (1978), ISBN 0-330-25091-4
- Alien Worlds (1980), ISBN 0-434-94285-5
- Planetfall (1986), ISBN 0-19-278113-8

=== Non-fiction ===
- The Supernatural (1965)
- The Opening of the Canadian West (1967)
- Magic and Superstition (1968)
- John Keats (1968), ISBN 0-249-43968-9
- Regency London (1969), ISBN 0-356-02568-3
- A Hundred Years of Georgian London (1970), ISBN 0-356-03264-7
- Return from the Dead (1970), ISBN 0-356-03463-1
- Fortune Telling (1972), ISBN 0-600-32835-X
- The Scots to Canada (1972), ISBN 0-85614-016-3
- The English to New England (1975), ISBN 0-85614-021-X
- Tribune 40 (1977)
- Bridging a Continent (1981, as "Martin Hillman")
- Witch and Wizard (1997), ISBN 0-7513-6106-2

=== Anthologies containing stories by Douglas Hill ===
- Hidden Turnings (1989), ISBN 0-416-11272-2, ed. Diana Wynne Jones
- Space Stories (1996), ISBN 1-85487-451-9, ed. Mike Ashley

=== Short stories ===
- "Hally's Paradise" (1984)
- "True Believer" (1989)

=== Plays ===
- Roulette

== See also ==
- The Last Legionary series
