= Mike McQuay =

American novelist (1949–1995)

- Born: Michael Dennis McQuay; 3 June 1949; Baltimore, Maryland, United States
- Died: 27 May 1995 (aged 45); Oklahoma City, Oklahoma, United States
- Occupation: Novelist
- Writing career
- Pen name: Jack Arnett, Don Pendleton
- Genre: Science fiction

Michael Dennis McQuay (3 June 1949 – 27 May 1995) was an American science fiction writer. His series include Mathew Swain, Ramon and Morgan, Executioner, and SuperBolan. The Book of Justice series he wrote as Jack Arnett. His non-series novel Memories was nominated for a Philip K. Dick Award in 1987.

McQuay taught creative writing at the University of Central Oklahoma for more than ten years, and died of a heart attack at 45.

== Mathew Swain novel series ==
- Hot Time In Old Town (1981)
- When Trouble Beckons (1981)
- The Deadliest Show In Town (1982)
- The Odds Are Murder (1983)

== Ramon and Morgan series ==
- Pure Blood (1985)
- Mother Earth (1985)

== Executioner series (as Don Pendleton) ==
- Death Has A Name (1986)
- Code Of Dishonor (1987)
- American Nightmare (1987)
- Killing Urge (1988)

== Mack Bolan series (as Don Pendleton) ==
- Fire in the Sky (1988)
- Tooth and Claw (1996)
- Day of the Vulture (1997)

== Book of Justice series (as Jack Arnett) ==
- Genocide Express (1989)
- Zaitech Sting (1990)
- Death Force (1990)
- Panama Dead (1990)

== Non-series novels ==
- Life-Keeper (1980)
- Escape from New York (1981)
- State of Siege (1984)
- Jitterbug (1984)
- My Science Project (1985)
- The MIA Ransom (1986)
- Memories (1987)
- Isaac Asimov's Robot City: Suspicion (1987)
- The Nexus (1988)
- Pixel (1988)
- Puppetmaster (1991)
- Richter 10 (1996) (with Arthur C. Clarke)
