= Paul H. Lewis =

Paul H. Lewis is professor emeritus and former Chair of Political Science at Tulane University. Lewis completed a BA at the University of Florida and a PhD at UNC Chapel Hill. In 1991, he helped organize the Louisiana chapter of the National Association of Scholars.

The books he wrote include:

- The Politics of Exile (1968)
- Paraguay under Stroessner (1980)
- Socialism, Liberalism, and Dictatorship in Paraguay (1982)
- The Crisis of Argentine Capitalism (1990)
- Latin Fascist Elites, The Mussolini, Franco and Salazar Regimes (2003);
- Guerrillas and Generals
- The Agony of Argentine Capitalism: From Menem to the Kirchners
- Authoritarian Regimes in Latin America: Dictators, Despots, and Tyrants.
