= Lifekeeper =

Novel

First edition (publ. Avon Books)

Lifekeeper is a novel by Mike McQuay published in 1980.

== Plot summary ==
Lifekeeper is a novel in which the world is controlled by warring military dictatorships.

== Reception ==
Greg Costikyan reviewed Lifekeeper in Ares Magazine #5 and commented that "McQuay should have taken Brunner's advice to would-be writers: first write a novel; then throw it out; then write another novel. Your second might be readable."

== Reviews ==
- Review by B. A. Clark and Carol Haldeman (1981) in Shadows of ... Science Fiction and Fantasy Magazine, #4 February 1981
- Review by Nigel E. Richardson (1985) in Paperback Inferno, #55
- Review by Carol McGeehon (1985) in Fantasy Review, August 1985
