= Donald R. Hickey =

Professor of history at Wayne State College

- Born: 1944 (age 81–82); Illinois, U.S.
- Education: University of Illinois Urbana-Champaign (BA, MA, PhD)
- Occupation: Historian

Donald R. Hickey (born 1944) is an American academic who is professor of history at Wayne State College, author and lecturer on early American history, mostly involving the War of 1812. He has been with Wayne State since 1978 while simultaneously acting as visiting professor at the Army Staff College (1991–1992), the Naval War College (1995–1996), and The Citadel (2013). Hickey has written many articles for numerous historical journals and magazines, and has served on the editorial and advisory boards of several. During his academic career, Hickey has earned a number of awards for his scholarship and literary efforts.

== Early life and education ==
Hickey was born in Illinois in 1944. He earned his B.A., M.A. and Ph.D. in history at the University of Illinois, located in Urbana-Champaign.

== Career ==
Hickey is an expert concerning the War of 1812 and was acclaimed to be "the dean of 1812 scholarship" by The New Yorker magazine; he wrote eight books on the War of 1812, along with numerous articles on the same subject in the Journal of the War of 1812, War of 1812 Magazine, Journal of American History and William and Mary Quarterly. Hickey's 1989 work, War of 1812, the Forgotten Conflict, has been referred to as "the definitive study" on that war, and one which has "dominated the American interpretation of the War of 1812 to date." His works on the War of 1812 have been referenced in books and journals by other contemporary historians. (Note: Definitive examples include works by, Trautsch, 2013, McCavitt & George, 2016, Stewart, 2016, Latimer, 2007, Stagg, 2012, Gilge, 2013, and others.) Hickey has been noted for gathering hitherto scattered information concerning battlefield casualties in his work, Don't Give up the Ship.

From 1978 to 1986 Hickey was the editor of A Journal of the History and Culture of the Missouri Valley. Since 2007 he has served as press editor at Johns Hopkins University Press. In 1991/92 he was a member of the advisory board at the Military Review. In 1993 to 1997 he was a member of the editorial board at the Journal of the Early Republic. Since 2002 he has been a member of the board of advisors at the Journal of the War of 1812. Since 2006 Hickey has been a War of 1812 Magazine editorial board member.

Hickey has authored eleven books and over a hundred journal articles, mostly involving the War of 1812. He has lectured across the United States, Canada, and the British Isles. He often worked and consulted with several governmental agencies and museums.

In his definitive work, War of 1812, the Forgotten Conflict, Hickey challenges the contemporary consensus for the necessity of the war. His focus is on maritime issues rather than westward expansion in the north west theater. In scholarly reviews of this work, Hickey is said to be sympathetic to the Federalists who opposed the war, while he tends to fault President James Madison, questions his ability to lead, and harbors a measure of hostility towards the Republicans for promoting a war he feels was not necessary at that time.

== Honors and awards ==
Hickey has earned various awards for his historical scholarship efforts.

- Best Book Award in 1990 for his work, The War of 1812: A Forgotten Conflict, from the American Military Institute's
- National Historical Society Book Prize, 1990 for The War of 1812: A Forgotten Conflict.
- Burlington Northern Award, 1991 for outstanding teaching
- Commander's Award, 1992–1993, for Public Service, U.S. Army Command and General Staff College
- Pi Gamma Mu, Outstanding Faculty Member award
- Burlington Northern Award, 1993 for outstanding scholarship
- Maryland Preservation Award, 2013, Excellence in Media & Publications award
- Spirit of 1812 Award, 2013, from the National Society United States Daughters of 1812
- Samuel Eliot Morison Award, 2013, from the USS Constitution Museum
- Nebraska 150 Books honor, 2017, for his work, Nebraska Moments
- NEH Research Fellowship for College Teachers, 1988.
- The History Book Club selected his work, War of 1812: A Forgotten Conflict, for book club edition.
- Speaker at the 1987 meeting of the American Historical Association.

== Publications ==
- Hickey, Donald R. (1989). The War of 1812: A Forgotten Conflict. Urbana; Chicago: University of Illinois Press. ISBN 0-252-01613-0.
- —— (2006). Don't Give Up the Ship! Myths of The War of 1812. Urbana: University of Illinois Press. ISBN 978-0-252-03179-3.
- —— (2012). The War of 1812, A Short History. University of Illinois Press. ISBN 978-0-252-09447-7.
- —— (2012). 187 Things You Should Know about the War of 1812. Maryland Center for History and Culture. ISBN 978-0-9842-1352-8.
- —— (2012). The War of 1812: A Forgotten Conflict, Bicentennial Edition. Urbana: University of Illinois Press. ISBN 978-0-252-07837-8.
- —— (2013). The War of 1812: Writings from America's Second War of Independence. Library of America.
- —— (2013). The War of 1812: Writings from America's Second War of Independence. Library of America. New York: Literary Classics of the United States. ISBN 978-1-59853-195-4.
- —— (2015). Glorious Victory, Andrew Jackson and the Battle of New Orleans. Johns Hopkins University Press. ISBN 9781421417059.
- —— (2021). Tecumseh's War: The Epic Conflict for the Heart of America. Georgetown University Press. ISBN 978-1-6471-2006-1.

Journals

- Hickey, Donald R.; Hatzenbuehler, Ronald L. (November 1976). "Communications". Pacific Historical Review. 45 (4). University of California Press: 65–88. doi:10.2307/3638130. JSTOR 3638130.
- —— (December 1977). "New England's Defense Problem and the Genesis of the Hartford Convention". The New England Quarterly. 50 (4). The New England Quarterly, Inc.: 587–604. doi:10.2307/364248. JSTOR 364248.
- —— (1978). "Federalist Party Unity and the War of 1812". Journal of American Studies. 12 (1): 23–39. doi:10.1017/S0021875800006162. S2CID 144907975.
- —— (March 1979). "The Federalists and the Coming of the War, 1811-1812". Indiana Magazine of History. 75 (1). Indiana University Press: 70–88. JSTOR 27790356.
- —— (December 1981). "American Trade Restrictions during the War of 1812". The Journal of American History. 68 (3). Oxford University Press: 517–538. doi:10.2307/1901937. JSTOR 1901937.
- —— (Winter 1989). "America's Response to the Slave Revolt in Haiti, 1791-1806". Journal of the Early Republic. 2 (4). University of Pennsylvania Press on behalf of the Society for Historians of the Early American Republic: 361–379. doi:10.2307/3123088. JSTOR 3123088.
- —— (Winter 1989). "The Monroe-Pinkney Treaty of 1806: A Reappraisal". The William and Mary Quarterly. 2 (4). Omohundro Institute of Early American History and Culture: 65–88. doi:10.2307/1939719. JSTOR 1939719.
- —— (2001). "The War of 1812: Still a Forgotten Conflict?". The Journal of Military History. 65 (3): 741–769. doi:10.2307/2677533. JSTOR 2677533.

== See also ==
- Bibliography of the War of 1812

== Bibliography ==
- "Don Hickey". Wayne State College.
- "Donald R. Hickey". University of Nebraska, Illinois.
- Blythe, Patrick (2021). "Blythe on Hickey, 'The War of 1812: A Forgotten Conflict, Bicentennial Edition'". Michigan State University Department of History.
- Cress, Lawrence Delbert (April 1991). "The War of 1812: A Forgotten Conflict". Pennsylvania Magazine of History and Biography. 115 (2): 269.
- Gilge, Paul A. (2013). Free Trade and Sailors' Rights in the War of 1812. Cambridge University Press. ISBN 978-1-1070-2508-0.
- Doutrich, Paul E.; Hickey, Donald R. (July 1991). "Reviewed Work: The War of 1812: A Forgotten Conflict". Pennsylvania History: A Journal of Mid-Atlantic Studies. 58 (3). Penn State University Press. JSTOR 27773471.
- Hickey, Donald R. (2012). The War of 1812: A Forgotten Conflict. University of Illinois Press. ISBN 978-0-2520-7837-8. JSTOR 10.5406/j.ctt3fh41c.
- Hickey, Donald R. (1989). The War of 1812: A Forgotten Conflict. University of Illinois Press. ISBN 978-0-2520-6059-5.
- Hickey, Donald R. (2006). Don't Give Up the Ship!. University of Illinois Press. ISBN 9780252031793.
- Egerton, Douglas R. (March 1991). "Reviewed Work: The War of 1812: A Forgotten Conflict, by Donald R. Hickey". The Journal of American History. 77 (4). Oxford University Press: 1351–1352. doi:10.2307/2078304. JSTOR 2078304.
- Stewart, David O. (2016). Madison's Gift: Five Partnerships That Built America. Simon & Schuster. ISBN 978-1-4516-8858-0.
- Latimer, Jon (2007). 1812: War with America. Cambridge: Belknap Press. ISBN 978-0-674-02584-4.
- McCavitt, John; George, Christopher T (2016). The Man Who Captured Washington: Major General Robert Ross and the War of 1812. University of Oklahoma Press. ISBN 978-0-8061-5530-2.
- Stagg, J. C. A. (2012). The War of 1812. Cambridge University Press. ISBN 978-0-521-898201.
- Trautsch, Jasper M. (January 2013). "The Causes of the War of 1812: 200 Years of Debate" (PDF). The Journal of Military History. 77 (1): 273–293.
- "Hickey, Donald R. 1944–". encyclopedia.com.
