= Cristina Nemerovschi =

Romanian writer

- Cristina Nemerovschi
- Born: May 10, 1980 (age 46); Bucharest
- Occupation: Writer
- Writing career
- Notable awards: Tiuk!

Cristina Nemerovschi (born May 10, 1980, in Bucharest) is a Romanian writer. Her works include over fifteen novels and a non-fiction book. She has won various awards, including the 2010 TIUK (Talented Italians in UK) "Book of the Year" award for her debut novel. She subsequently published at least 15 novels and a non-fiction book. Her works have received critical analyses.

== Biography ==
Cristina Nemerovschi was born May 10, 1980 in Bucharest, Romania. She earned earned a bachelor's degree and master's degree from the Faculty of Philosophy University of Bucharest. Her debut novel Sânge satanic was published in 2010 and was awarded the 2010 TIUK (Talented Italians in UK) "Book of the Year".

== Works ==
Nemerovschi's works include over fifteen novels and a non-fiction book.

Novels

- "Sânge satanic" – Book series
  - "Sânge satanic"/ "Satanic Blood" (Herg Benet, 2010, 2011, 2013)
  - "Ani cu alcool și sex" / "Years with alcohol and sex" (Herg Benet, 2012, 2014)
  - "Rezervația unicornilor" / "Unicorn Rezervation" (Herg Benet, 2014)
- Cronicile fetei lup Series
  - "Ceața" / "The fog" (Herg Benet, 2029)
- "Pervertirea" / "The Perverting" (Herg Benet, 2012, 2013, 2014)
- "Nymphette_dark99" (Herg Benet, Cărțile Arven, 2013, 2013, 2015)
- "Cum a ars-o Anghelescu o lună ca scriitor de succes" / "How Anghelescu pretended to be a successful writer for a month" (Herg Benet, 2014)
- "Păpușile" / "The Dolls" (Herg Benet, 2014)
- "Vicky, nu Victoria" / "Vicky, not Victoria" (Herg Benet, 2015)
- "Rockstar" (Herg Benet, 2016)
- "Zilele noastre care nu vor mai fi niciodată" / "Our days that will never be again" (Herg Benet, 2016)
- "Dresoarea" (Herg Benet, 2017)
- "Răzvrătiții" (Herg Benet, 2019)

Non-Fiction

- "Ce facem cu România? Cititorii în dialog cu Cristina Nemerovschi" / "What are we doing with Romania? Open dialogs with the readers" (Herg Benet, 2013)

Anthologies

- "Alertă de gradul zero în proza scurtă românească actuală" / "A grade zero alert in the contemporary Romanian short prose" (Herg Benet, 2011, coord. Igor Ursenco)
- "În week-end nu ești niciodată singur" in "Zombii: cartea morților vii" / "Zombie: the living dead book" (Ed. Millennium Books, 2013, coord. Mircea Pricăjan)
- "Cu fața la perete" / "Face at the wall" (Ed. Brumar 2013, coord. Bogdan Munteanu și Marius Aldea)
- "Best Of Mistery and Horror" (Herg Benet, Cărțile Arven, 2014, coord. Mircea Pricăjan)
- "Cele mai frumoase proze ale anului" / "The most beautiful prose of the year" (Ed. Adenium, 2014, coord. Alexandru Petria)

Books published under the pen name Anna Vary

- "Ultima vrăjitoare din Transilvania – vol. I: Contesa Aneke" / "The last witch of Transylvania – Volume I: Countess Aneke" (Herg Benet, Cărțile Arven, 2012)
- "Ultima vrăjitoare din Transilvania – vol. II: Mathias" / "The last witch of Transylvania – Volume II: Mathias" (Herg Benet, Cărțile Arven, 2013)
- "Ultima vrăjitoare din Transilvania – vol. III: Alexandra" / "The last witch of Transylvania – Volume III: Alexandra" (Herg Benet, Cărțile Arven, 2015)

Undergoing projects

- "Răzvrătitții"

== Prizes and distinctions ==
Nemerovschi received the TIUK (Talented Italians in UK) 2010 "Book of the Year" award for Sânge satanic. It was also a 2011 "Book of the Year" finalist in the Premiers Romans En Lecture. The author was also nominated for "Young Writers Gala - The best prose writer of 2014". Nemerovschi won a special prize from Athenaeum Magazine at the National Short Prose Contest Radu Rosetti.

- "Tiuk!" Prize for debut
- "Sânge satanic" / "Satanic Blood" – finalist at the Premiers Romans En Lecture (25th edition)
- Nominated for the Young Prose Writer of the Year Award 2014 and Young Writers Gala
- The special prize of "Athenaeum Magazine" at the National Short Prose Contest "Radu Rosetti", 12th edition, in 2010

== Critical references ==
Nemerovschi has received of praise for her works and has been referred to as a "phenomenal writer", "the rebel of today's literature", and "a revelation" by Romanian literary magazines.

- Cristina Nemerovschi - profil de autor
- Cristina Nemerovschi
- "Cartea care va zdruncina preconcepţii şi va crea dependenţă" – Cristina Nemerovschi
- Cristina Nemerovschi – o revelație a literaturii din ultimii ani
- Cristina Nemerovschi: Am primit ameninţări cu moartea pentru un subiect la Bacalaureat
- "Interzis proștilor", Mihail Vakulovski, Revista Timpul
- "Zeii și păduchiuții", Felix Nicolau, Ziarul Financiar
- "O premieră în literatura noastră", Radu Voinescu, Cafeneaua literară
- "De ce Cristina Nemerovschi", Revista Arte și meserii, decembrie 2011
- "Păpușile, Cristina Nemerovschi", Constantin Piștea
- "O Lolită românească?", Revista Tribuna, nr. 261, 16–31 iulie 2013
- "Excelent scris, fără clișee și timpi morți", Doina Ruști, Revista Luceafărul
- "Nemerovschi, unicornii și nemurirea"
- "De ce o au maneliștii micuță?", Felix Nicolau, Agenția de carte
- "Drumul către cea mai frumoasă ființă de pe pământ", Societate și cultură
- "Un bildungsroman autohton", Revista Tiuk!
- "Un autor român pe care mama ta n-ar trebui să-l citească", Anca Zaharia, Hyperliteratura
- Ana Barton, "Romanul care spulberă prejudecăți", Cariere online
- "Trei cavaleri ai Apocalipsei", Ștefan Bolea, Revista EgoPHobia
- "De partea cealaltă a geamului", Revista EgoPHobia
- "Cum iubesc păpușile", Stelian Țurlea, Ziarul Financiar – Ziarul de Duminică
- "Primul roman metalist din literature română", Ștefana Atodiresei, Alt Iași
- "Căderi proiectate", Luiza Mitu, Revista Sisif
- "Ani cu alcool și sex", Mihail Vakulovski, Tiuk!
- "O insultă binevenită la adresa ipocriziei", Hyperliteratura
- "Rezervația unicornilor", Semne Bune
- "O carte provocare și provocatoare", Mihail Gălățanu, Revista Top Brands, martie-aprilie 2015-06-13
- "Schizofrenie literară de mare efect", Oana Dușmănescu, BookMag
- "O simfonie întunecată", Marius Miheț, Revista Familia
- "Vrea și poate să schimbe lumea", Semne Bune
- "Watch your holes!", Revista Corpul T, nr. 3, 2012
- "Gigi Anghelescu, scriitoril haotic agățat de nemărginirea literaturii", Cristina Gelep, Revista Mozaicul, nr. 3-4 (197–198), 2015, p. 17
- "O satiră a lumii literare românești", Alexandru Petria, Revista Tribuna, nr. 287
- "Scriitorul vs. cititorii lui", Hyperliteratura
- "Rebelă cu o cauză"
- "Păpușile de Cristina Nemerovschi", Revista Arte și Meserii, Oana Andreea Răcaru
- "Autostopista de la miezul nopții", Stelian Țurlea, Ziarul Financiar
- "Ani cu alcool și sex", Mircea Pricăjan, Revista Familia, nr. 10 (587), octombrie 2014
