= The Ragged Edge of Science =

1980 book by Lyon Sprague de Camp

- Dust-jacket cover.
- Author: L. Sprague de Camp
- Illustrator: Don Simpson
- Cover artist: Don Simpson
- Language: English
- Subject: Pseudo-science
- Publisher: Owlswick Press
- Publication date: 1980
- Publication place: United States
- Media type: Print (Hardback)
- Pages: x, 244
- ISBN: 0-913896-06-3
- OCLC: 7522462

The Ragged Edge of Science is a science book by L. Sprague de Camp, illustrated by Don Simpson. It was first published by Owlswick Press in 1980.

The book is a collection of twenty-two articles (two of them book reviews) on various curiosities and wonders exploring the boundaries between science and pseudo-science. "The[ir] common thread is [their] skeptical takes on subjects that are often muddled by paranormal and pseudoscientific claims." De Camp viewed such phenomena from a skeptically rational viewpoint, pointing out the fallacies in supernatural and otherwise fantastic explanations. His debunking efforts were an important and characteristic feature of his nonfiction, and the present collection is a notable instance of it.

The book's constituent articles were originally published in a variety of science magazines, science fiction magazines, and other publications from 1950 to 1976.

== Contents ==
  - "Preface"
- Long Ago and Far Away
  - "The Mayan Elephants" (from Astounding Science Fiction, v. 45, no. 4, Jun. 1950)
  - "Faery Lands Forlorn" (from Science Fiction Stories, v. 6, no. 3, Nov. 1955 and v. 6, no. 5, Mar. 1956)
  - "The Pyramids of Kush" (from Science Digest, v. 63, no. 4, Apr. 1968)
  - "The Falls of Troy" (from The Magazine of Fantasy & Science Fiction, v. 38, no. 3, Mar. 1970)
  - "The Quarter-Acre Round Table" (from The Magazine of Fantasy & Science Fiction, v. 39, no. 1, Jul. 1970)
  - "The Tower of Mystery" (from Science Digest, v. 68, no. 4, Oct. 1970)
  - "The Street of the Dead: Teotihuacan" (from Science Digest, v. 68, no. 6, Dec. 1970)
  - "Tula and the Vanished Toltecs" (from Science Digest, v. 71, no. 4, Apr. 1972)
- Round About the Cauldron
  - "The Mystic Trance" (from Future Combined with Science Fiction Stories, v. 2, no. 4, Nov. 1951)
  - "The Mountain of Light" (from Science Fiction Quarterly, v. 1, no. 6, Aug. 1952)
  - "The Great Charlatans" (from Science Fiction Quarterly, v. 2, no. 2, Feb. 1953)
  - "A Modern Merlin" (from Dynamic Science Fiction, Jun. 1953)
  - "The Mysterious Kabbalah" (from Fate, No. 79, Oct. 1956)
  - "Bridey Murphy and the Martian Princess" (from Science Fiction Stories, v. 7, no. 4, Jan. 1957)
  - "The Great Satanist Plot" (from Exploring the Unknown, no. 20, Jun. 1953)
  - "So You Want to Be a Prophet?" (from the Philadelphia Sunday Bulletin, Feb. 20, 1966)
- Science and Pseudo-Science
  - "Worlds in Collision" (book review) (from Astounding Science Fiction, v. 45, no. 2, Apr. 1950)
  - "The So-called Fourth Dimension" (from Future Combined with Science Fiction Stories, v. 2, no. 3, Sep. 1951)
  - "How to Talk Futurian" (from The Magazine of Fantasy & Science Fiction, v. 13, no. 4, Oct. 1957)
  - "The Great Pseudomath" (from Fantastic Universe, v. 8, no. 6, Dec. 1957)
  - "The Decline and Fall of Adam" (from The Magazine of Fantasy & Science Fiction, v. 45, no. 5, Nov. 1973)
  - "Chariots of the Gods?" (book review) (from Amra, v. 2, no. 65, Apr. 1976)

== Synopsis ==
The essays in the book fall into three general categories, dealing with ancient civilizations and certain unscientific theories regarding them, occult-related subjects, and pseudoscience in general. Anecdotes from history and de Camp's travels to some of the locales he writes about pepper the narrative.

The first eight chapters fall into the first category. Discussions of Bronze Age Troy and the ancient Sudanese civilization of Kush counter romantic speculations with a resume of what is known of them from historical sources and archaeological investigations. In contrast, the section on King Arthur, of whom little factual information has been established, puts to rest unverified notions regarding him by tracing the development and elaboration of his legend down through the ages. The chapter on the Maya debunks diffusionist theories seeking the origin of their culture in Old World civilizations rather than from indigenous factors. Later sections about Teotihuacan and the Toltecs serve more as general introductions to these cultures. There is also a brief discussion of the Tour Magne, a Roman ruin in Nîmes, France, and a chapter on myths that discounts them as reliable reportage of prehistoric events.

Chapters in the second category include discussions of memories of previous lives supposedly recovered via hypnosis, the Kabbalah, lives of famous charlatans claiming to have been magicians, such as Cagliostro and Aleister Crowley, the hoax perpetrated by Léo Taxil and others that purported to expose Freemasonry as devil worship, theosophist C. W. Leadbeater, the development of occultist cultism around Mount Shasta in Northern California (demonstrated to have a literary basis), and the origins of the mystic trance, with rational explanations for the visions experienced. A satirical chapter of advice on how to set one's self up as a prophet rounds out the section.

An account of the early history of Fundamentalist movement to prohibit the teaching of evolution in schools leads off the third category. There is also a biography of Populist politician Ignatius Donnelly focusing on his speculations regarding Atlantis and like matters, and then a speculative chapter regarding future languages, essentially a didactic piece on language change with application to science fictional treatments of time-travel. It leads into a discussion of nonscientific claims about the "fourth dimension" in general. This part of the book also includes reviews of Immanuel Velikovsky's Worlds in Collision and Erich von Däniken's Chariots of the Gods?, both of which de Camp discounts.

== Reception ==
Critical reviews of the book were generally positive. Writing in the wake of its release, Tom Easton observed in Analog Science Fiction/Science Fact that "[i]f you know L. Sprague de Camp's work at all, you know what to expect ... He's always readable and entertaining, as he sticks his thumbs into gaping holes of fact and logic ... He's full of the straight dope (though he often doesn't go into things as deeply as I would like)." He urged readers to "buy the book." Michael Schuyler, writing for Library Journal, took a more neutral stance, judging only that "[m]ost of these mysteries have been well documented elsewhere, and De Camp [sic] presents no revelations." The book was also reviewed by Darrell Schweitzer in Science Fiction Review v. 10, issue 1 (Spring, 1981), p. 22.

More recently, an exhaustive review from 2007 sums up the book as "a very pleasant and readable collection of essays, an excellent and classical example of skeptical writing and debunkery of various kinds of pseudoscientific and paranormal nonsense." The reviewer notes de Camp's "accessible, down-to-earth style," humor, and story-telling expertise, as well as "somewhat conservative opinions ... which occasionally show in his writing." Its conclusion is "[o]verall I highly recommend this book."
