= The Invasion of Canada =

Book by Pierre Berton

The Invasion of Canada: 1812–1813
- Author: Pierre Berton
- Language: English
- Genre: Non-fiction
- Publication date: 1980

The Invasion of Canada: 1812–1813 is a 1980 book by Pierre Berton.

== The book and its sequel ==
The book is an account of the first year of the War of 1812 and the events leading up to it. Berton wrote that this history is neither military nor political. "This is, rather, a social history of the war, the first to be written by a Canadian." Details of the book were drawn from memoirs and diaries of common soldiers and commanding officers, as well as official military correspondence.

The story of the war, to its conclusion, was continued in the follow-up book, Flames Across the Border: The Canadian-American Tragedy, 1813–1814 (1981).

== See also ==
- Family Compact
