= Last Legionary =

Science fiction series by Douglas Hill

The Last Legionary series is a series of five books written by Canadian author Douglas Hill. The books are Young Legionary, Galactic Warlord, Deathwing Over Veynaa, Day of the Starwind and Planet of the Warlord. The series has been described as a simplified version of E. E. Smith's Lensman series.

The books tell of the adventures of Keill Randor, the last survivor of his planet, whose inhabitants are annihilated at the beginning of the book Galactic Warlord. Randor's people were hardened over generations by their inhospitable planet, which (combined with rigorous combat and martial arts training) resulted in them exhibiting speed, reflexes, strength, and fighting abilities all at the very upper limit of human ability and Randor himself is one of the most skilled amongst them, twice winner of the planetwide martial arts contest, a feat bettered by only one other legionary in the history of the contest. The people of Moros acted effectively as mercenaries; however, they also have a strict moral code, and only offer their services to clients fighting in self-defence. After they are all killed by a mysterious villain known only as the Warlord, Randor vows to avenge them.

== Plot ==
=== Young Legionary (1982) ===
A prequel written after the other books in the series, Young Legionary follows Keill Randor through his childhood, from the age of 12 to 18 (within four distinct stories), as he struggles to meet the requirements of becoming a Legionary. The novel also introduces his close friend, Oni Wolda. Each story reinforces the concept that Keill is a highly competent Legionary, and his only shortcoming is his lack of experience.

=== Galactic Warlord (1979) ===
As the book begins, Keill is the leader of an off-world Strike Team. Far from home his task force receives a distress signal from their home planet Moros, stating that they are under attack from unknown forces. Keill's ship has suffered damage, and he is unable to immediately return. When he arrives, the entire planet is covered with an unknown type of radiation. He is met by Oni's ship, and she tells him to flee the planet; a deadly radiation is killing everyone who comes close to the surface. It is an automated message: Oni herself is dead, having been exposed on Moros. In grief Keill leaves the planet's orbit. He soon realizes that even at the extreme range he has been exposed to the radiation and is slowly dying.

Keill begins to search for any fellow Legionnaires who may have survived, relying on his extreme physical conditioning and iron will to fight the course of the disease. His search is fruitless, and it appears he truly is the last Legionary. As Keill begins to lose hope, he is contacted by an unknown agency seeking a meeting, but he ignores the contact to pursue some rumours of apparent survivors on a nearby moon. Shortly afterwards, he is gassed inside his ship and rendered unconscious.

Keill wakes as an apparent prisoner, immobilized within what appears to be a medical facility. His extreme physical conditioning allows him to recover quickly, and he discovers that he has been completely healed of his radiation sickness by a strange group known only as The Overseers. This group has a network of satellites that give an overview of all events throughout the galaxy. The Overseers' leader, Talis, explain to Keill that his home planet was destroyed by a malevolent entity known as 'The Warlord' whose sole aim is to spread war through the galaxy, enabling him to rule over the remains that survive. The Warlord moved against the Legions since he perceived them as the greatest threat to his plan. The Overseers also explain that since the radiation sickness had settled into his bones, they were forced to replace his entire skeleton using a new alloy—effectively rendering Keill's bones unbreakable. They also reveal how they captured Keill so easily—a telepathic avian life form from another galaxy known only as Glr.

With Glr as his companion, a sceptical Keill moves to meet with the Legionaries he found evidence of. He quickly finds that they are in fact agents of a shadowy force known as the Deathwing, and that everything the Overseers told him was true. With the help of Glr, and his prodigious abilities, Keill manages to defeat them; in doing so he takes on their leader from the Altered Worlds, (Planets where radiation and the environment have created mutations amongst the inhabitants,) Thr'un, a giant of a man who can grow plates of leathery armour from within his body. After eventually killing him, a wounded Keill then agrees to collaborate with his new friends to find and destroy the Warlord.

=== Deathwing Over Veynaa (1980) ===
Keill is sent to a planetoid by the Overseers, to determine if their recent turn to aggression has its roots in the Warlord's influence. Known as "The Cluster" it is the only source of a highly effective broad-spectrum antibiotic "Ossidin", and the colonists are attempting to secede from the home planet Veynaa. The Overseers are also concerned that the medicine may come under the control of the Warlord. Glr stays with his ship while Keill lands on the planet posing as an out of work mercenary. He befriends council members Shalet and Quern, freighter pilot Joss, and makes an enemy of an enforcer Groll. It transpires that Quern is from the Altered Worlds, and a very powerful short-range telepath, though Glr is able to shield Keill's mind from Quern's probing. Keill suspects that Quern and Groll are Deathwing agents, which is confirmed when Quern announces possession of a doomsday device that will destroy Veynaa. A test-firing of the weapon on a nearby moon shows it to be the same weapon that wiped out the Legionaries on Moros. As tensions escalate Shalet becomes disillusioned with the rebellion, and suspicious of Quern. When Quern imprisons Keill and orders the radiation bomb launched she turns against him and releases Keill, who fights his way to the freighter intending to either prevent liftoff or destroy it. On the way he encounters Groll and Quern, killing Groll, but surrendering his weapon when Quern threatens Glr. Quern takes Keill prisoner, and gloats that he has already killed Glr, but Keill realises he is mistaken after finding that his mind is still shielded from Querns telepathic probing. Glr's alien mind deceived Quern, and after telepathically shocking him, he is killed by Keill.

Keill makes it to the freighter and explains to Joss the nature of the weapon, but is trapped by a mining robot controlled by her - she is the second Deathwing agent, and intends to destroy both planet and Keill, claiming all the credit to "The One" - the leader of the Deathwing. Using his unbreakable bones to advantage Keill damages the robot (which then attacks Joss in error,) and escapes from it and the ship, programming it for overlight before he leaves. Glr reminds him that when it exits overlight the radiation bomb will still be a hazard to any nearby planets, but Keill replies that he did not program the ship to leave overlight.

Reading news reports later, Keill notes that peace has returned to both Veynaa and the Cluster with both sides claiming victory, but the Cluster gaining much better trade agreements from Veynaa, and a measure of independence after all.

=== Day of the Starwind (1980) ===
Keill and Glr are sent by the Overseers to investigate the planet Jitrell, which has been plagued by a series of violent crimes, carried out by highly trained combatants. His investigations take him to a nearby planet Rilyn which is periodically orbited by the moon Qualthorn, also known as "The Intruder", and the close proximity of the moon causes planet-wide storms, called the Starwind, strong enough to destroy and flatten anything on the surface - all native life is subterranean. Glr is uncomfortable on the planet - the starwind when it arrives will kill her, but she is unable to stay under cover as being an avian species she has a fear of being underground. Together they find a tall tower, many storeys high protected by an energy field which nullifies all energy sources - including weapons and vehicle power sources. He also comes into contact with a poorly trained group of Jitrellian militia, also sent to investigate the planet. Obliged by his moral code he assists them, however they are all killed - except for their leader Tam - by a group of the combatants Keill has been searching for. Keill recognises the faces of several soldiers and as there are duplicate faces comes to the conclusion that they are clones of long-dead legionaries. The strike team are eager to try their skills against a real Legionary, but when given the chance, Keill defeats them and makes his way into the tower. He meets their leader, a golden cyborg calling himself Altern, who explains that the cloning process has been going on for many years, that the forcefield will easily withstand the Starwind, and even offers Keill a place in "The legions of Rilyn" - as Keill has now killed the previous Strike Team Leader.

Refusing the offer, Altern fights Keill revealing that he is also "The One", the most dangerous Deathwing agent, and also its leader, his golden body overwhelming Keill with brute strength, and only Keill's unbreakable bones and training allow him to survive. An oversight on Altern's part allows Keill to pick up a blaster, and he shoots Altern directly through the chest.

Keill rescues Tam, and disables the tower's forcefield making his way to the top of the tower where Glr will pick him up, despite the ever-increasing strength of the Starwind. At the top of the tower he encounters Altern again, who is not permanently bonded to the golden armour as a cyborg, but merely as an exoskeleton. Altern escapes and Keill himself is nearly killed by the Starwind as the tower collapses, but Glr arrives in his own craft just in time.

Keill and Tam return to Jitrell as heroes. During his capture Tam had theorised that the New Legion were a group of space pirates setting up base on Rilyn, and Keill sees no reason to change this story. After the Starwind has passed no trace of the tower remains, and only a few clones are discovered to have survived, but they are killed while trying to escape.

Keill decides to leave the planet and surmises that it is time he began his hunt for The One again.

=== Planet of the Warlord (1981) ===
Keill has been unable to track any more Deathwing agents, so decides to offer himself as a target to them instead. He has entered the Battle Rites of Banthei, the most famous fighting contest in the galaxy. He is the first person in 80 years to enter it unarmed, and his progress through the early rounds of the contest has made him famous throughout the galaxy. This leads to the Warlord sending an assassin to try to kill him, and while Keill pursues the gunman he is captured, rendered unconscious and taken to the far side of the Galaxy.

There, on the technologically advanced planet Golvic, he meets Altern - "The One" - and is introduced to the Warlord: The Golvicians had created a semi-organic device called Arachnis which links the minds of those attached and creates a hive mind with vastly increased intelligence. The Warlord is the Arachnis creators all linked together by the "touch of Arachnis".

Keill tries to fight Arachnis, but is enslaved by one of the tendrils and falls under the mental control of the Warlord.

The One notes that as Keill was responsible for the dissolution of the Warlords earlier fighting force (The legions of Rilyn, from Day of the Starwind) it is fitting that he trains a replacement team. Over a period of months Keill trains a group of mutants from the Altered Worlds, each with distinct fighting styles benefitting their mutations. Glr has tracked Keill to Golvic, and is observing him, enacting a guerrilla war against the Golvician military.

After destroying a power station in Golvic city, Keill is ordered to find and kill Glr, but it is a trap to lure him out of the city, and in a fight she removes the fragment of Arachnis tendril controlling Keill, returning his free will. Glr tells him that the Warlord has established a new base on the Overseers asteroid, and the two head back to confront the Warlord, The One, and the Deathwing team trained by Keill.

Once at the asteroid base, Keill and Glr make their way through the corridors wiping out Deathwing agents as they go. Eventually Keill confronts The One who is guarding the 24 scientists who make up the mind-linked Warlord. The One's new golden body is stronger than his old one, and Keill through as much luck as skill uses the Warlord's own energy field to destroy The One. He disengages the tendrils from the scientists driving them insane, and breaking the Warlord's hive mind control.

With the Warlord defeated Keill finds himself without purpose, until Glr suggests they explore the galaxy. Keill believes this to be impossible as prolonged exposure to overlight causes insanity. Glr suggests that they contact her species to provide them with a more powerful overlight ship that can traverse the galaxy in weeks, and he agrees.

== Literary reception ==
Anne Osborn in the School Library Journal did not have much good to say about Young Legionary. She says that "Hill's trademark, non-stop action is at its best; the pages go by in a blur. The pace slows down only when the author attempts to deal with a complex relationship; he has no feelings for emotional subtleties; sentence fragments grate. Discerning readers may be disappointed by the comic book plot and hackneyed prose".

Jerry Spiegler in the School Library Journal describes Keill Randor as the cybernetic Bruce Lee of the future. He says that "readers will enjoy the fast-paced action as long as they don't mind the many violent confrontations. Not great literature but a lot of fun and excitement".

Mary I. Purucker in the School Library Journal said that Day of the Starwind was "full of action, cave-dwelling monsters and violence, this moves along at a good clip and leaves readers breathlessly waiting for the next in the series".

Carolyn Caywood in the School Library Journal said that Galactic Warlord was "pure space opera, pitting heroes against evil doers with lots of action but no real insight. The story is fast-paced, readable though not easy, and will have wide appeal among those teens who have enjoyed recent movie and television science fiction". She said of a sequel that "the constant action does not advance readers' knowledge about the Warlord, suggesting that several more books are planned before Keill finally catches up with his enemy. Like its predecessor, this is a successful imitation of the currently popular space movies. It is not as interesting, however, since most of the development of the characters and settings takes place in the first book".

== Film ==
In 2020, it was announced Plenitude Productions are developing a feature film adaptation.
