= The Voice of the Night =

1980 novel by Dean Koontz

- First edition
- Author: Dean Koontz (as Brian Coffey)
- Language: English
- Genre: Suspense, Horror novel
- Publisher: Doubleday
- Publication date: 1980
- Publication place: United States
- Media type: Print (Paperback)
- Pages: 277
- ISBN: 978-0425238134
- OCLC: 23966048

The Voice of the Night is a horror novel by American author Dean Koontz, released in 1980 under the pseudonym Brian Coffey.

== Plot ==
In the summer of 1980, introverted bookworm Colin Jacobs moves to Santa Leona, California, with his mother, and soon meets and becomes friends with another boy his age. Roy Borden is everything Colin has never been, but he secretly wishes he could be: brave, outgoing, muscular, athletically talented, and a consummate ladies' man. He is an instinctive fighter, ready to stand up to anyone or anything—a stark contrast to Colin, who "learned long ago that resistance causes pain" and avoids trouble and confrontations.

Despite their differences, Roy appears glad to be friends with Colin, even remarking that the boys and girls who think they are his friends are really just acquaintances. Colin and Roy become close friends in a short period of time, and Roy declares them to be blood brothers after a brief ceremony. Roy displays some odd behavior, such as asking if Colin has ever killed anything and calling anything fun a popper, but Colin does not think anything of it.

Colin meets a beautiful girl called Heather Lipschitz in a store one day, and he is overwhelmed but thrilled as he realizes the two are developing a romantic interest in each other. He does not tell Roy, but assumes that his association with Roy has indeed helped his own image and made girls more interested in him. Roy begins to confide more in Colin, revealing an extremely cynical worldview, and an obsession with sex, violence, and death. Colin treats it as a joke, even as Roy claims to have killed two other boys who refused his offer to be blood brothers. He leads Colin to an abandoned house by a railroad line, where he has set up an old pickup truck and prepared it to be pushed downhill to cause an approaching passenger train to wreck. He asks for Colin's help, but Colin, realizing it was never a joke, tries to stop him. Roy throws Colin aside to push the truck down to the tracks on his own, but it needed two people to keep it on course, and Roy screams in rage as the train goes by unharmed.

Roy tries to kill Colin in the junkyard, but after narrowly escaping, Colin finds that no one believes him when he tries to reveal who Roy is. Colin turns to Heather, and the two of them work to uncover the secrets of Roy's hidden life. They learn that Roy is adopted, and also that he accidentally killed his adoptive sister Belinda when he was eight years old and got behind the wheel of his adopted father's car while Belinda was playing behind it. Mrs. Borden, who came outside just in time to see it happen, went into shock and said over and over "Her little head...it just popped." Soon after, Mrs. Borden, who has always been obsessed with keeping her house spotlessly clean, savagely beat Roy with a metal dustpan when he came home and tracked dirt into the house. Severely traumatized by both incidents, Roy became deeply cynical and embraced the idea that he was a murderer, convincing himself over time that he did it all on purpose. Lonely and desperate for a real friend, Roy tried reaching out to two boys before Colin, and Colin and Heather confirm that the boys really did die when, where and how Roy said they did.

Colin calls Roy and convinces him that he got girls for both of them, and Roy reluctantly agrees to meet him at an abandoned mansion at the edge of town so they can take turns raping her. Despite her own fear of the situation, Heather agrees to be the bait, and Colin makes it look as if she was beaten up and then tied to a chair. Roy arrives ahead of time, and Colin manages to hide the revolver he stole from his mother's bedroom. Colin pretends that he sees things Roy's way, and that he wants to be blood brothers again. Roy initially doesn't believe him, but is amazed to see Heather there, just as Colin promised. Colin pretends to be eager to "share" her with Roy, impressing and delighting him.

Roy declares they are brothers again, but Colin takes out the revolver and says he is taking Roy in. Roy realizes he has been tricked and attacks, and Colin is hopelessly outmatched as they fight. He manages to get the revolver back, and shoots Roy in the leg as they struggle. Roy looks up as Colin gets ready to fire again, this time at Roy's head, and his expression reveals something shocking: Roy is desperately unhappy, and wants to be put out of his misery. Colin fights down the urge to kill him, and goes outside to call the police. As he does, he realizes that the "voice of the night" is within him, too, and he must resist the urge to listen to it like Roy did.
