= Gail Robinson (writer) =

Canadian writer

Gail Robinson is a Canadian poet, novelist, and writer for radio.

Born in Delisle, Saskatchewan, Robinson is a graduate of the University of Saskatchewan and the author of four books, including God of the Plains, Coyote the Trickster, Raven the Trickster, and a volume of poetry. She is a regular contributor to both the CBC and BBC radio networks, and has written for NPR in the United States as well.
