= Jean-Louis Dolliole =

American architect who was a free person of color

- Born: 1779; New Orleans, Louisiana USA
- Died: 9 January 1861 (aged 81–82); New Orleans, Louisiana USA
- Occupation: Architect
- Design: Creole cottage Creole townhouse

Jean-Louis Dolliole (1779 – January 9, 1861) was an African-American architect in New Orleans, Louisiana, USA, during the 19th century. He was a free man of color who also worked as a cabinetmaker, home builder, contractor, planter and leader of the African-American community of New Orleans in the time of the Antebellum South. Dolloile is noted for the architectural design of several residential projects which continue in use as homes into the 21st century. The designs were early versions of the creole cottage that became a common style of homes in New Orleans and elsewhere in the southern United States. Dolliole was a leader in the early development of the Faubourg Tremé neighborhood of New Orleans.

== Personal life ==
Dolliole's father, Louis Dolliole, was from Provence and worked for many years as a builder in La Seyne-sur-Mer, France. At some point in the 1760s, the extended Dolliole family had emigrated to French Louisiana, settling in the Bayou St. John district which was then a suburb of New Orleans. Dolliole's father Louis resumed his career as a builder and designer in his new hometown. Louis Dolliole became romantically involved with a free woman of color, Geneviève ("Mamie") Laronde (alternative spelling Larronde). Laronde already had three children, and the couple went on to have four children together. One of these four children was Jean-Louis Dolliole, who was born in New Orleans in 1779.

However, the record is contradictory on Dolliole's birth. At least biographical source states that Dolliole was born in La Seyne-sur-Mer, France, that his mother was French although of African descent, and that the family emigrated to New Orleans in 1800.

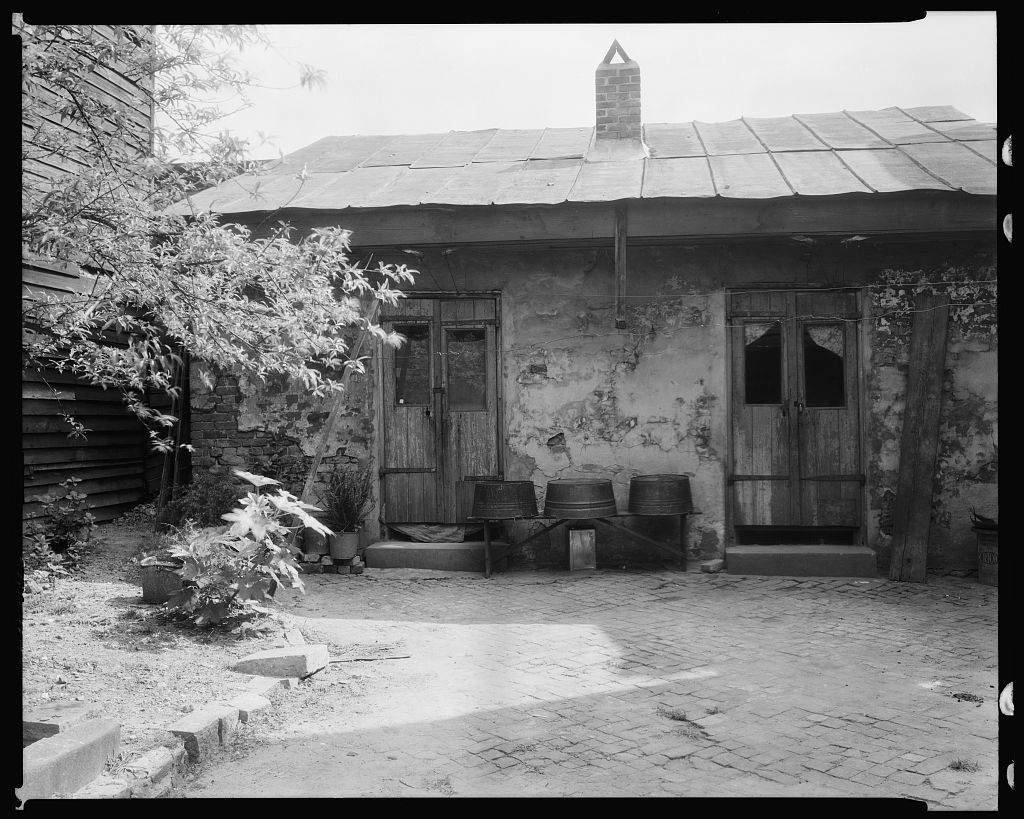
Dolloile family home at 933 St. Philip Street in New Orleans, as seen in 1937 (photo courtesy of the Library of Congress)

Louis Dolliole's sons, Jean-Louis, Joseph and Pierre, likewise became builders and designers. Jean-Louis Dolliole went on to become the most notable of the architect-builders in the family. Either as a group or working independently, they built many French-style houses, notably with their sloping roofs, in the Tremé district of New Orleans.

During the War of 1812, Jean-Louis Dolliole and others of his family enlisted in the Louisiana militia battalion for free men of color. Dolliole served as a private in Fortier’s Battalion during the Battle of New Orleans, defending the city from the British military. He previously was a signatory to the petition sent to Governor William Claiborne of Louisiana to enable free men of color to serve in the local militia.

In February 1818, Jean-Louis Dolliole married a free black woman, Hortense Dussau. Also, because of his mother's African heritage, Dolliole was himself considered a "free person of color" under the Black Codes extant in New Orleans at the time. Free persons of color in Louisiana at the time accounted for about 10% of the population. Despite oppression, many of them, including the Dolliole family, were influential and impactful locally. They were typically known at the time as "gens de couleur libre". Dolliole became active within the community of the freepeople of color in New Orleans, often helping others with business and legal matters.

By the time of their marriage, Dolliole and Dussau had already had three children together. Dussau died in 1820. Dolliole subsequently was re-married to Marie Dolliole who was classified at the time as a mulatta and had immigrated to New Orleans from the French West Indies. As he became more affluent, Dolliole and his immediate family moved to a large home on Bayou Road (today known as Governor Nicholls Street) in the Bayou St. John district.

== Architectural career ==
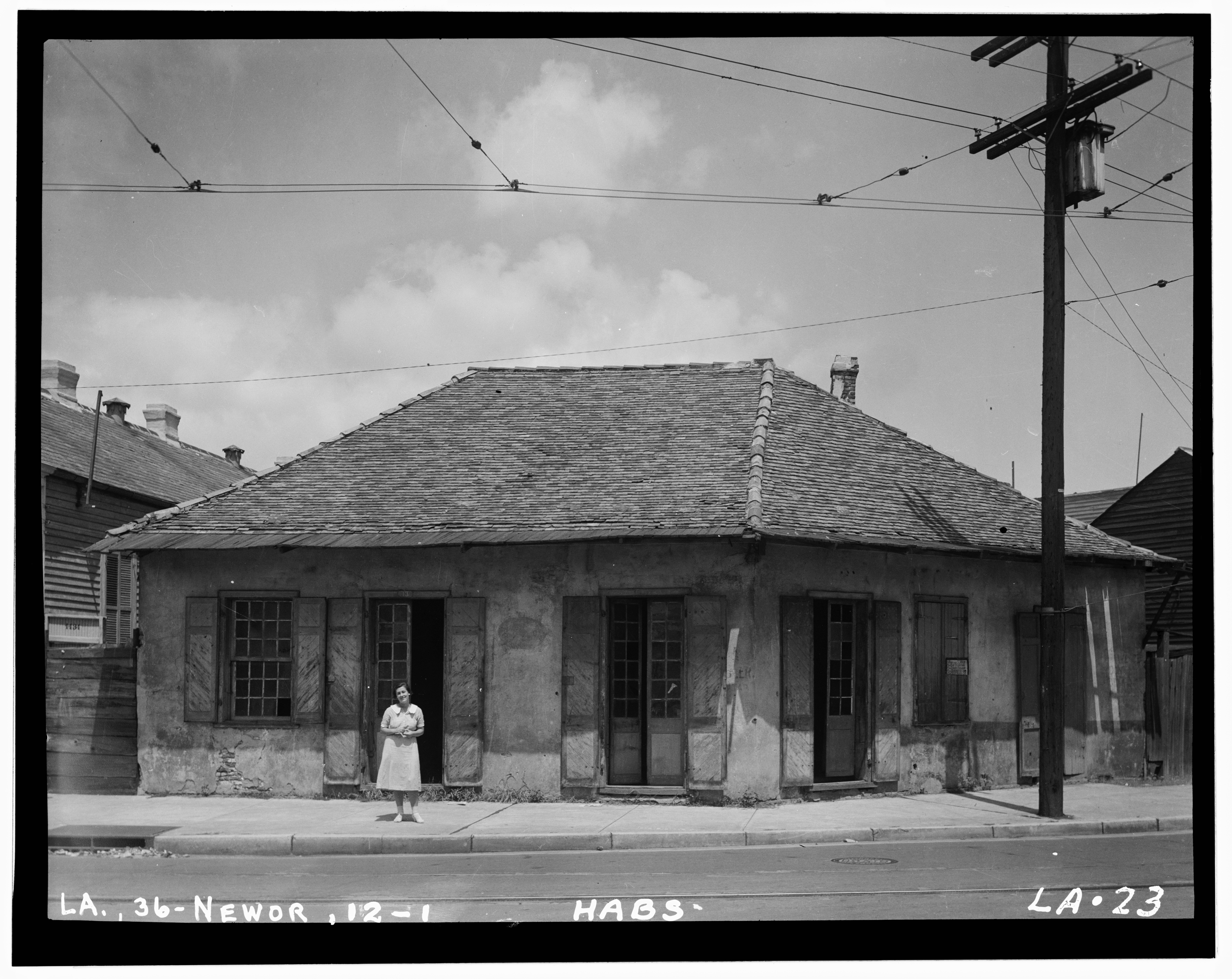
Dolliole Cottage as seen in 1934, photo from the Historic American Buildings Survey (Richard Koch)

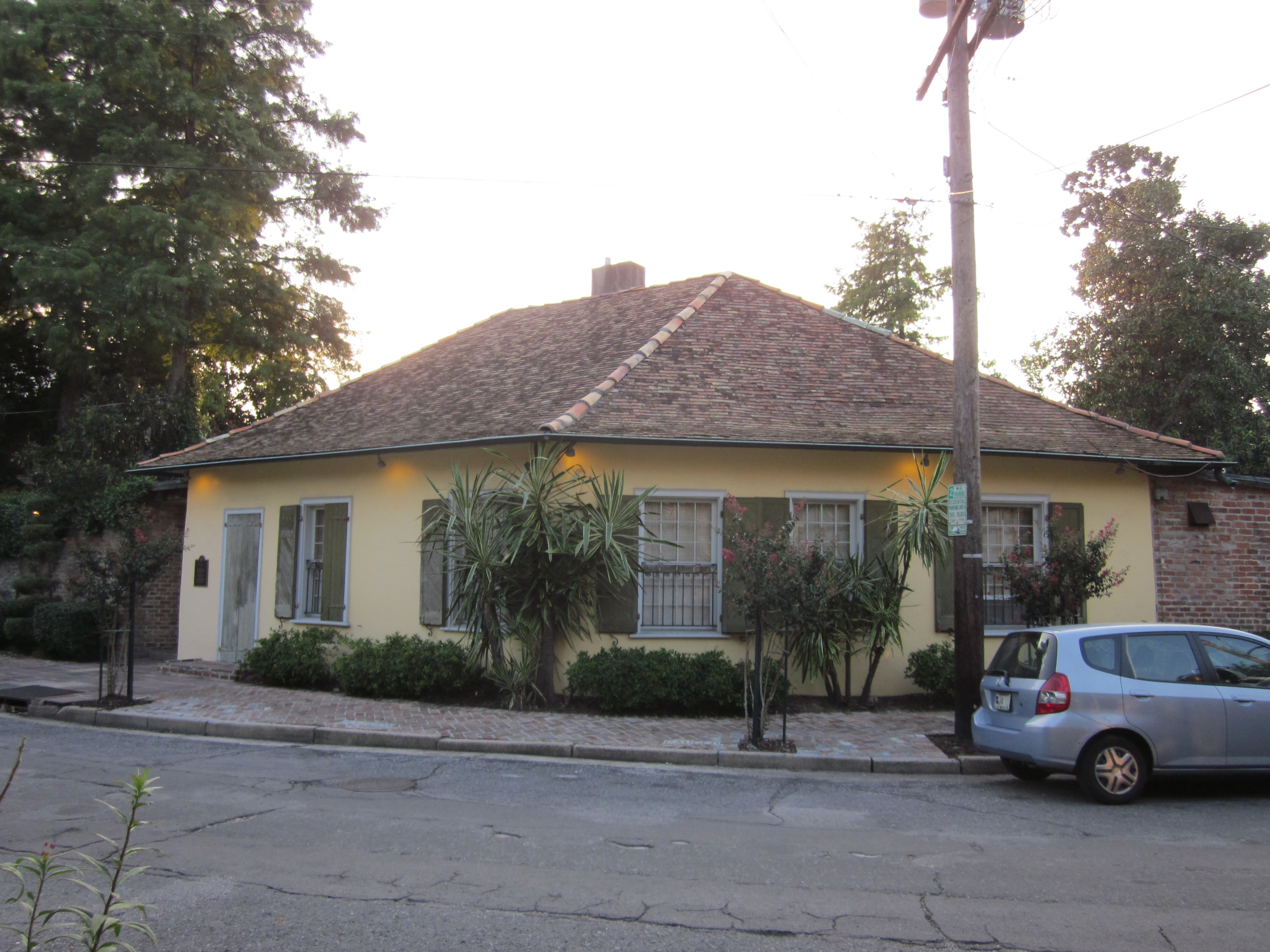
Dolliole Cottage as seen in 2010

Dolliole began his career in New Orleans as an architect and builder, working with his father and his uncle Jean-François Dolliole. They emphasized versions of the creole cottage adapted for city residential use, sometimes known as "creole townhouses". In 1819, Jean-Louis Dolliole built a house for his mother-in-law on Pauger Street, near where the New Orleans French Quarter borders Fauborg Marigny. The home had the name "Bagatelle", although it is often known by other names, including "Jean-Louis Dolliole House", "Dolliole Cottage" and "Pauger Cottage". The house made use of local materials and has a hip roof with four slopes supporting flat roof tiles and with 10-foot (3-meter) roof projections that allow rainwater to drain directly to the street. This home and others in this style have window shutters with iron-strap hinges. The home remained in the Dolliole family until 1858, and the home persists today.

The Dolloile family's involvement with architectural innovations in New Orleans had started when his mother Laronde purchased the property at 933 St. Philip Street in the French Quarter of New Orleans. This property remained in the family for more than 50 years, although ownership changed from one family member to another during this period. The St. Philip Street property became the center for the homes designed by Jean-Louis Dolliole, with many of these homes in the immediate vicinity and were constructed as homes for various family members.

During the antebellum period, there was much need for construction, especially for housing, in New Orleans as a result of significant population growth. The housing shortage was exacerbated by the New Orleans fire of 1794 and the New Orleans fire of 1788.

The Dolliole family acquired more properties surrounding their St. Philip Street home as a result of Jean-Louis Dolliole's design and construction projects. Ownership varied among family members. Black codes in force in Louisiana law limited the ability of property to pass through inheritance. Dolliole and other family members circumvented these restrictions through inter vivos gifts and various property sales within the extended family.

=== Style ===
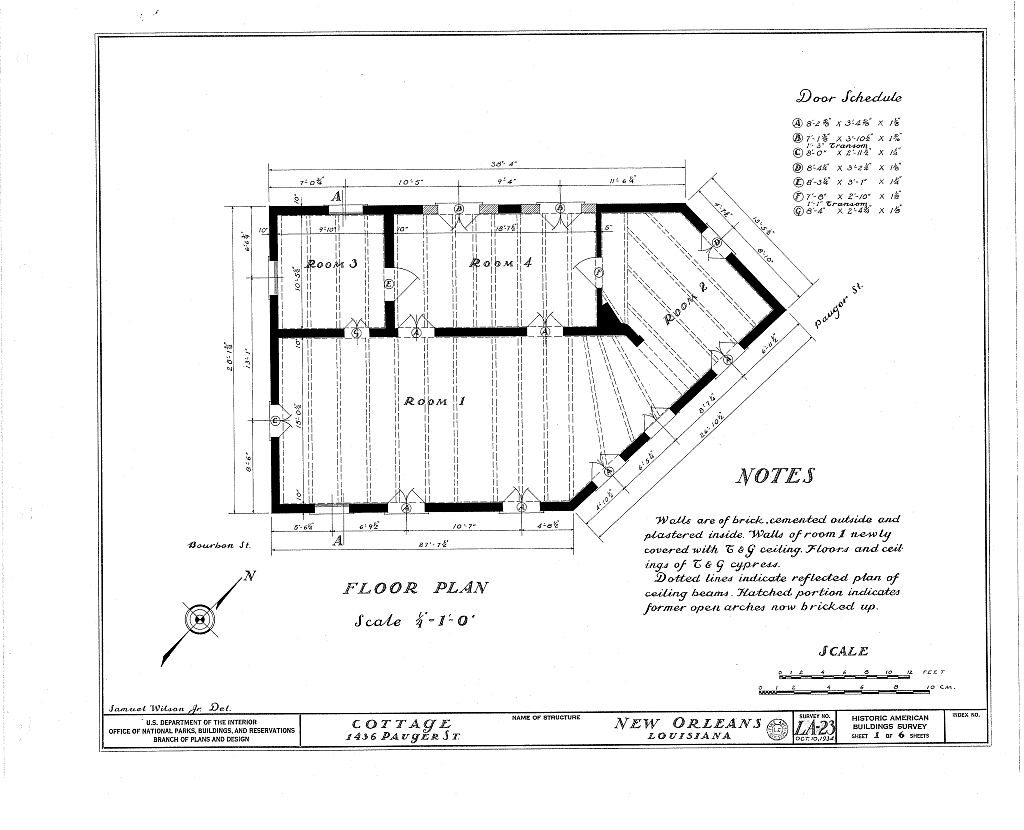
Floor plan for the Pauger Street home showing the pentagonal design for this creole cottage (image from the Library of Congress)

Dolliole's architectural style is characterized by use of locally sourced country brick, cedar wood, and pine wood as construction materials, with simple, unadorned façades on the street side of the homes. This style is an adaptation of French construction practices for local needs in southeast Louisiana.

The home at 1436 Pauger Street in New Orleans came to be known as the Dolliole-Clapp House and is illustrative of his designs. The home has a creole cottage appearance from the street but is pentagonal in shape because the lot is itself pentagonal. This home, like others of Dolliole's design, was built with bricks between wooden posts. It has a pan tile roof. It has a hipped roof with a large overhang along the front. Unlike creole cottages, Dolliole's urban designs do not have overhangs along the sides, owing to the close proximity to adjoining structures.

=== Influences ===
Dolliole was active in the local business community and interacted with local notable people such as Marie Laveau, Jean Lafitte, and the real estate developer Laurent Ursain Guesnon. He often defended people of the black community and his name was cited in the newspaper Le Moniteur de la Louisiane, especially for legal activities in support of other free people of color.

Dolliole was one of several influential African-American architects in New Orleans during Antebellum times, a group that shaped the architectural style of the community. These architectural styles especially included the creole cottages and the creole townhouses of the New Orleans French Quarter, the Faubourg Tremé and the Faubourg Marigny neighborhoods. Other influential architects of New Orleans who were free people of color included members of the Souliés family and Francois Boisdoré, although Dolliole is reputed to be the most prolific of the group.

== Death ==
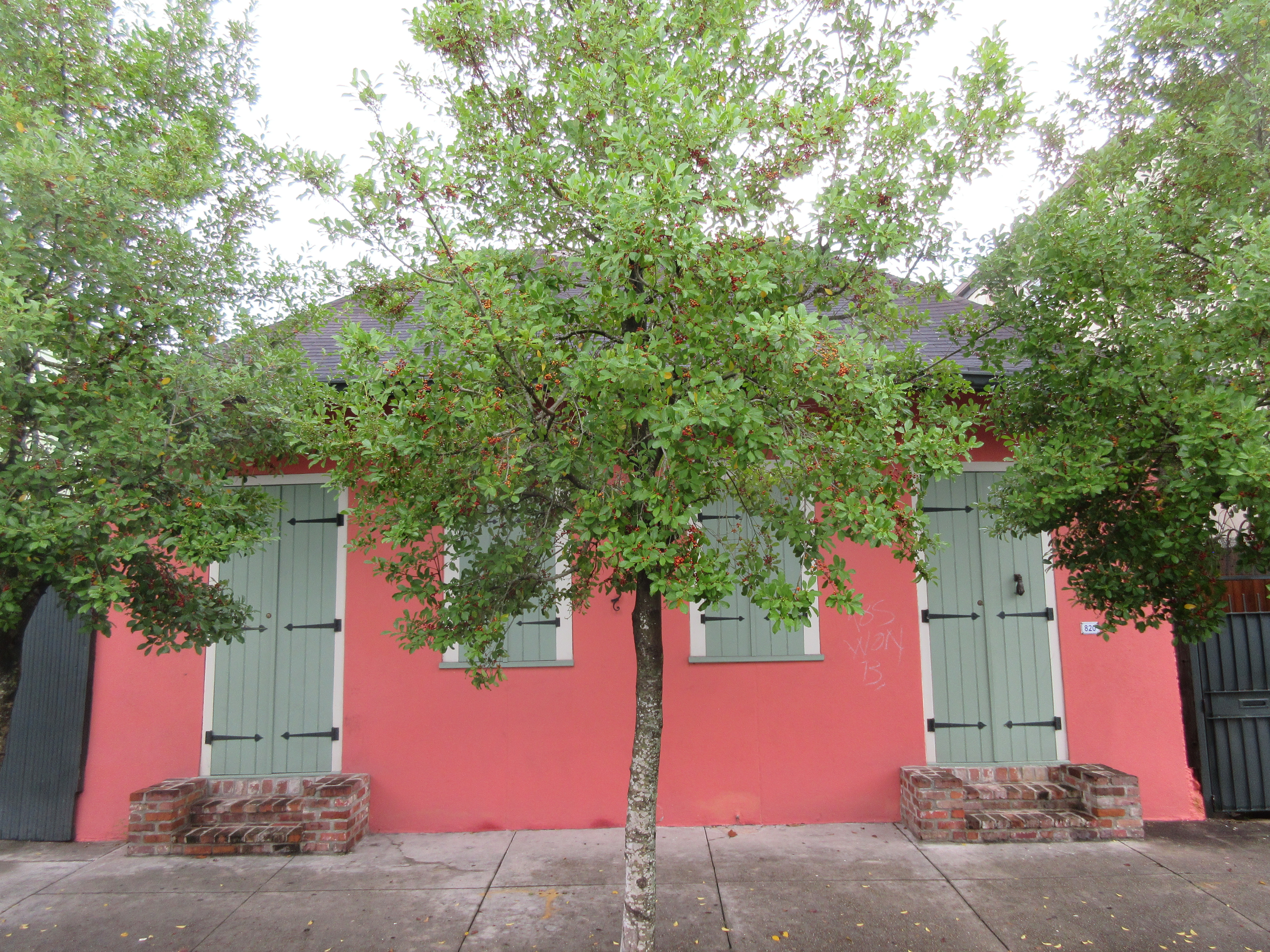
Dolliole's creole townhouse at 820 Elysian Fields Avenue, Faubourg Marigny, New Orleans (photo courtesy of Infrogmation).

Dolliole died in his home in 1861 due to lingering effects of urinary tract infections. At the time of his death, he owned seven properties and died with an estate valued at $13,959 in 1861 dollars. He was interred at St. Louis Cemetery Number 1, in the same tomb as his father and other family members.
