= Roller shutter =

Type of door or window shutter consisting of many horizontal slats hinged together

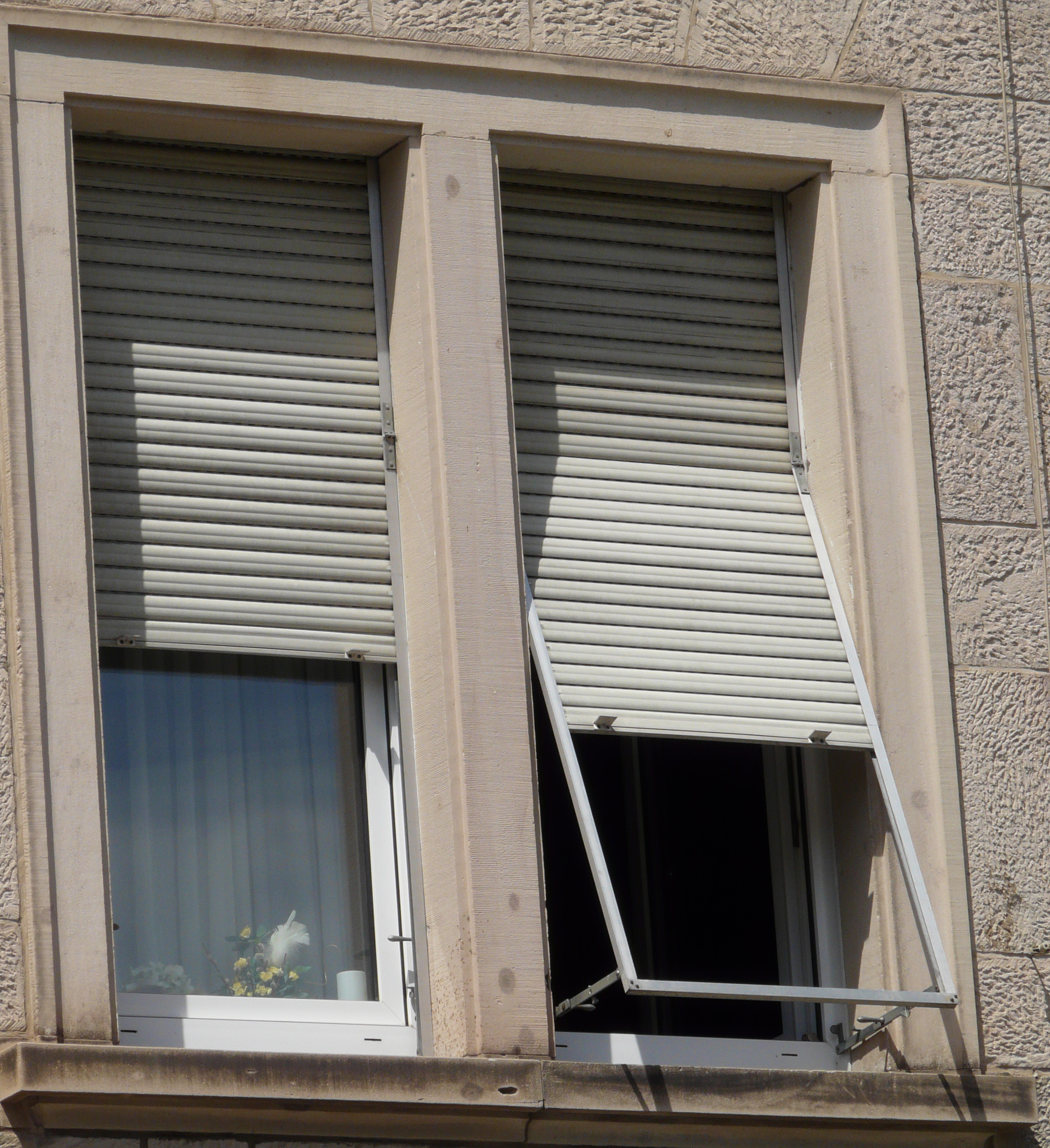
Roll shutters on windows.

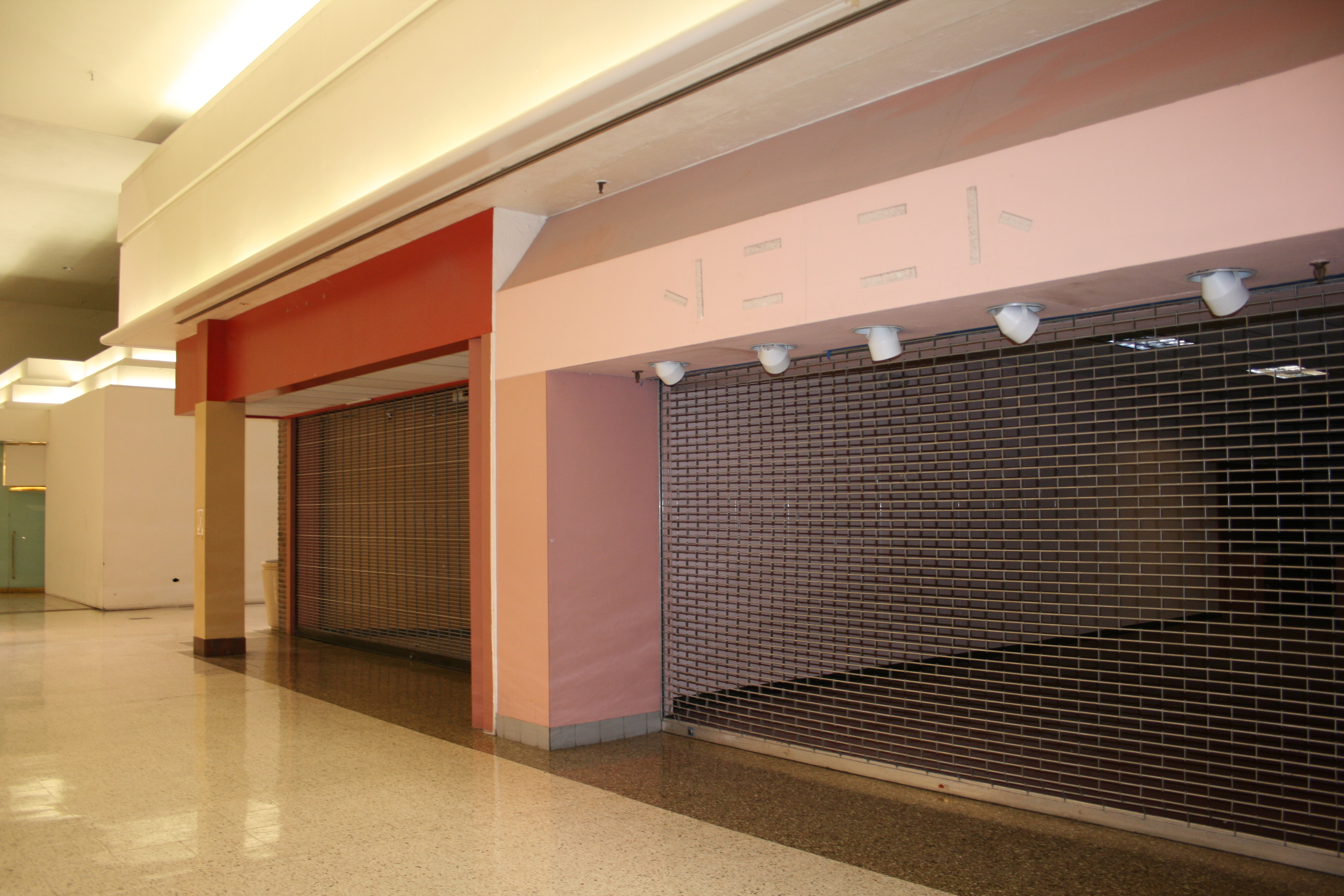
Security roller shutters in a dead mall.

A roller shutter, security shutter, coiling door, roller door or sectional overhead door is a specialized type of door or window shutter consisting of multiple horizontal slats, bars, or web systems interconnected through hinges. The shutter is attached to an axle at the top (the roller), and this axle is rotated to lift and roll up the shutter to open it, or to lower it to close. The axle is typically rotated either manually, typically by pulling a strap, or an automated, motorized system may be employed, particularly for larger doors.

This versatile design offers comprehensive protection against various elements, including wind, rain, fire, and theft. When used as a shutter in front of windows, it serves as a formidable deterrent against vandalism and thwarting burglary attempts, reinforcing the security of the enclosed space. It also usually completely blocks out sun light.

== Applications ==
Roller shutters have many applications including doors for vans, garages, kitchens, schools, prisons and warehouses. They are also commonly used as window blinds in some European countries, such as Italy, Germany, France and Spain.

These shutters serve as insulation in locations prone to harsh weather conditions, safeguarding windows from hail damage and designed to endure strong winds.

In specific jurisdictions, property owners might need to obtain a permit or face restrictions on installing specific types of roller shutters on their building exteriors. The cost of these systems can be significant, with the cost being upwards of $25,000-40,000. Plywood boards can also act as a similar deterrent to theft and burglary.

== Types and operation ==
Built-on roller shutter door
Describes the type where the roller shutter box is fixed to the exterior of the building facade.

Built-in roller shutter doors
Where the roller shutter box is built into the lintel above the window.

Integrated roller shutter
A roller shutter and window combined as a single unit.

Roller shutter with tilting louvres
A roller shutter with laths that tilt, similar to an external venetian blind.

Manual
With gear drive from the shutter roller traced through the building facade to a universal joint on the room side that is operated by a cranked winding handle.

Manual tape
A tape drive around a flange on the roller is traced through the building facade with pulley guides to an inertia reel on the room side:

Spring assist
Spring assist roller shutters are operated by manually lowering or lifting the handle which is mounted to the curtain end slat. Most cost effective solutions for securing small spaces.

Motorized/Electric
With a tubular motor fitted within the roller axle tube. Automatic operation can be added. Controlled with a smartphone, remote or hardwired switch.

== Components ==
Slats
Can be made of plastic, wood, or metal, such as extruded or roll formed steel, aluminium or stainless steel. Single or multi wall. Hollow or insulated designs. Shutters used to protect against theft or adverse weather events are usually made of metal.

Roller (or axle tube)
Steel, aluminium tube supported at either end by an end plate.

Shutter box
Formed steel or aluminium extrusion box designed to protect shutter's internal components.

Shutter spring

1. Spring wire. Made from the spring wire, it also called torsion spring.
2. Flat spring. Formed by hardened and tempered steel strips in coils. Common steel grades C67, CK67, SAE1070, etc.
3. Not used in all types of shutters.

Guide rail (or track)
Steel or aluminium to retain the shutter curtain within the opening. Weather sealed to increase product lifetime and reduce operating vibration.

Bottom slat
Steel, aluminium or PVC to match the rest of the roller shutter curtain. Safety edge or rubber weather seal to reduce draught can be added.

Lock
Important part of roller shutter used to manually secure the curtain slats in place. Can be locked with slide lock and bullet lock. Slim key locks are installed within the end slat and have bars that securely lock shutter into the guide rails.

== See also ==
- Roller blind
- Roll-down curtain
