= Battle of New Orleans order of battle: American =

United States Forces, Louisiana
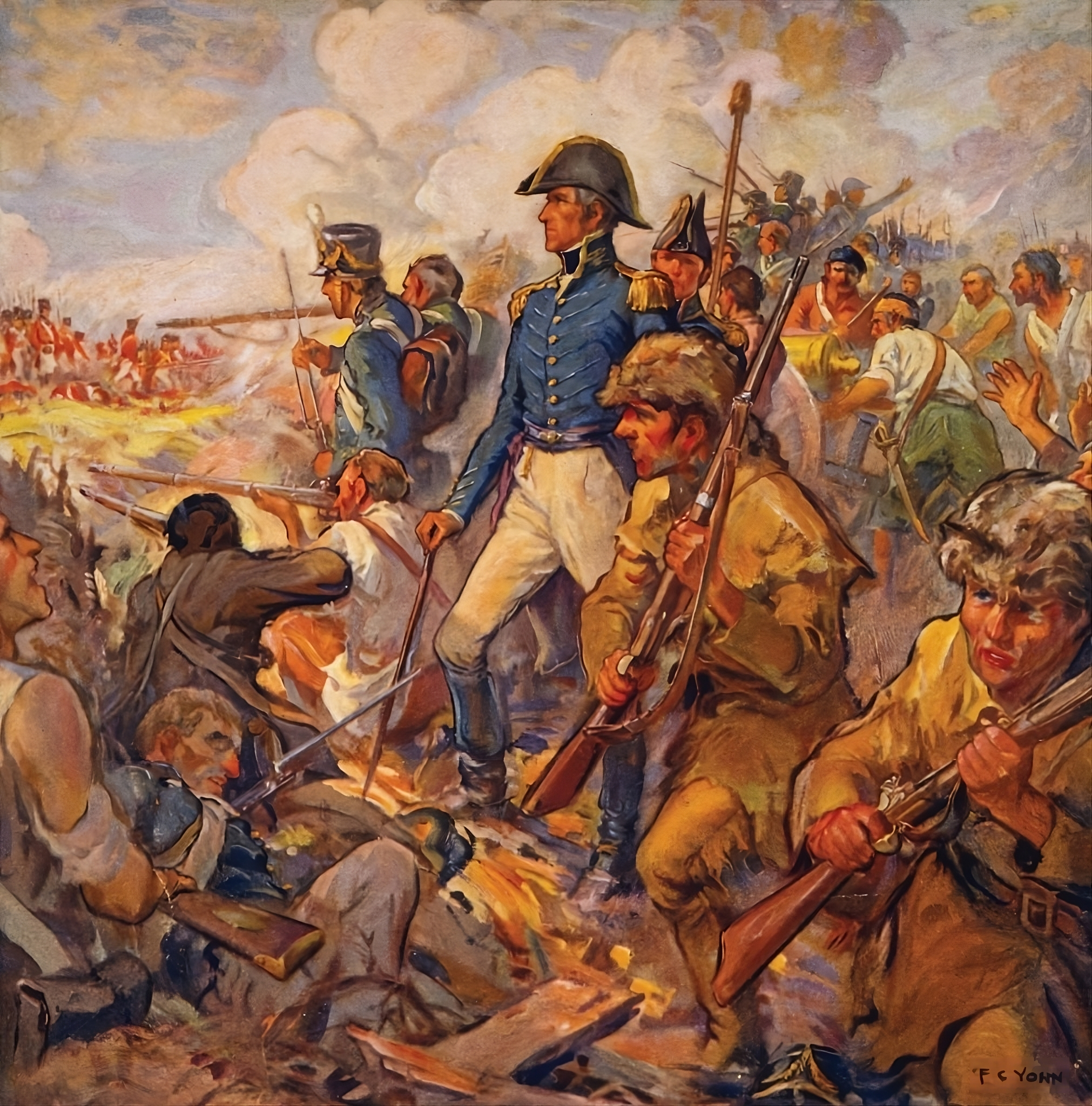
- Andrew Jackson surrounded by his troops at the Battle of New Orleans, 1815
- Active: 1814–1815
- Country: United States of America
- Branch: United States Army
- Type: Army
- Size: 4,698 men on the Left Bank >750 men on the Right Bank
- Engagements: Battle of New Orleans

Commanders
- Commander-in-chief (1 December 1814 – 27 January 1815): Major General Andrew Jackson

The following units and commanders of the American armed forces under Andrew Jackson fought at the Battle of New Orleans during War of 1812. The British order of battle is shown separately.

== Abbreviations used ==
=== Military rank ===
- MG = Major General
- BG = Brigadier General
- Col = Colonel
- Ltc = Lieutenant Colonel
- Maj = Major
- Cpt = Captain

=== Other ===
- k = killed
- w = wounded
- m = missing

== Forces ==
7th Military District: MG Andrew Jackson

General Staff

- Advisers to General Jackson: Brigadier General Jean Joseph Amable Humbert,
  Governor William C. C. Claiborne
- Aides-de-camp: Abner Lawson Duncan, John Randolph Grymes, Edward Livingston
- Aide-de-camp and judge advocate, Major Auguste Davezac
- Volunteer chief of engineers: Arsène Lacarrière-Latour

Division	Brigade	Regiments and Others	Strength	k (Note: Reproducing Adjutant General Robert Butler's casualty report to Brigadier General Parker dated January 16, 1815. 13 dead, 39 wounded, 19 missing or captured; total: 71.)	w	m
Left Wing MG William Carroll	Carroll's Brigade MG William Carroll	1st Regiment West Tennessee Militia: Col William Metcalf; 2nd Regiment West Tennessee Militia: Col John Cocke; 3rd Regiment West Tennessee Militia: Col James Raulston	1100 aggregated (Note: A grand total of 4,698 men on the Left Bank)	4	8	0
Left Wing MG William Carroll	Coffee's Brigade BG John Coffee	1st Regiment West Tennessee Volunteer Mounted Gunmen: Col Robert Dyer; 2nd Regiment West Tennessee Volunteer Mounted Gunmen: Col Thomas Williamson; Jugeant's Choctaws: Maj Pierre Jugeant	813 aggregated Tennesseans	1	0	0
Left Wing MG William Carroll	Adair's Brigade BG John Adair	Slaughter's Kentucky Militia: Ltc Gabriel Slaughter; Gray's Kentucky Militia Regiment: Ltc John Davis (detached to West Bank); Mitchusson's Kentucky Militia Regiment: Ltc William Mitchusson	526 elsewhere 462 (Note: Mitchusson on the Left Bank alternatively had a strength of not 462, but 746 officers and enlisted men, according to Quisenberry. From within this, Maj Reuben Harrison was detached. He had a strength of 305 men, according to Smith (1904) p.74 and Quisenberry (1915) p.140, or 306 according to Buell (1904).)	1	12	0
Right Wing Col George T. Ross	Louisiana Militia and Volunteers MG Jacques Villeré; Col Pierre de la Ronde; Jean Michel Fortier	Battalion of Orleans (city): Maj Jean Baptiste Plauché; Lacoste's Free Men of Color: Maj Pierre Lacoste; Daquin's Free Men of Color: Maj Louis Daquin; City Rifles: Cpt Thomas Beale; Baratarians (gunners from Jean Lafitte's privateer crews); Three regiments of Louisiana Militia on West Bank with General Morgan	742 aggregate	1	15	0
Right Wing Col George T. Ross	U.S. Regular Army	7th U.S. Infantry: Maj Henry D. Peire; 44th U.S. Infantry: Col George T. Ross; U.S. Marines: Maj Daniel Carmick	671 aggregate (Note: On the Left Bank 'the Seventh regular infantry, 430 strong... and 240 regulars of the Forty-fourth regiment')	2	1	0
	Ltc William MacRea	Gunners manning the artillery pieces	154 aggregate	3	1	0
Reporting directly	Reserves	Mississippi Dragoons: Maj Thomas Hinds; Captain Ogden's company of cavalry and a detachment of the Attakapas dragoons; Captain Chaveau's company of horse volunteers	150; 50; 30, subtotaling 230 cavalry	0	0	0
Reporting directly	Reserves	Battalion, Kentucky Militia: Maj Reuben Harrison	305	0	0	0
Reporting directly	West Bank; BG David B. Morgan	Naval contingent: Commodore Daniel Patterson	30 (Note: Patterson states this figure of 30 men, in his correspondence about the fighting on the Right Bank. The pseudo "Naval Battalion" of 106 men is an invention of Buell, which does not appear in other sources. The terminology in use for a body of seamen on shore of the Royal Navy was a "Naval Brigade", which may have been the inspiration for Buell.) (Note: "Some myths are manufactured by intent, and no one more assiduously invented material to cement the "western hunter" marksmanship myth at New Orleans than the industrious Augustus Caesar Buell, who actually created forgeries from the 1890s or earlier until his death in 1904... Buell was particularly anxious to bolster the prevailing myth that deadly American rifle marksmanship by Kentuckians and Tennesseans won the battle.... Buell's forgeries as presented in his Jackson biography were unfortunately accepted at face value by some subsequent historians. Stanley C Arthur, admittedly not a trained historian... used much of Buell's fiction in [his book] "New Orleans".")	0	0	0
Reporting directly	West Bank; BG David B. Morgan	2nd Louisiana Militia Brigade: Maj Paul Arnaud	640 (Note: Louis Valentin Foelckel's letter has a total strength of 640 Louisiana militiamen on the Right Bank, versus 546 Louisiana militiamen from Roosevelt.)	1	4	15
Reporting directly	West Bank; BG David B. Morgan	Gray's Kentucky Militia Regiment: Ltc John Davis (detached to West Bank from Adair)	250 & 150 (Note: Louis Valentin Foelckel's letter has LTC John Davis with 400 Kentucky militiamen on the Right Bank. Of these, Roosevelt has 180 with arms, another 70 with arms provided by the Naval Arsenal, for a "rifle" strength of 250, alongside 150 unarmed men.)	0	0	4
Reporting directly	West Bank; BG David B. Morgan	Additional Reinforcements (400 militiamen) from East Bank: Gen. Humbert	400 reinforcements	0	0	0

Location	Formation	Constituent vessels	Complements
In the river	Vessels of the Naval Station at New Orleans, reporting to Commodore Daniel Patterson	USS Louisiana, 8 x 24 pdr guns on the port side, 8 x 24 pdr guns on the starboard side	>120 crew (Note: The USS Yorktown was a 16-gun sloop-of-war of the United States Navy. This similar vessel had a complement of 150 crewmen)
In the river	Vessels of the Naval Station at New Orleans, reporting to Commodore Daniel Patterson	USS Carolina (lost on December 27, 1814), 3 x 9 pdr guns, 12 x 12 pdr guns	>100 crew
In the river	Vessels of the Naval Station at New Orleans, reporting to Commodore Daniel Patterson	2 Jeffersonian gunboats	2 crews totaling 52 men (Note: "It may be best to consider the large ones as having 41, and the small 26 men, which were the complements of the American gunboats of the same sizes.")

== Bibliography ==
- Davis, William C. (2019). The Greatest Fury: The Battle of New Orleans and the Rebirth of America. London, UK: Dutton Caliber, an imprint of Penguin Random House. ISBN 978-0-39-958522-7.
- Dudley, William S (February 2015). "The Pinchpenny Flotilla". Naval History. 29 (1). U.S. Naval Institute: 38–45.
- Greene, Jerome (September 5, 2004) [September 1985], "Chapter VI: Final Preparations", Jean Lafitte National Historic Park Historic Resource Study, National Park Service, U.S. Department of the Interior, "[Buell says] The breakdown of Jackson's available strength on both sides of the Mississippi was as follows:"
- Greene, Jerome (December 28, 2009) [1985], "Part 1 The New Orleans Campaign of 1814-1815 in Relation to the Chalmette Battlefield", The Search for the Lost Riverfront: Historical and Archaeological Investigations at the Chalmette Battlefield, Jean Lafitte National Historical Park and Preserve (PDF), National Park Service, U.S. Department of the Interior
- Hughes, Christine F.; Brodine, Charles E., eds. (2023). The Naval War of 1812: A Documentary History, Vol. 4. Washington: Naval Historical Center (GPO). ISBN 978-1-943604-36-4.
- Latour, Arsène Lacarrière (1999) [1816], Historical Memoir of the War in West Florida and Louisiana in 1814–15, with an Atlas, Gainesville: University Press of Florida, ISBN 0-8130-1675-4, OCLC 40119875
- O'Connor, Thomas (1817). An impartial and correct history of the war between the United States of America, and Great Britain. New York: John Low.
- Pickles, Tim (1994). New Orleans 1815: Andrew Jackson Crushes the British. Campaign 28. Osprey Publishing. p. 37. ISBN 978-1-85-532360-5.
- Quisenberry, Anderson Chenault (1969) [1915]. "X. The battle of New Orleans". Kentucky in the War of 1812. Genealogical Publishing Company. ISBN 0-8063-0282-8.
- Reilly, Robin (1974). The British at the gates – the New Orleans campaign in the War of 1812. New York: Putnam. OCLC 839952.
- Roosevelt, Theodore (1900). The Naval War of 1812. Vol. II. Annapolis: Naval Institute Press.
- Smith, Gene Allen (2008). "Preventing the "Eggs of Insurrection" from Hatching: The U.S. Navy and Control of the Mississippi River, 1806-1815" (PDF). Northern Mariner. issue Nos. 3-4, (July–October 2008). 18 (3–4). The Canadian Nautical Research Society: 79–91. doi:10.25071/2561-5467.355. S2CID 247349162.
- Smith, Zachary F. (1904), The battle of New Orleans, Louisville, Kentucky: John P. Morton & Co.
- "Troop Roster" (PDF). January 8 battle of Chalmette. National Park Service, U.S. Department of the Interior. April 17, 2015 [1977]. Archived from the original (PDF) on April 8, 2024.
