= Window shutter =

Type of window screen

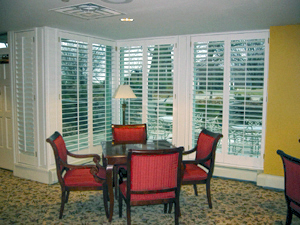
Interior plantation-style wood window shutters with open louvers

A window shutter is a solid and stable window covering, usually consisting of a frame of vertical stiles and horizontal rails (top, centre and bottom). Set within this frame can be louvers (both operable or fixed, horizontal or vertical), solid panels, fabric, glass and almost any other item that can be mounted within a frame. Shutters may be employed for a variety of reasons, including controlling the amount of sunlight that enters a room, to provide privacy, security, to protect against weather or unwanted intrusion or damage and to enhance the aesthetics of a building.

Depending on the application, and the construction of the window frame, shutters can be mounted to fit within the opening or to overlap the opening. The term window shutter includes both interior shutters, used on the inside of a house or building, and exterior shutters, used on the outside of a structure. On some styles of buildings it is common to have shutters to cover the doors as well as the windows.

== Interior shutters ==
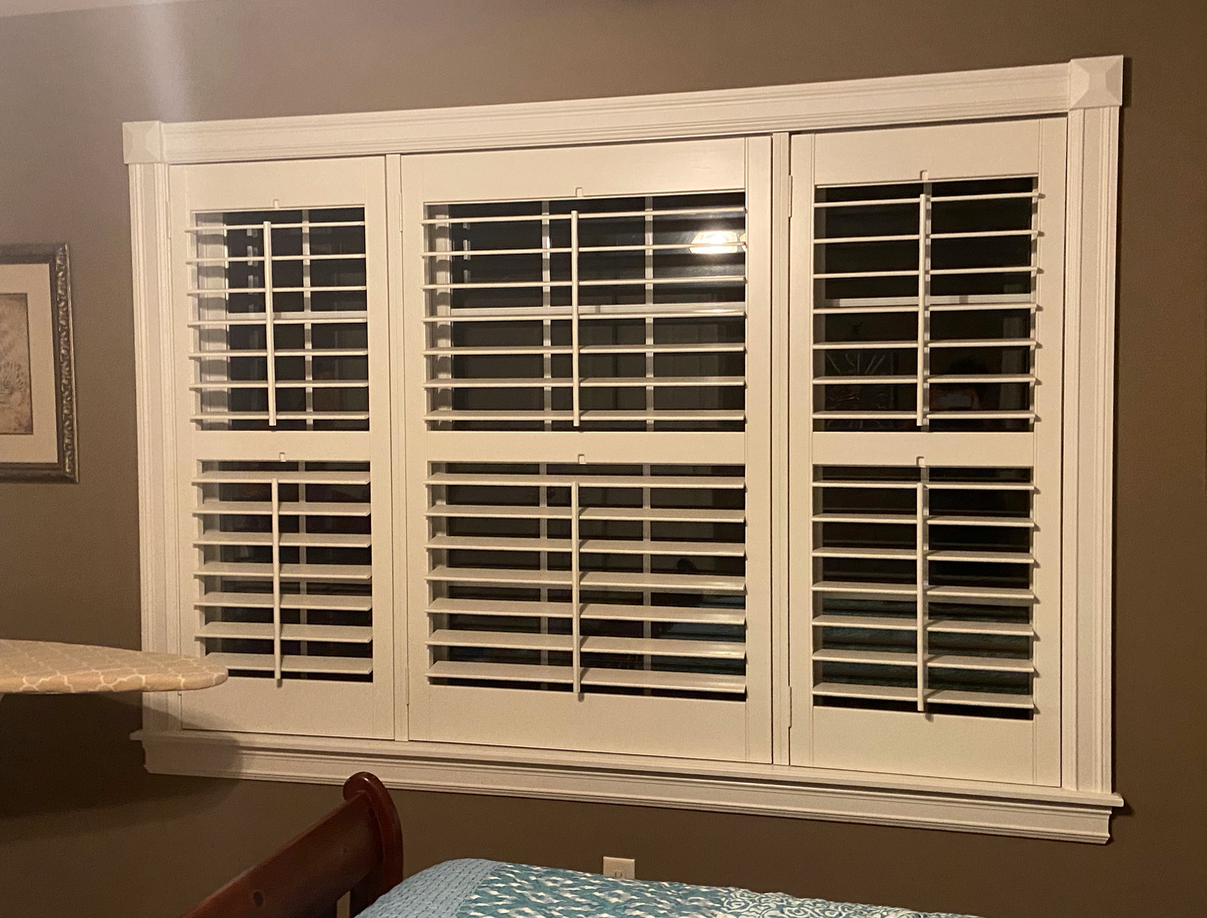
Modern interior wooden window shutters

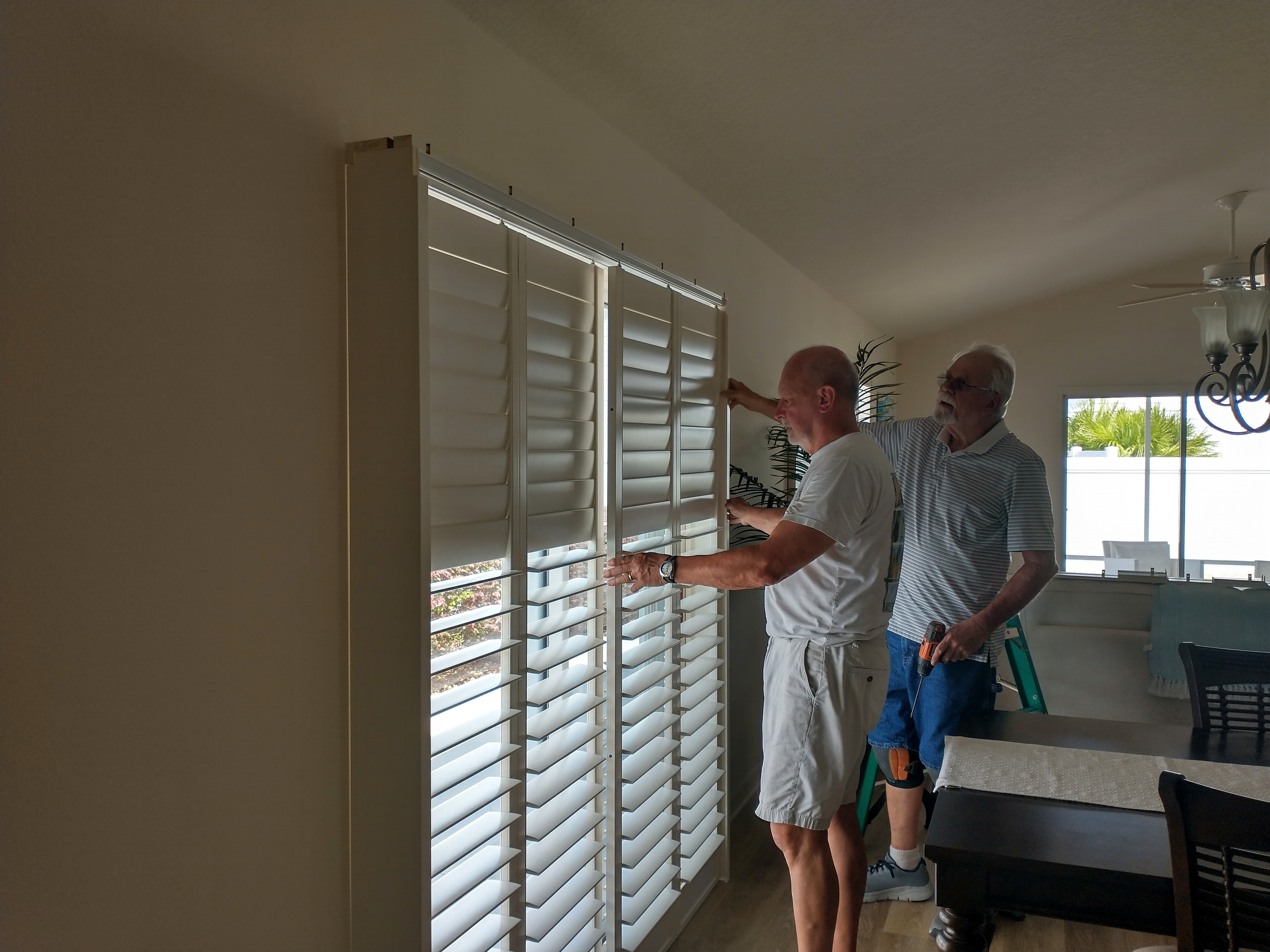
Workers installing plantation-style shutters in a home.

Interior shutters are typically divided into narrow units hinged accordion-style so that two or more units cover each side of a window opening when closed. Operable louvered shutters have louvers (or louvres in British usage), or slats, controlled by a tilt bar or rod to adjust the louver position and keep them in a uniform position, to control light, visibility and airflow. Shutters with operable louvers are described variously as traditional shutters or plantation shutters. Plantation shutters, typical of hot lower-latitude climates like Florida, South Africa, the Mediterranean or Australia, typically have only two shutters per window and wide louver blades.

Other interior shutters use stationary louvers that do not rotate (fixed louvers); solid raised or flat panels; fabric inserts; or tinted glass. Shutters can be configured in a single-tier unit that has one shutter top to bottom of a window opening as well as multiple tiers. Multiple-tier units feature separate shutters on each tier which allows the top shutters to be opened independently from the bottom shutters. Café-type shutters refer to shutters that only cover the lower portion of a window.

Full-height shutters can be made with a horizontal divider rail which separates the upper and lower portions of the shutter. With operable louvered shutters this gives greater control as the louvers above the divider rail can be operated independently from the louvers below the divider rail. Interior shutters can be constructed from numerous woods, which can be painted or stained, and a variety of synthetic materials. Interior shutters that are made to close tolerances are preferable for the best possible fit. When louvers or tilt bar (rod) become damaged, replacement kits for these damaged parts may be ordered online and are easy to install.

In the United Kingdom, most interior shutters historically were paneled.

== Exterior shutters ==
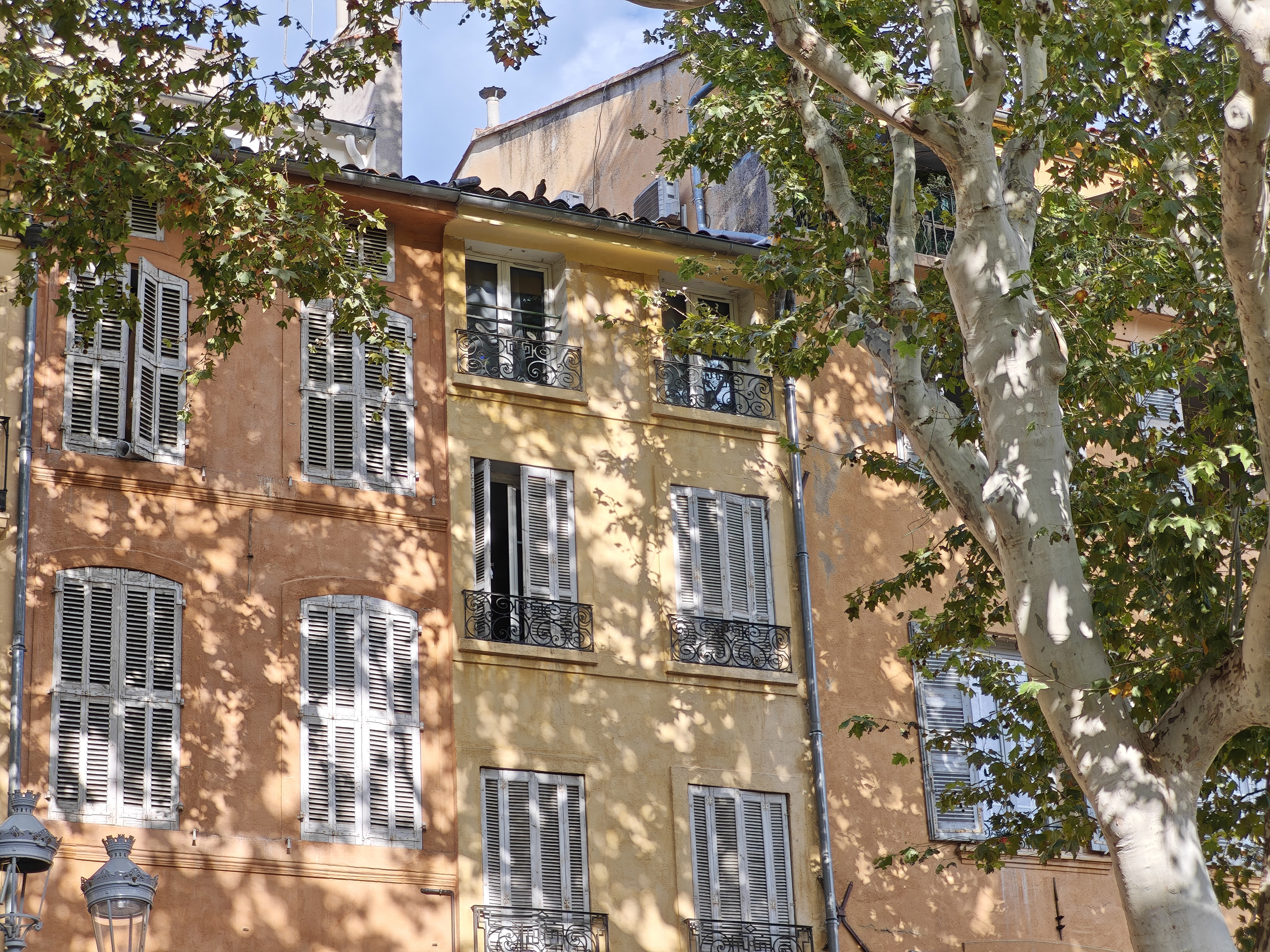
Shutters in Aix-en-Provence, France

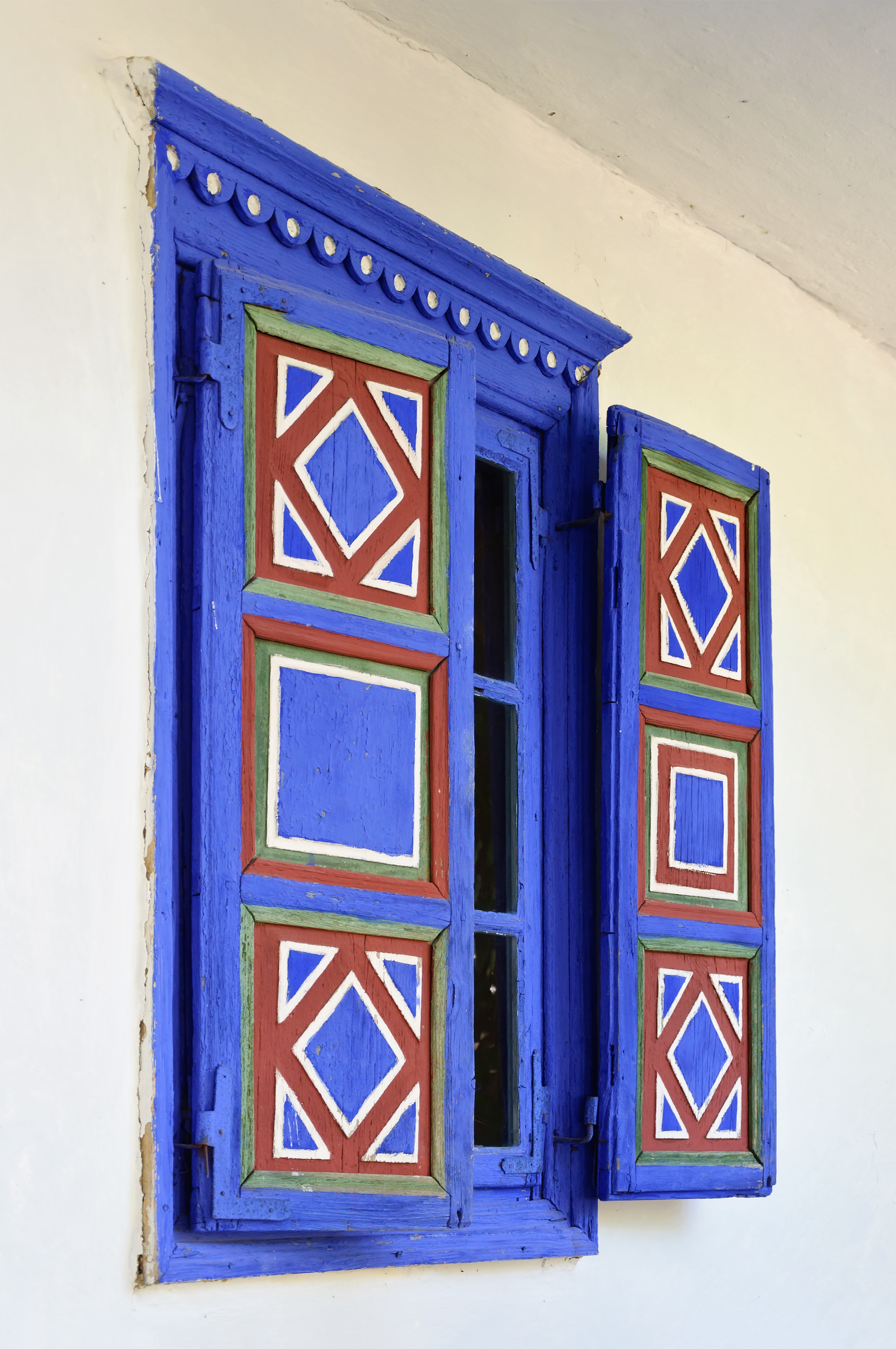
Brightly colored shutters in Romania

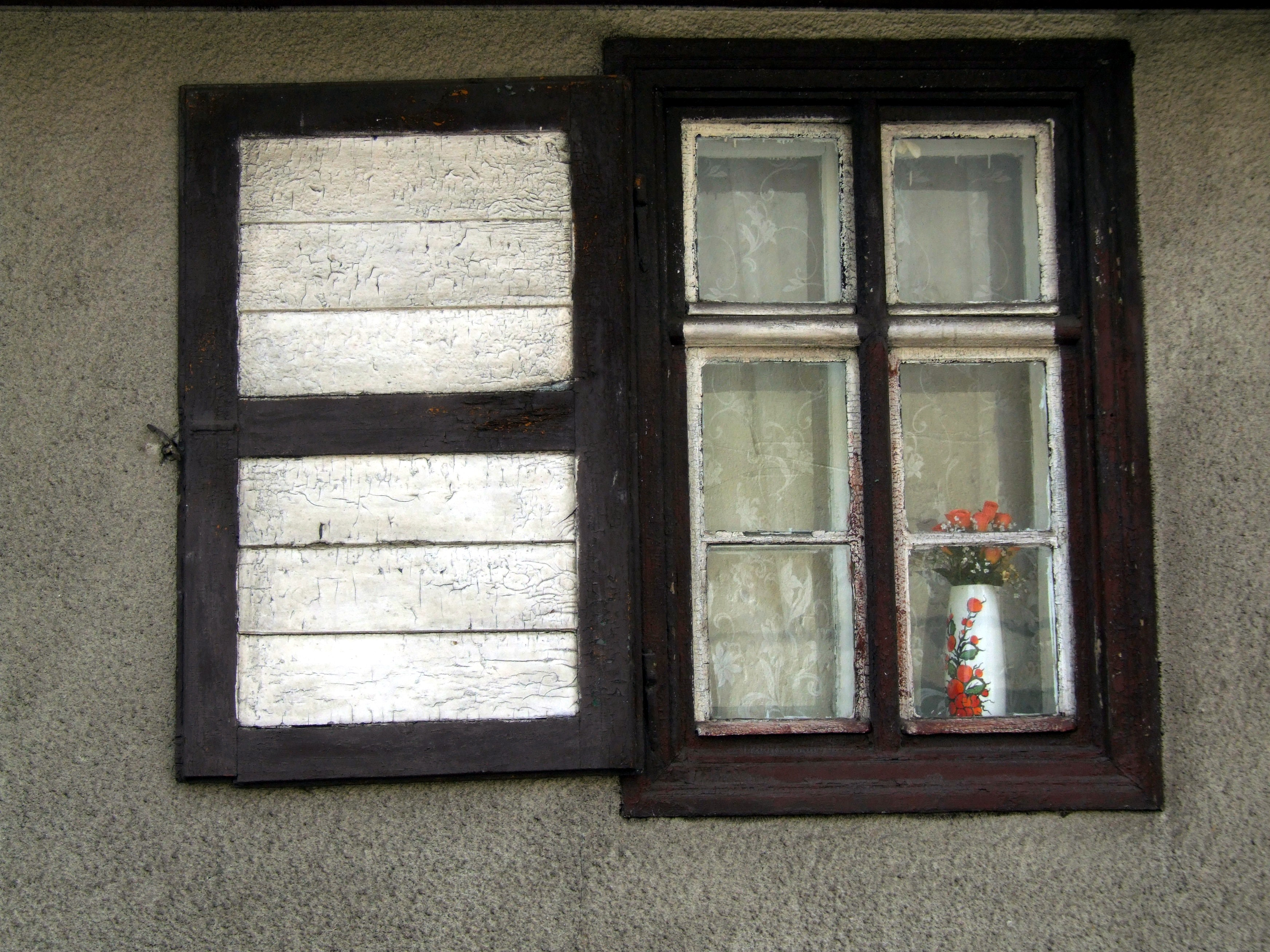
One side shutters in Poland

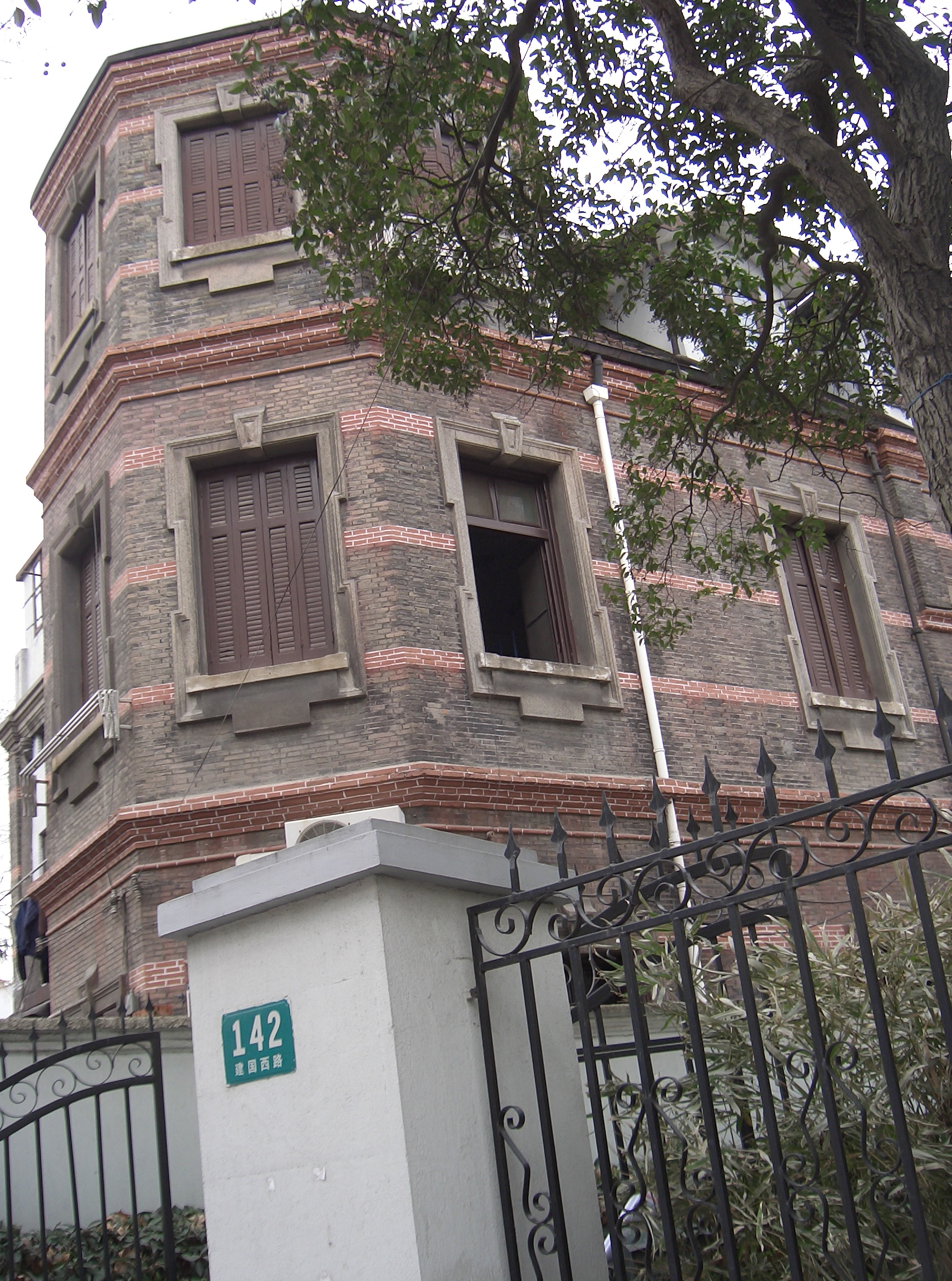
Shutters are frequently seen in French-influenced architecture.

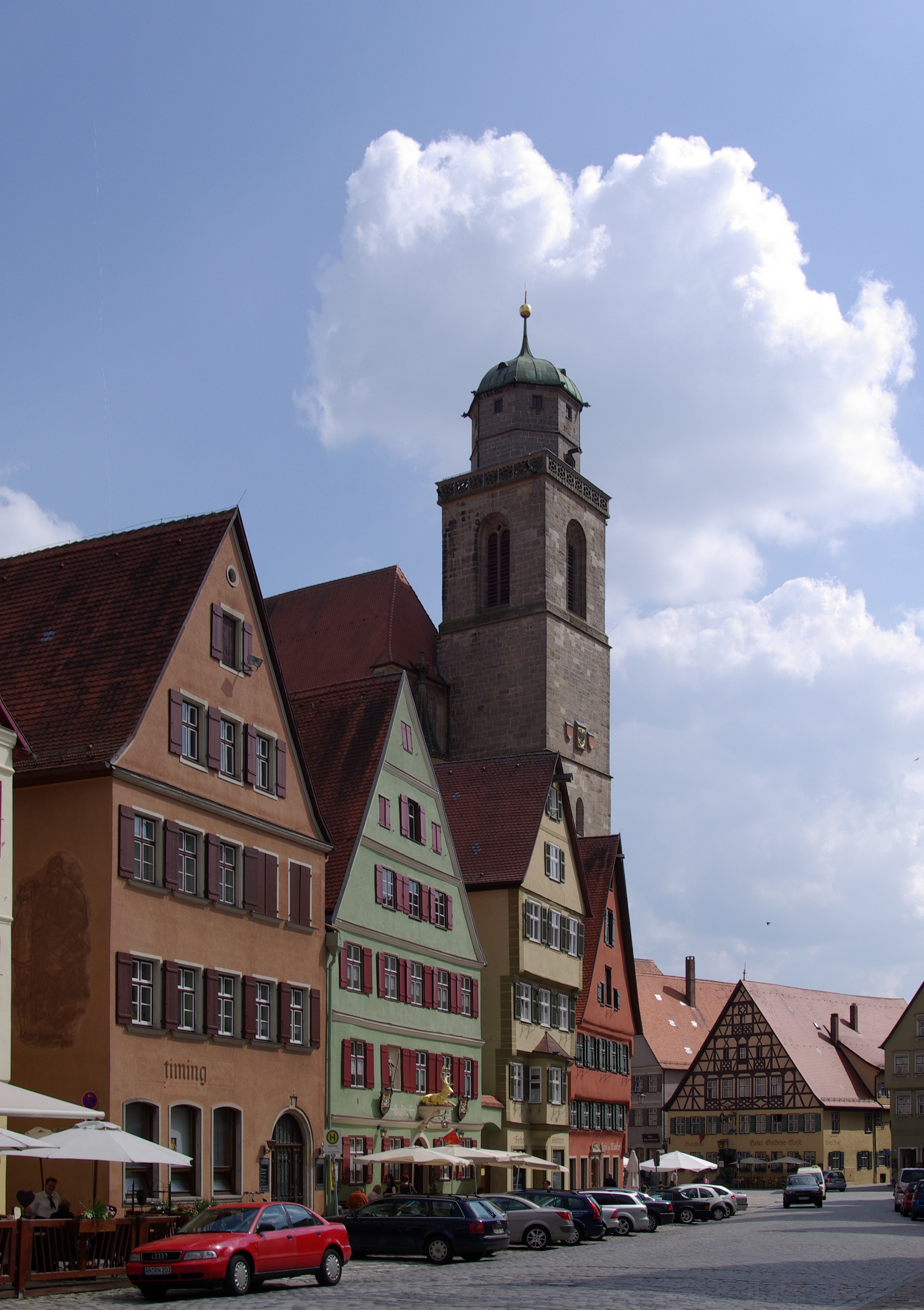
The old town of Dinkelsbühl, Germany, completely consists of houses with colored exterior shutters.

Exterior shutters were originally constructed for light control, privacy, security and protection from the elements. Many areas of tropical Australia, the Mediterranean, Africa, and the American South, feature exterior shutters that block the strong sun from windows. Functional shutters hinge on each side of a window or at the top and swing closed when necessary and can also be mounted on tracks applied to the face of the building.

Fixed and operable louvers shed rain, allow air transfer, filter direct sunlight, protect from small flying debris, and provide privacy. Operable louvered shutters allow for greater control of light and ventilation. Solid panels and board-and-batten shutters are generally used for security or protection during severe weather. Non-functional shutters are merely used to enhance the appearance of a building.

Functional shutters have traditionally been constructed from solid woods that have proven to endure outside elements but have also been mass-produced in woods less suitable to the outdoors like pine. Finishing wood shutters is recommended for extended life. Composite shutters offer advantages over wood shutters such as resistance to twisting, splitting, and rotting. However, PVC shutters are often hinged with three or more hinges and painted with vinyl-safe paint to keep from bowing in the sun and can require additional hardware. Fiberglass shutters are more dimensionally stable than PVC.

Certain hardwoods currently used for exterior shutters, specifically Spanish cedar, Honduran mahogany and teak, are resistant to rot and decay, and far more durable than a softer wood like untreated pine. Because of the tannin in these woods they are also not prone to problems from insects. Pressure treatment with wood preservative makes pine, cedar and other types of wood suitable for exterior shutters.

Non-functional exterior shutters can be constructed from wood, vinyl, fiberglass or other synthetic materials. Non-functional shutters can be simply screwed or bolted directly to the building, with spacers or other hardware to prevent water accumulating against the wall. Fiberglass, a material widely used for boat hulls, is not prone to rotting or twisting, is dimensionally stable and has low expansion and contraction. It is a reinforced plastic, unlike vinyl or PVC, so fiberglass shutters do not have a tendency to warp or sag. Its strength is comparable to aluminum; however, it does not suffer from corrosion and electrolysis.

Exterior shutters in France, notably in Paris, are frequently made of steel and are configured in multiple narrow full-length panels, allowing them to fold open and fit inconspicuously against the recesses at the sides of the window. Some exterior shutters in Italy, such as in towns along the Adriatic coast, slide on rollers into pockets in the wall at each side of the window.

In Germany and other parts of Europe, rolling exterior shutters on tracks (de) have become ubiquitous. When open, these type shutters roll up into boxes concealed in the thickness of the wall above the window. They are typically raised and lowered manually, such as by a rolling pull made of flat nylon cord, but they can be equipped with electric operating mechanisms. These shutters allow some light in the room when not fully lowered, but wholly block light when completely closed. Variations include frame extensions that allow the closed shutter to swing out like an awning or Bermuda shutter.

An exterior hurricane shutter or storm shutter is used to protect windows and doors in a building against the effects of high winds, rain, and flying objects during a hurricane, or as a security shutter over an opening. They can be made of a variety of materials such as fiberglass, steel, aluminum, wood or composite wood and can be installed in tracks to be quickly opened and closed manually or with motorized controls. There are also high-impact-resistant plastics that can be applied to new or existing wood shutters that provide hurricane protection.

== See also ==
- Robotic window cleaner
- Roller shutter
- Window blind
- Window treatment
- Window shutter hardware
