= Arsène Lacarrière-Latour =

French architect and civil engineer (1778–1837)

- Born: October 13, 1778
- Died: December 31, 1837 (aged 59); Saint-Mamet-la-Salvetat
- Occupations: Architect and civil engineer

Arsène Lacarrière-Latour (born in Aurillac in 1778 and died in Saint-Mamet-la-Salvetat in 1837) was a French architect. He spent most of his career in the Americas and served as an engineer during the War of 1812.

== Biography ==
Son of Lieutenant-General Guillaume de Lacarrière de la Tour de Falhiès, he came from a family of magistrates. He married Marie-Caroline de Montal in Aurillac, with whom he had two children.

After studying at the Académie royale d'architecture in Paris, Arsène Lacarrière-Latour embarked for the French part of the island of Saint-Domingue (Haiti) to oversee his family's properties. From 1791, the country was in the grip of violent fighting following the slave uprising which turned into a revolution. Bonaparte then decided to send an armed expedition to regain control of the island. Arsène Lacarrière-Latour was appointed engineer officer. After the defeat of the French army commanded by Donatien-Marie-Joseph de Rochambeau (son of the Count of Rochambeau, Marshal of France, the hero of the American Revolutionary War) he relocated to the United States, first in New York in 1804, where he became friends with Edward Livingston, an American politician, and brother of the diplomat Robert R. Livingston, signatory in Paris of the treaty of the Louisiana Purchase by the United States from France.

When Benjamin Henry Latrobe arrived in New Orleans in 1808, he wrote that it was the most beautiful city in the United States. The style of New Orleans French architecture had been set by both Latour and Jean-Hyacinthe Laclotte. An important architect in New Orleans, Louisiana (where he accompanied Livingston), he was also in 1810 the founding urban planner of the city of Baton Rouge, the future capital of the state. Although Laclotte and Latour dissolved their business partnership in 1813, the following year Nicolas Girod hired them to transform his property that later became known as the Napoleon House

He participated in the War of 1812 under the leadership of General Andrew Jackson, as a Field rank engineer officer (1814-1815). He was recommended to Jackson by Edward Livingston. Latour credits himself with undertaking a reconnaissance, providing this information to Jackson, resulting in a pre-emptive strike against the British which saved New Orleans, by consequence of delaying the British advance and allowing further time to be spent on the construction of Line Jackson. In 1816, he published his war memoirs, that were translated into English, which are still read today. His blatantly anglophobic commentary was criticised by the writer William James, (Note: 'Major Latour, palpably ridiculous as his statements are') who himself was criticized for his non-impartiality in subsequent years by Roosevelt. (Note: Theodore Roosevelt commented: "Latour is the only trustworthy American contemporary historian of this war, and even he at times absurdly exaggerates the British force and loss, Most of the other American 'histories' of that period were the most preposterously bombastic works that ever saw print. But as regards this battle, none of them are as bad as even such British historians as Alison. ... The devices each author adopts to lessen the seeming force of his side are generally of much the same character. For instance, [at New Orleans] Latour says that 800 of Jackson's men were employed on works at the rear, on guard duty, etc., and deducts them; James, for precisely similar reasons, deducts 553 men. ... Almost all British writers underestimate their own force and enormously magnify that of the Americans.")

Having become Major Latour, he relocated to Philadelphia, where he found himself within the entourage of French exiles from the Premier Empire gathered around Joseph Bonaparte, General Charles Lallemand whom he had known well in Haiti. Together they drew up the project for the settlement of Champ d'Asile, in Texas. Lacarrière-Latour's advice was not followed by Lallemand, and it was a failure in 1818. Nonetheless, their friendship would last until Latour's death. The architect would meet not only three presidents of the United States (James Madison, James Monroe and Andrew Jackson) but also the famous buccaneers, the Lafitte brothers. He would conspire with Jean Lafitte and Mexican independence fighters to devise mysterious missions in the west, without it being known whether it was on behalf of the American president (Monroe), or that of the Spanish ambassador Luis de Onis. As one of the "men of the Enlightenment", Latour appears as a multi-talented character of considerable skills.

From 1817 onwards, he was an architect in Havana and an advisor to the Spanish authorities in Cuba. His important reports - remarkable and visionary - reached King Ferdinand VII of Spain.

Returning to France after 1830, he met up with his children and his friend Charles Lallemand, who had since been appointed a peer of France and the governor of Corsica.

He died in 1837 in his native province of Saint-Mamet-la-Salvetat, in Cantal.

== Achievements ==
- Urban planner of Baton Rouge, which, today, is the capital of Louisiana.
- Several private and public buildings in New Orleans, including a market hall and a theater
- Bridges, aqueduct, street development, introduction of the first steam engines to Havana,

== Bibliography ==
- Carpenter, Edwin H. (May 1938). "Arsène Lacarrière Latour". The Hispanic American Historical Review. 18 (2): 221–227. doi:10.1215/00182168-18.2.221. JSTOR 2507195.
- Clermont, Guy (September 2018). "Arsène Lacarrière Latour" (PDF). Bulletin de la Société d'Histoire de la Guadeloupe (in French) (181): 87–109. doi:10.7202/1056377ar. ISSN 2276-1993.
- Garrigoux, Jean (2017) [1997]. Un Aventurier visionnaire: Lacarrière-Latour, 1778-1837 : l'étrange parcours d'un Français aux Amériques [A Visionary Adventurer: Arsène Lacarrière Latour 1778-1837, the Unusual Travels of a Frenchman in the Americas]. Translated from French into English by Gordon S. Brown. Lafayette, LA: University of Louisiana at Lafayette Press. ISBN 978-1-935754-93-0.
- James, William (1818), A full and correct account of the military occurrences of the late war between Great Britain and the United States of America; with an appendix, and plates. Volume II, London: Printed for the author and distributed by Black et al., ISBN 0-665-35743-5, OCLC 2226903
- Latour, Arsène Lacarrière (1816). Historical Memoir of the War in West Florida and Louisiana in 1814–15, with an Atlas. Translated from French into English by H.P. Nugent. Philadelphia: John Conrad and Co. OCLC 40119875.
- Roosevelt, Theodore (1900). The Naval War of 1812. Vol. II. Annapolis: Naval Institute Press.
- ""A Little Sharp Looking Frenchman" and his Battle of New Orleans" (PDF). The Historic New Orleans Collection Quarterly. XVI (1): 2–6. Winter 1998.
