= Battle of New Orleans order of battle: British =

British Forces, North America
- Active: 1814–1815
- Country: United Kingdom of Great Britain and Ireland
- Allegiance: George III
- Branch: British army
- Type: Army
- Size: 5,933 effectives out of a headcount of 6,660 soldiers (25 December 1814); 8,000 participants on 8 January 1815; 6,334 effectives (25 January 1815)
- Engagements: Battle of New Orleans

Commanders
- Commander-in-chief (23 December 1814 – 24 December 1814): Major General John Keane
- Commander-in-chief (25 December 1814 – 8 January 1815): Major General Edward Pakenham
- Commander-in-chief (8 January 1815 - 13 February 1815 ): Major General John Lambert

The following units of the British Armed Forces participated in the Battle of New Orleans on 8 January 1815. The American order of battle is shown separately.

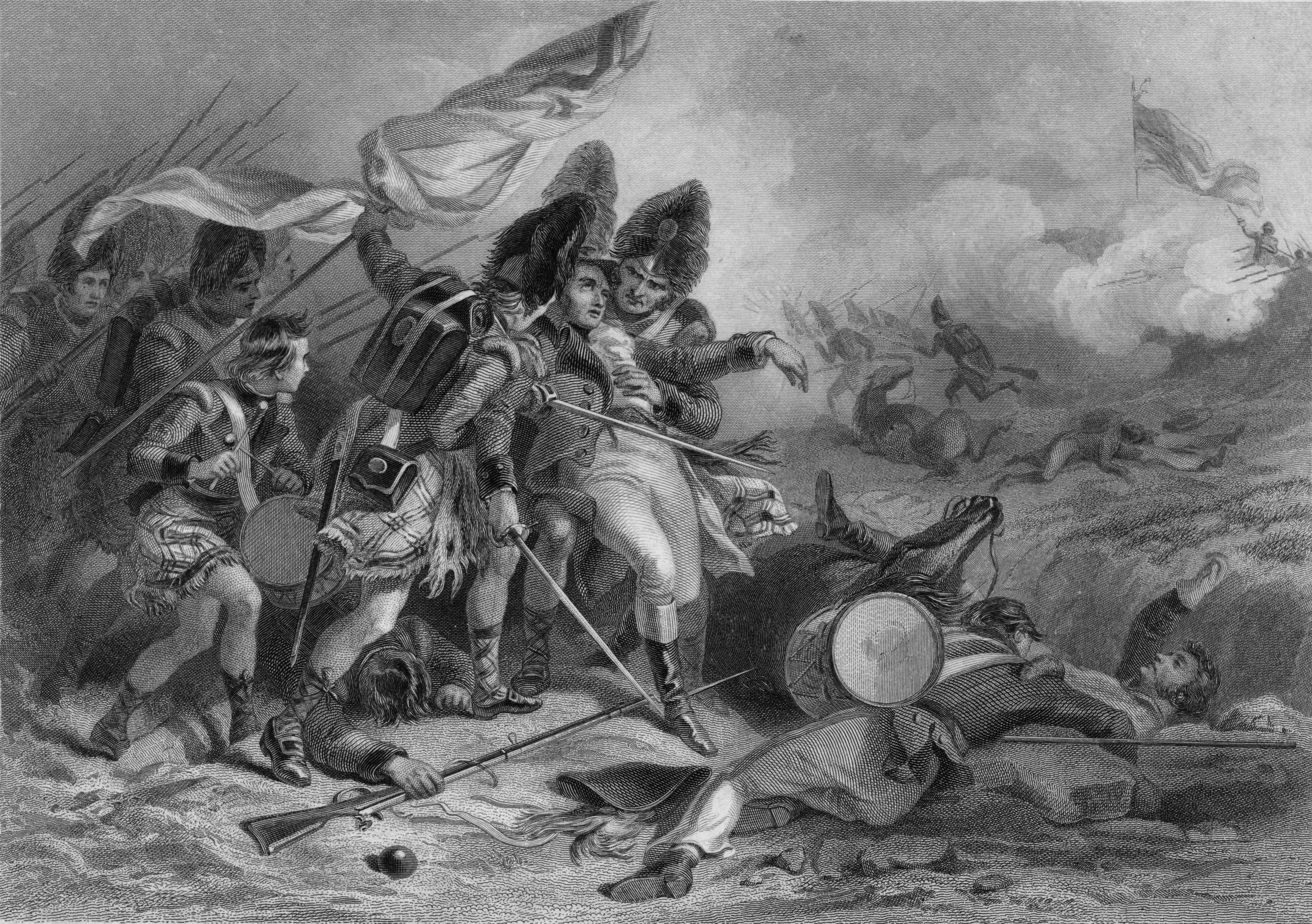
The Death of Pakenham at the Battle of New Orleans by F. O. C. Darley shows the death of British Maj. Gen. Sir Edward Pakenham on 8 January 1815. This romanticised portrayal, dating from 1860, has British soldiers wearing Bearskin caps, a headdress not worn since the American Revolutionary War

== British order of battle ==
=== British Army ===
Source: (Note: One useful document is the one page 'Journal of the movements of the Army acting in the Southern part of the North American coast.' It contains a list of units and their strengths as at 25 November 1814. This, a one page "Plan of the Position we occupied" and Major Forrest's journal were sent with a covering letter to Lieutenant General Clinton by Lieutenant John Peddie. They were discovered in the Clinton Papers held by the University of Michigan. As well as a transcription of the 'Journal of the movements of the Army' a reproduction of the image can be seen via this link. This source was also quoted in Duncan's book in 1873. The same information is recorded in the monthly returns for British forces in North America, archive reference WO 17/1218.)

==== General Staff ====
- Commander-in-Chief: Major General the honourable Sir Edward Pakenham - killed 8 January 1815
- Deputy Commander-in-Chief: Major General Samuel Gibbs - died of wounds
- Military Secretary: Major Harry Smith
- Deputy Adjutant General: Lieutenant Colonel Frederick Stovin - wounded 24 December 1814
- Deputy Assistant Adjutant General: Brevet Major Henry Hooper - wounded 24 December 1814
- Acting Deputy Adjutant General: Captain Sir John Maxwell Tylden
- Acting Deputy Assistant Adjutant General: Captain Wood
- Senior Officer, Royal Artillery: Lieutenant Colonel Alexander Dickson
- Senior Officer, Royal Engineers: Lieutenant Colonel John Fox Burgoyne
- Senior Officer, Royal Staff Corps: Major Todd.
- Major of Brigade: Captain Henry Thomas Shaw (4th Foot) - wounded 8 January 1815
- Major of Brigade: Captain Thomas Wilkinson (85th Foot)- killed 8 January 1815
- Quarter Master General: Lieutenant Colonel John Bell (Note: In addition to Bell's service in the Peninsular War, it documents that he 'served afterwards with the army employed against Louisiana, from Dec. 1814 to June 1815', as documented in the "War Services of the General Officers")
- Assistant Quarter Master General: Major Charles Ramus Forrest
- Deputy Assistant Quarter Master General: Lieutenant George de Lacy Evans - wounded on 24 December 1814 and 8 January 1815
- Deputy Assistant Quarter Master General: Lieutenant John Peddie.
- Naval aide de camp: Lieutenant (RN) The Honourable Edward Curzon
- Deputy Inspector of hospitals: Dr John Robb

==== Infantry Brigades ====
Brigade	Unit	Comments
1st Brigade, Major General John Keane - wounded 8 January 1815	* 1st Battalion, 93rd Regiment of Foot	907 men as at 25 November 1814. Effective strength of 850 out of a headcount of 862 as at 25 December. Casualties 23 to 31 December: 2 killed, 6 wounded. Casualties 1 to 5 January: 9 killed; 11 wounded. 775 ORs on 8 January according to Major Pringle's letter. Casualties 8 January: 63 killed; 101 wounded. Effective strength of 331 out of a headcount of 673 as at 25 January 1815, 78 deaths since the prior monthly return. (Note: The monthly returns for British forces in North America, archive reference WO 17/1218, prepared on the 25th day of the month, provide valuable details on unit strengths. Images of the original documents can be seen on microfilm at The Historic New Orleans Collection's research center. Transcriptions of the returns can be downloaded)
1st Brigade, Major General John Keane - wounded 8 January 1815	* 1 battalion of the 1st West India Regiment.	Effective strength of 755 out of a headcount of 809 as at 25 December. Casualties 25 to 31 December: 1 killed. Casualties 8 January: 5 killed; 23 wounded; 1 missing. Morrell estimated a strength of 700 men. (Note: Estimate of 'British Army Corps and Strength' & 'Staff of the British Army' by Robert Morrell, M.D. formerly a prisoner of the British, letter dated 8 April 1815. These attachments were sent in a letter from Morrell to Major Latour, and are reproduced in the Report of Sesquicentennial Celebration 1815-1865) Effective strength of 675 out of a headcount of 787 as at 25 January 1815, 22 deaths since the prior month.
1st Brigade, Major General John Keane - wounded 8 January 1815	* 1 battalion of the 5th West India Regiment.	643 men as at 25 November 1814. Effective strength of 570 out of a headcount of 585 as at 25 December. Casualties 25 to 31 December: 1 killed, 2 wounded. Casualties 25 to 31 December: 4 killed, 2 wounded. Casualties 8 January: 1 wounded. Effective strength of 439 out of a headcount of 569 as at 25 January 1815, 19 deaths since the prior month.
2nd Brigade, Major General Samuel Gibbs, succeeded by Colonel Arthur Brooke	* 1 battalion of the 4th Regiment of Foot.	893 men as at 25 November 1814. Effective strength of 802 out of a headcount of 916 as at 25 December. Casualties 23 to 24 December: 5 killed; 15 wounded. Casualties 25 to 31 December: 4 wounded. 747 ORs on 8 January according to Major Pringle's letter. Casualties 8 January: 42 killed; 254 wounded; 55 missing. Effective strength of 512 out of a headcount of 793 as at 25 January 1815, 56 deaths since the prior monthly return.
2nd Brigade, Major General Samuel Gibbs, succeeded by Colonel Arthur Brooke	* 1 battalion of the 44th Regiment of Foot.	647 men as at 25 November 1814. Effective strength of 552 out of a headcount of 692 as at 25 December. Casualties 25 to 31 December: 2 wounded; 1 missing. Casualties 1 to 5 January: 2 killed; 3 wounded. 427 ORs on 8 January according to Major Pringle's letter. Casualties 8 January: 35 killed; 163 wounded; 80 missing. Effective strength of 286 out of a headcount of 565 as at 25 January 1815, 46 deaths since the prior month.
2nd Brigade, Major General Samuel Gibbs, succeeded by Colonel Arthur Brooke	* 1 battalion of the 21st Regiment of Foot	995 men as at 25 November 1814. Effective strength of 873 out of a headcount of 1010 as at 25 December. Casualties 23 to 24 December: 3 killed; 11 wounded; 8 missing. Casualties 25 to 31 December: 1 killed, 1 wounded. Casualties 1 to 5 January: 1 killed; 5 wounded. 800 ORs on 8 January according to Major Pringle's letter. Casualties 8 January: 70 killed; 155 wounded; 236 missing. Effective strength of 482 out of a headcount of 709 as at 25 January 1815, 75 deaths since the prior month.
2nd Brigade, Major General Samuel Gibbs, succeeded by Colonel Arthur Brooke	* 12 man detachment of the 1st battalion of the 62nd Regiment of Foot	Effective strength of 12 out of a headcount of 12 as at 25 December. Effective strength of 12 out of a headcount of 12 as at 25 January 1815.
Advance Brigade, Colonel William Thornton - wounded 'severely (not dangerously)'	* 1 battalion of the 85th Regiment of Foot who participated in the attack on the west bank of the Mississippi.	456 men as at 25 November 1814. Effective strength of 345 out of a headcount of 471 as at 25 December. Casualties 23 to 24 December: 13 killed; 69 wounded; 19 missing. Casualties 25 to 31 December: 4 killed; 13 wounded. Casualties 1 to 5 January: 2 killed; 6 wounded. 298 ORs on 8 January according to Major Pringle's letter. Casualties 8 January: 2 killed; 41 wounded; 1 missing. Casualties 9 to 26 January: 1 wounded. Effective strength of 265 out of a headcount of 430 as at 25 January 1815, 25 deaths since the prior monthly return.
Advance Brigade, Colonel William Thornton - wounded 'severely (not dangerously)'	* 5 companies of the 3rd battalion from 95th Regiment of Foot.	They disembarked at Bayou Catalan on 22 December 1814, having departed Plymouth, Devon on 18 September 1814. Effective strength of 317 out of a headcount of 395 as at 25 December. Casualties 23 to 24 December: 23 killed; 62 wounded; 42 missing. Casualties 1 to 5 January: 1 killed. 296 ORs on 8 January according to Major Pringle's letter. Casualties 8 January: 11 killed; 101 wounded. Effective strength of 200 out of a headcount of 345 as at 25 January 1815, 32 deaths since the prior monthly return.
Advance Brigade, Colonel William Thornton - wounded 'severely (not dangerously)'	Sailors and Marines	See further down
Reinforcements from Europe (Note: The 7th and the 43rd were to go to Georgia to assist, but were diverted to New Orleans, unbeknown to Read Admiral Cochrane) (Note: Despatch from Bathust to Pakenham dated 24 October 1814, within: Secretary of State for War and the Colonies, Out-letters, archive reference WO 6/2. 'You will be followed immediately by the 7th and 43rd Regiments with another squadron of dismounted Dragoons, which are embarked at Plymouth under Major General Lambert, and by the 40th Regiment from Cork. The 2nd West India Regiment has also been ordered to join you from Barbadoes.')- Both battalions commanded by Major General John Lambert	* 1 battalion of the 7th Regiment of Foot.	Effective strength of 887 out of a headcount of 887 whilst at sea as at 25 October 1814. 800 men as at 5 January 1815. 750 ORs on 8 January according to Major Pringle's letter. Casualties 8 January: 49 killed; 53 wounded. Effective strength of 681 out of a headcount of 812 as at 25 January 1815, 58 deaths since the prior month.
Reinforcements from Europe - Both battalions commanded by Major General John Lambert	* 1 battalion of the 43rd Regiment of Foot	Effective strength of 991 out of a headcount of 991 whilst at sea as at 25 October 1814. 900 men as at 5 January 1815. 820 ORs on 8 January according to Major Pringle's letter. Casualties 8 January: 11 killed; 163 wounded; 44 missing. Casualties 9 to 26 January: 1 killed; 5 wounded. Effective strength of 785 out of a headcount of 907 as at 25 January 1815, 13 deaths since the prior month.
Reinforcements from Europe - Both battalions commanded by Major General John Lambert	* Dismounted troopers of the 14th Light Dragoons.	160 men as at 25 November 1814. Soon joined by a second squadron, the unit having a strength of 295 as at 8 January 1815. Effective strength of 261 out of a headcount of 277 as at 25 January 1815. No casualties during battle, but 2 officers and 37 troopers in a boat were captured on 25 January 1815. Effective strength of 214 out of a headcount of 275 as at 25 February 1815.

==== Artillery and supporting elements ====
Service	Composition	Comments
Artillery	Three companies of Royal Artillery each commanded by Captain John Michell, Captain Lewis Carmichael and Captain Adam Crawford, redeployed from the Chesapeake (320 men). Now joined by a fourth company commanded by Major Alexander Munro of 115 men and a rocket detachment of 40 men commanded by Captain Henry Lane. Colonel Alexander Dickson accompanied these reinforcements.	Effective strength of 381 gunners & 216 drivers out of a headcount of 649 as at 25 November 1814. Effective strength of 610 out of a headcount of 646 as at 25 December. Casualties 23 to 24 December: 2 ORs killed; 1 Officer, 7 ORs wounded. Casualties 25 to 31 December: 4 ORs killed; 1 Officer, 5 ORs wounded. Casualties 1 to 5 January: 1 Officer 1 NCOs & 9 ORs killed; 12 ORs wounded. Casualties 8 January: 5 ORs killed; 10 ORs wounded. Effective strength of 581 out of a headcount of 625 as at 25 January 1815, 19 deaths since the prior month.
* Royal Engineers	Effective strength of 101 out of a headcount of 109 as at 25 December. Company of sappers with a strength of nearly 100 men, confirmed as 98 men on 8 January.	Casualties 23 to 24 December: 1 OR missing. Casualties 25 to 31 December: 1 OR wounded. Casualties 1 to 5 January: 1 Officer killed. Casualties 8 January: 3 ORs wounded. Effective strength of 94 out of a headcount of 109 as at 25 January 1815, zero deaths since the prior month.
Royal Staff Corps detachment of 57 men as at 8 January on shore, no source material to indicate whether they participated in the battle.	Effective strength of 57 out of a headcount of 57 whilst at sea as at 25 October 1814. Effective strength of 29 out of a headcount of 57 as at 25 January 1815, zero deaths since the prior month.	

=== Royal Navy ===
Composition	Comments
Sailors from the fleet	Naval Brigade of 100 sailors from the fleet, in combat, commanded by Rowland Money of HMS Trave, who participated in the attack on the west bank of the Mississippi. Casualties 8 January: Royal Navy casualties were two dead, Captain Rowland Money and 18 seamen wounded.
* Royal Marines - Infantry	Composite battalion of 100 marines from the fleet, in combat, commanded by Brevet Major Thomas Adair, who led the attack by the Royal Marines on the west bank of the Mississippi at New Orleans. Casualties 8 January: Royal Marine casualties were two dead, with three officers, one sergeant, and 12 other ranks wounded.
* Royal Marines - Gunners	Royal Marine Artillery rocket detachment from the marine battalion (elsewhere), commanded by Lieutenant John Lawrence. The Marine Artillery numbered 1 officer and 26 gunners. Their penultimate engagement was the Battle of New Orleans.

=== Native American allies ===
- Brevet Major Edward Nicolls accompanied by 'a handful' of Creek chiefs and their entourage. A diplomatic mission rather than a military mission, in order to meet the Commander-in-Chief, North American Station aboard his flagship Tonnant, and to witness the anticipated defeat of Jackson. Among them were the Hitchiti Indian chief Kinache. Their Creek allies had no participation in the battle. Although he was the most senior Royal Marine field officer, Vice Admiral Alexander Cochrane forbade Nicolls to take part in the fighting personally, fearing that mishap to Nicolls might deprive the British of their most competent officer serving with the Creeks and Seminoles.

== Notes and citations ==
Notes

Citations

== Bibliography ==
- Bourchier, Jane, ed. (1872). Memoir of the life of Admiral Sir Edward Codrington. With selections from his public & private correspondence. London: Longmans Green. OCLC 557819059.
- "British Army Unit Strengths: 1808-1815 War of 1812 - American Coast". archive reference WO 17/1218. The Napoleon Series. May 2014.
- Cope, William Henry (2008) [1877]. The History of the Rifle Brigade (the Prince Consort's Own) Formerly the 95th. Chatto & Windus. OCLC 1181525418 – via Google Books.
- Dickson, Alexander (1929) [1815]. John H Leslie (ed.). "Artillery services in North America in 1814 and 1815. Being extracts from "Journal of Operations in Louisiana, 1814 and 1815" by Sir Alexander Dickson". Journal of the Society for Army Historical Research. 8 (32): 79–85. JSTOR 44220284.
- Duncan, Francis (1873). History of the Royal Regiment of Artillery, Vol. 2. London: John Murray. OCLC 1113269120.
- Forrest, Charles Ramus (1961) [1815]. Hugh F. Rankin (ed.). The Battle of New Orleans: a British view; the journal of Major C.R. Forrest; Asst. QM General, 34th. Regiment of Foot. New Orleans: Hauser Press. OCLC 1253280.
- Fraser, Edward; Carr-Laughton, L. G. (1930). The Royal Marine Artillery 1804-1923, Volume 1 [1804-1859]. London: The Royal United Services Institution. OCLC 4986867.
- Grodzinski, John, ed. (September 2011). "Instructions to Major-General Sir Edward Pakenham for the New Orleans Campaign". The War of 1812 Magazine (16).
- Hart, H. G. (1848). "War Services of the General Officers". The New Annual Army List for 1848. London: John Murray. p. 27. OCLC 1242929486.
- Hill, Benson Earle (1836). "Battle of the 8th of January". Recollections of an Artillery Officer, Vol. 2. London: Richard Bentley. OCLC 614334239.
- James, William (1818), A full and correct account of the military occurrences of the late war between Great Britain and the United States of America; with an appendix, and plates. Volume II, London: Black et al., OCLC 2226903
- Levinge, Richard (2009) [1868]. Historical Records of the 43rd Regiment Monmouthshire Light Infantry. Clowes. OCLC 866065464 – via Google Books.
- Lee, Sidney, ed. (1894). "Tylden, John Maxwell" . Dictionary of National Biography. Vol. 37. London: Smith, Elder & Co.
- Marshall, John (1831). "Curzon, Edward" . Royal Naval Biography. Vol. 3, part 1. London: Longman and Company. p. 68.
- Nicolas, Paul Harris (1845). Historical Record of the Royal Marine Forces, Volume 2 [1805–1842]. London: Thomas & William Boone. OCLC 758539027 – via Google Books.
- Owsley, Frank L. Jr. (2017) [1981]. Struggle for the Gulf Borderlands: The Creek War and the Battle of New Orleans, 1812–1815 (PDF). Gainesville: University Press of Florida. ISBN 978-0-8173-1062-2.
- Stuart, James (1834). Refutation of aspersions [by N. Pringle] on "Three Years in North America.". London: Whittaker & Co. OCLC 909227054.
- Surtees, William (2005) [1833]. Twenty-five years in the Rifle Brigade. William Blackwood. OCLC 1191238522 – via Google Books.
- Battle of New Orleans Sesquicentennial Celebration, 1815-1865 Final Report to the United States Congress. Washington: United States Government Publishing Office. 2009 [1966]. OCLC 1124630544 – via Google Books.
