= Window shutter hardware =

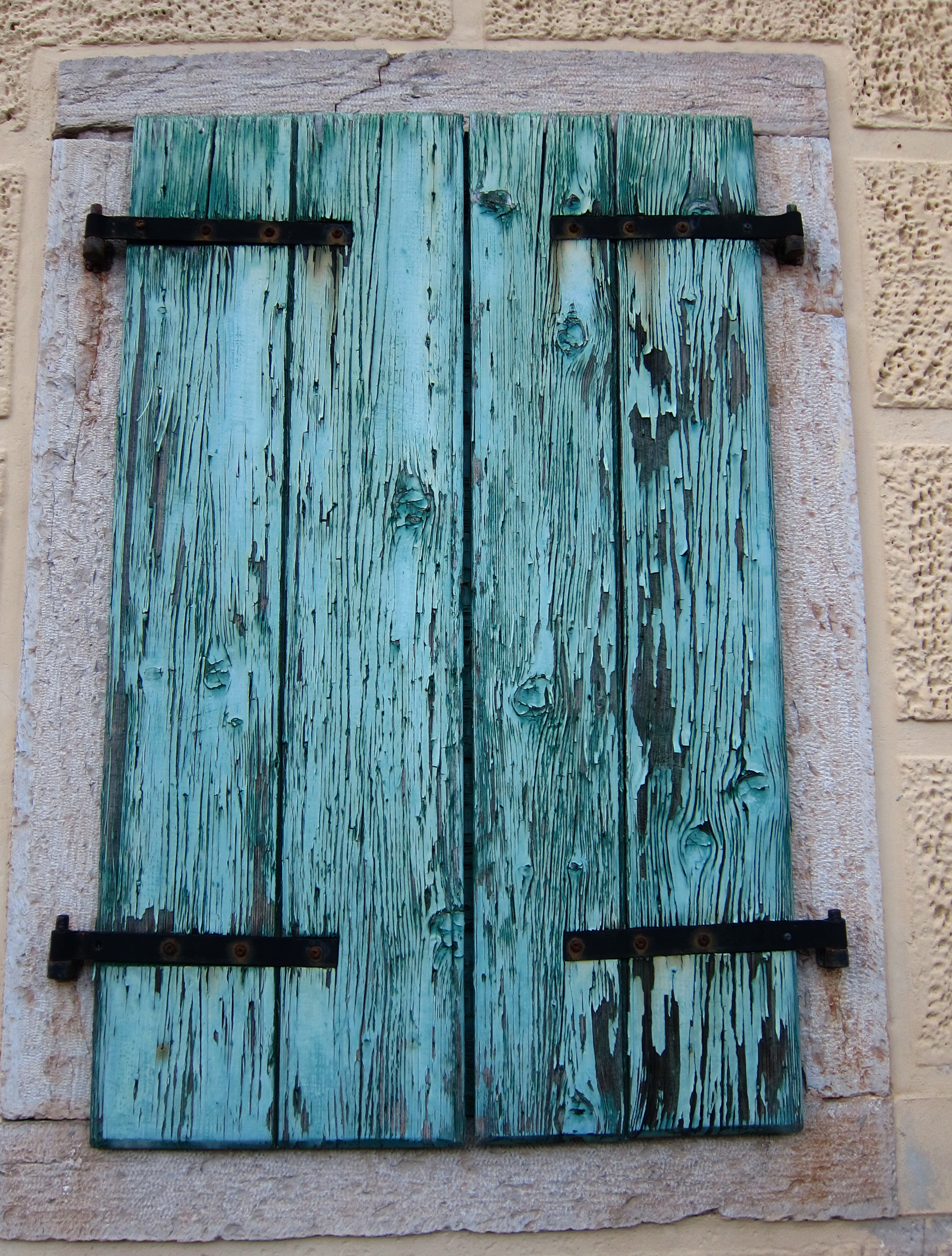
Window shutters of house in village Casso, province of Pordenone, Friuli, Italy showing strap hinges (2018-12-08)

Window shutter hardware, usually made of iron, are hinges and latches that attach to the shutter and a window frame (and in some cases directly attached to stone or brick). The hinges hold the shutter to the structure and allow the shutter to open and close over the window. The latches secure the shutter in the closed (over the window) position. Tie-back hardware can be used to hold the shutter in the open position.

Exterior shutters were vital elements of homes in the colonies. Raised panel shutters provided security against access from ground level. Exterior shutters also proved a first barrier against the elements. In cities, shutters provided privacy screens for the residents. Louvered upstairs shutters were often later additions to the home.

This article describes the evolution of early exterior window shutter hardware, terms and terminology related to shutter hardware and blacksmithing, and American regional styles of installation.

== History ==
=== Early hardware ===
In its earliest forms, most hardware was simple and hand-made – usually of readily available materials such as wood or leather. A patch of leather spanning between the stile and jamb and fastened with wooden pegs served to hinge a door or shutter. Hand-carved wooden hinges and pintles, slide bolts and lift-latches were whittled from a variety of woods.

The earliest examples of iron hardware were sponsored by the nobility. Iron itself was expensive and a valued resource for any kingdom and had many other more valuable uses in weaponry and tools.

In the post-Renaissance period industrial advances provided more iron and the emerging merchant/tradesman classes had money to purchase hardware for their homes and warehouses. Examples of hardware excavated from the Jamestown and Plymouth colonies of the 17th century were very ornate in design – typical of that being produced in England at the time.

In Colonial America, hardware was made in England and imported to the colonies. It was illegal for the colonials to produce manufactured goods. America sold iron and charcoal to the British, who used those raw materials and their resident labor force to produce hardware which was then sold back to the captive market in the colonies. Virtually all of the early hardware in New York, Philadelphia, Annapolis, Alexandria, Key West, or anyplace else where British ships could berth, was made in England. Away from the ports and cities where British authority was centered, many locally made examples of early hardware can be found. Examples of German, French, and Dutch hardware remain in the inland river valleys – the homelands of the early settlers. English hardware, however, was the overwhelming standard in colonial America and set the pattern for all that evolved.

Virtually all of the shutters in colonial times were hung with strap hinges – following the examples in Britain. Strap hinges were strong and secure. The frames of windows were hewn from a single heavy piece of wood into which a heavy pintle could be driven. The rails of the shutter were often six or eight inches high and provided room to position the strap hinge across most of the width of the shutter. The hinges were fastened to the shutters with rivets or nails driven through and clinched on the inside of the closed shutter. Locks of the period followed the form of the strap hinges. The rolled barrel was replaced by a pin of about 1/2" in diameter and twice the length of the thickness of the shutter mounted perpendicular to the face of the lock. The lock would be nailed or riveted on the lock rail of one shutter with the pin positioned about two inches beyond the edge of the shutter. The opposite shutter would be drilled through with a hole to accept the pin protruding from the lock.

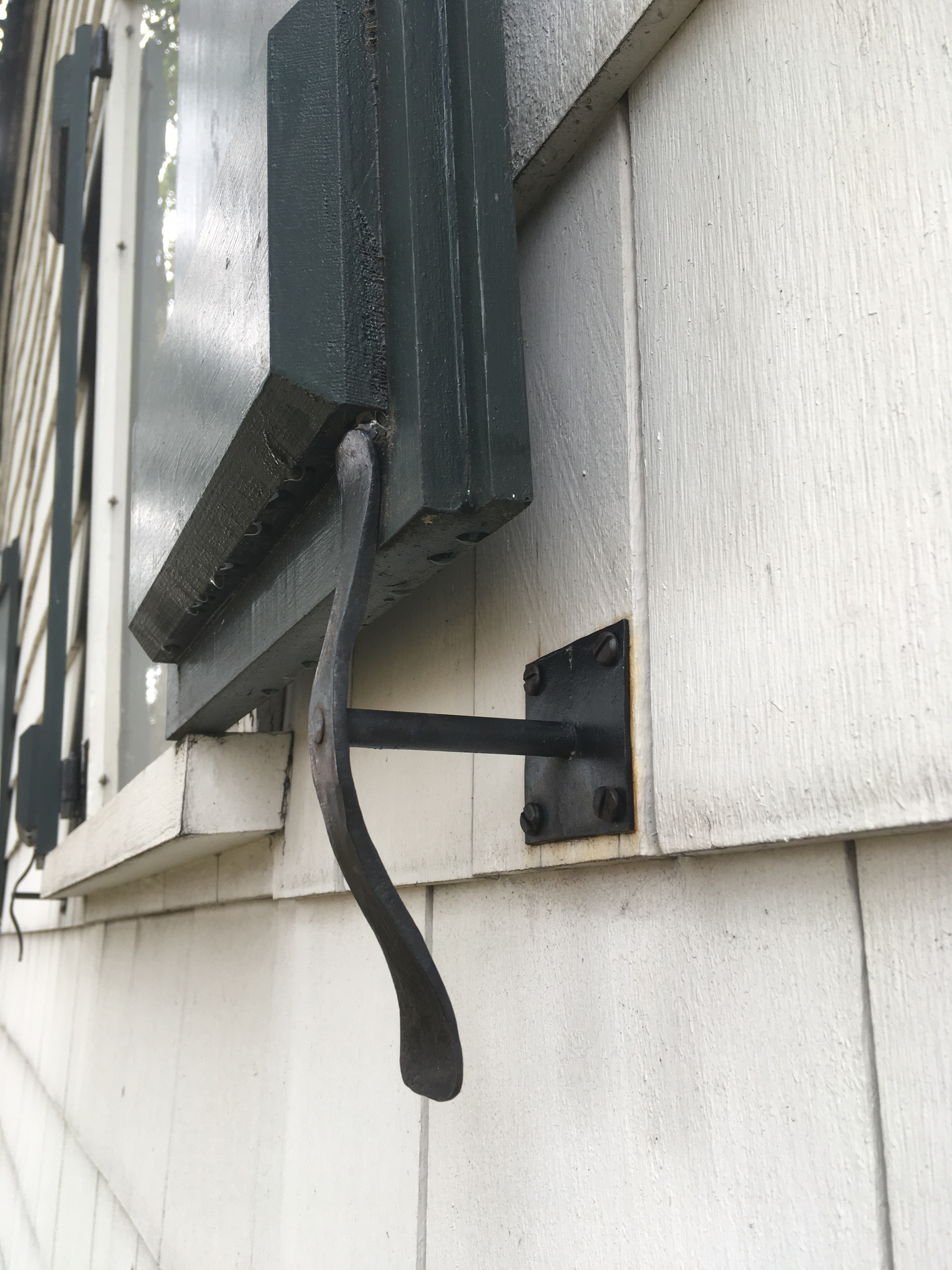
Shutter tieback holding a window shutter open. Edgar Allan Poe Cottage.

To close and secure the shutter: from the inside close the shutter with the hole then close the shutter with the lock. The lock pin passes through the hole and the user drops a simple nail-like key into the hole in the lock pin. The shutter is virtually impregnable from the exterior.

Tie-backs of the Colonial era were mostly of English origin and many were of the "Rattail" style. Variations are noted as different British manufacturers vied to produce a less expensive product. Inland, where local smiths were producing hardware on their own, a wide range of patterns have been noted.

=== Shutter hardware and the Industrial Revolution ===
Around 1750, colonial raw materials poured into the British Isles, and factories began to appear. The earlier hardware with its chiseled and filed details fast gave way to less expensive, but equally functional hardware of similar but unadorned design. H and HL hinges are a good example of this transition.

After the American Revolution machines were invented to make screws and to produce rolled iron in thin sheets. By about 1800 cheap screws were readily available. Cast iron technology had long been available – now machine-made screws allowed such hardware to be economically mounted. Butt type hinges can be seen during this "Federal" Period (1800–1830) – but they quickly fell from favor, probably because they were subject to breakage.

A more obvious change in the shutter hardware was noted in shutter bolts. The common slide plate and keeper style of bolt started to appear. It was simpler to fabricate and operate than the earlier "strap style lock". This bolt relied on both the new cheap fasteners and the readily available plate iron. This bolt also relied on machines and "dies." This form of shutter bolt has been made continually ever since.

Strap hinges continued to dominate in the marketplace for hanging shutters. Drive pintles started to be replaced by similar pintles cut off and mounted on a piece of thin plate material and again fastened with the new screws. This is the precursor of the "plate pintle".

Changes in construction have been noted in the same period. Structures were built with openings into which pre-fabricated windows were installed. The earliest examples date from around 1810 and used a variation on the strap hinge. Instead of mounting the pintle to the surface of the structure, a new form was designed. This pintle was a flat plate of about two inches high and notched to one half of its height and formed to a female barrel. Holes were punched in the side of the pintle, and it was screwed directly to the side of the window before the window was installed on the structure. The strap hinges were modified to match the new pintles and the hinge was of the same width as the pintle and notched to one half of its height. A pin to mate with the female pintle was welded in the hinge. Examples of this type proved to be very durable and were in regular and widespread use through the 1870s.

Often when the shutters were removed – usually in the 20th century – cast type pintles were hit with a hammer and broken off flush with the edge of the window. The shutters often found their way into the basements of the home to provide coal bins for newly installed central heat or were nailed up in the barn to partition off pig sties or calf pens.

Cast iron tie-backs became much more popular during the Federal period – usually mounted on arms extending from the window sills. The "Federal Shell" was the dominant pattern in this period.

=== The American Civil War Era and beyond ===
The next major change in shutter hardware coincided with the American Civil War era. Heavy presses and punches were in use in factories around the country and a maturing rail transportation system opened inland areas for the products of the factories. Iron was the norm up until that time – steel had been expensive to produce. Hardware makers were quick to take advantage of this new material. They produced the first of the "butt" and "H" or "Parliament" style lift-off hinges. Quick and easy to produce and strong enough to hold heavy shutters, they found favor in the new construction of the period.

Around 1880 the first examples of "New York" style hardware appeared. Plate steel elements were assembled by unskilled labor in sprawling factories. This hardware style evolved into the many imported forms seen today. It provided the ability to surface mount hinges and tie the wooden elements of the shutters together, and also allowed for smaller and less expensive window and shutter elements. About this time the first commercially produced "S" style tie-backs were seen – manufactured by Stanley Works in Connecticut. Historically an "S" is a very difficult form to forge. Stanley forged the first simple styles for commercial consumption but it wasn't until the 1930s that they started to stamp them.

== Shutter and hardware terminology ==
=== Nuts and bolts terms ===
Battens – the horizontal elements on "board and batten" shutters. Strap hinges usually mount centered on the battens. This is the standard construction approach for most barn doors.

Butt mounted – hinges that mortise into the sides of the hinges – only the barrel of the hinge is visible when the shutter is in the closed position.

Casement – the wood surrounding the window upon which the pintle is typically mounted.

Hinges – mate with the Pintles and are mounted on the shutter.

Pintles – the "pins" on which hinges swing. The pintles are, by definition, mounted to the structure. Pintles are offered in various configurations to match different installation situations.

Rails – with louvered or raised panel shutters, the rails are the horizontal elements of wood that frame the shutter. The width of the rails is an important consideration when choosing surface mounted hardware.

Show hinges – hinges arranged to mount so as to be visible when the shutter is in the open position.

Stiles – when a shutter is louvered or of the raised panel style, the stiles are the vertical elements of the frame. Knowing the width of the stiles allows positioning of the first fastener on strap hinges on their mid-line.

Surface mounted – hinges that mount to the face of the shutter – strap hinges and the "New York Style" hinges are examples. The hinges are visible when the shutter is in the closed position.

=== Installation terminology ===
Offset – the total dimension that the shutter will travel outwards when moved from the closed to the open position. The offset is typically the distance from the face of the casement to the outermost surface of the structure.

The offset is developed in shutter hardware by selection of a pintle made to "stand off" the casement a given distance – the shutter hinge has a sharp bend which moves the hinge barrel away from the face of the shutter at a distance to match the pintle standoff.

When measuring offset, it is critical to allow for irregularities in construction. Because brick and stone openings are rarely plumb and or perfectly flat, it is typical to use the greatest dimension and allow about ½" cushion. If the offset is too small the shutters will not open fully. If the offset is too great, the shutter will function well but sit off of the wall.

Standoff – The pintle standoff is the distance from the face of the casement to the mid-line of the pintle pin. The hinge standoff is the distance from the face of the shutter to the center-line of the hinge barrel. Adding the pintle standoff to the hinge standoff results in the total offset.

Virtually all commercially available shutter hardware is provided with matching standoff on the hinge and pintle. This assumes that the face of the shutter will lie on the same plane as the casement with the shutter in the closed position.

Hinge and pintle standoffs can be custom made to a user's situation. This eases installation and insures proper shutter function.

Throw – This is the measure of the horizontal movement of the edge of the shutter as it swings from the open to the closed position and varies greatly between hinge styles. If too little throw, the open shutter will cover the window molding. Too much throw and too much brick or siding shows between the open shutter edge and the window frame. Proper throw insures that the shutter will comfortably "frame" the window – not obstruct or detract from window detail.

== Regional installation styles ==
=== Shutter mounts on face of structure and closes within masonry opening ===
The shutter is fitted to the dimensions of the masonry opening. The pintle is embedded or surface mounted to the structure itself. The pintle pin is positioned on the outside corner of the masonry. This approach can be seen on brick structures, especially post-civil war commercial multi-story buildings. Also common in the south of Europe, France, Italy, and Austria, it allows the shutter to sit almost fully parallel to the structure.

The European structures are typically stucco coated, with a drive type pintle built diagonally into the masonry prior to stucco finish. A lag screw pintle can be substituted for the drive pintle. Brick structures can employ a similar embedded pintle, or a surface mounted pintle. Storm type strap hinges are typically in Europe. American examples are often tapered.

=== Flush installation with shutter closing within casement ===
The shutter in the closed position fits within the window casement. This was the prevalent approach in the Colonies from New York and south. An advantage is the additional security because the shutters can not be lifted from the pintles in the closed position. A disadvantage is that the shutters must be matched closely to the inside dimension of the casing and the shutter rabbet should match the thickness of the shutters.

Any surface mounted hinge and pintle can be used, assuming there is sufficient width to the casing to accept the pintle. The hinge has a minimal standoff and the pintle would have the same matching standoff. Together an offset of 1–1½ inches will hold the shutter at the same distance from the structure and not quite parallel to the wall.

=== Flush installation shutter sits proud on casing ===
Historically, this approach was seen through the New England colonies. Virtually every old home is a clapboard structure fitted with shutters applied in this manner. They were likely hung on the casing to allow for the frost heaves and movement of the structures in the harsh New England winters. The shutters simply allowed the house to heave and settle behind them.

A strap hinge with a zero offset and an angle pintle matched to the thickness of the shutter will serve in every case. The shutter is removed from the face of the casing by the thickness of the shutter plus the diameter of the pintle pin leaving the shutter to clear the corner of the casing.

=== Offset installation shutter closes within casing ===
This style is traditional to suburbs of Philadelphia, Pennsylvania, including Chester, Bucks, and Montgomery Counties. The amount of the required offset is divided evenly between the hinge and the pintle.
