= Jack L. Chalker bibliography =

Bibliography of science fiction and fantasy writer Jack L. Chalker:

== Series ==
=== The Saga of the Well World series ===
- Midnight at the Well of Souls, Del Rey, 1977 (ISBN 0-7434-3522-2)
- Exiles at the Well of Souls, Del Rey, 1978 (ISBN 0-7434-3603-2)
- Quest for the Well of Souls, Del Rey, 1978 (ISBN 0-7434-7153-9)
- The Return of Nathan Brazil, Del Rey, 1980 (ISBN 0-345-28367-8)
- Twilight at the Well of Souls, Del Rey, 1980 (ISBN 0-345-28368-6)
- The Sea Is Full of Stars, December 1999 (ISBN 0-345-39486-0)
- Ghost of the Well of Souls, 2000 (ISBN 0-345-39485-2)

=== The Watchers at the Well series ===
- Echoes of the Well of Souls, Del Rey, trade paperback, May 1993 (ISBN 0-345-38686-8)
- Shadow of the Well of Souls, Del Rey, February 1994 (ISBN 0-345-36202-0)
- Gods of the Well of Souls, Del Rey, 1994 (ISBN 0-345-38850-X)
- The Watchers at the Well, Science Fiction Book Club (omnibus edition), 1994

=== The Four Lords of the Diamond series ===
- Lilith: A Snake in the Grass, Del Rey, 1981 (ISBN 0-345-29369-X)
- Cerberus: A Wolf in the Fold, Del Rey, 1982 (ISBN 0-345-31122-1)
- Charon: A Dragon at the Gate, Del Rey, 1982 (ISBN 0-345-29370-3)
- Medusa: A Tiger by the Tail, Del Rey, 1983 (ISBN 0-345-29372-X)
- The Four Lords of the Diamond, The Science Fiction Book Club (omnibus edition), 1983

=== The Dancing Gods series ===
- The River of Dancing Gods, Del Rey, 1984 (ISBN 0-345-30892-1)
- Demons of the Dancing Gods, Del Rey, 1984 (ISBN 0-345-30893-X)
- Vengeance of the Dancing Gods, Del Rey, July 1985 (ISBN 0-345-31549-9)
- Songs of the Dancing Gods, Del Rey, August 1990 (ISBN 0-345-34799-4)
- Horrors of the Dancing Gods, 1994 (ISBN 0-345-37692-7)
- The Dancing Gods: Part One, Del Rey, November 1995 (ISBN 0-345-40246-4). This is an omnibus volume containing The River of Dancing Gods and Demons of the Dancing Gods
- The Dancing Gods II, Del Rey, September 1996 (ISBN 0-345-40771-7). This is an omnibus volume containing Vengeance of the Dancing Gods and Songs of the Dancing Gods

=== The Soul Rider series ===
- Spirits of Flux and Anchor, Tor Books, 1984 (ISBN 0-8125-3320-8) 2nd in Chronology
- Empires of Flux and Anchor, Tor Books, 1984 (ISBN 0-8125-3329-1) 3rd in Chronology
- Masters of Flux and Anchor, Tor Books, January 1985 (ISBN 0-8125-3281-3) 4th in Chronology
- The Birth of Flux and Anchor, Tor Books, 1985 (ISBN 0-8125-2292-3) 1st in Chronology
- Children of Flux and Anchor, Tor Books, September 1986 (ISBN 0-8125-2340-7) 5th in Chronology

=== The Rings of the Master series ===
- Lords of the Middle Dark, Del Rey Books, May 1986 (ISBN 0-345-32560-5)
- Pirates of the Thunder, Del Rey Books, March 1987 (ISBN 0-345-32561-3)
- Warriors of the Storm, Del Rey Books, August 1987 (ISBN 0-345-32562-1)
- Masks of the Martyrs, Del Rey, February 1988 (ISBN 0-345-34309-3)

=== The G.O.D. Inc. series ===
- The Labyrinth of Dreams, Tor Books, March 1987 (ISBN 0-8125-3306-2)
- The Shadow Dancers, Tor Books, July 1987 (ISBN 0-812-53308-9)
- The Maze in the Mirror, Tor Books, January 1989 (ISBN 0-8125-2069-6)

=== The Changewinds series ===
- When the Changewinds Blow, Ace-Putnam's, September 1987
- Riders of the Winds, Ace Books, May 1988
- War of the Maelstrom, Ace-Putnam's, October 1988 (ISBN 0-441-10268-9)
- Changewinds, Baen (omnibus edition), August 1996

=== The Quintara Marathon series ===
- The Demons at Rainbow Bridge, Ace-Putnam's, hardcover, September 1989 (ISBN 0-441-69992-8)
- The Run to Chaos Keep, Ace-Putnam's, May 1991 (ISBN 0-441-69348-2)
- The Ninety Trillion Fausts (a.k.a. 90 Trillion Fausts), Ace-Putnam's, October 1991 (ISBN 0-441-58103-X)

=== The Wonderland Gambit series ===
- The Cybernetic Walrus, Del Rey, trade pb in November 1995
- The March Hare Network, 1996
- The Hot-Wired Dodo, Del Rey, Feb. 1997

=== The Three Kings series ===
- Balshazzar's Serpent, Baen Books 1999
- Melchior's Fire, Baen Books, 2001
- Kaspar's Box, 2003

== Stand-alone novels ==
- A Jungle of Stars, Ballantine, Del Rey, 1976 (ISBN 0-345-28960-9)
- The Web of the Chozen, Del Rey, 1978 (ISBN 0-345-27376-1)
- And the Devil Will Drag You Under, Del Rey, 1979 (ISBN 0-345-30504-3)
- A War of Shadows, Ace: An Analog Book, 1979
- Dancers in the Afterglow, Del Rey, 1979, 1982 (ISBN 0-345-30493-4)
- The Devil's Voyage, Doubleday, 1981
- The Identity Matrix, Timescape: Pocket Books, 1982 (ISBN 0-671-65547-7)
- Downtiming the Night Side, Tor Books, May 1985 (ISBN 0-8125-3288-0)
- The Messiah Choice, St. Martins - Blue Jay, May 1985
- The Red Tape War (with Mike Resnick and George Alec Effinger). Tor hardcover, April 1991
- Priam's Lens, Del Rey, 1997 (ISBN 0-345-40294-4)
- The Moreau Factor, Del Rey, Feb. 2000
- Chameleon (partially completed at time of death)

== Collections and anthologies ==
- Dance Band on the Titanic, Del Rey Books, July 1988 (short stories)
- Hotel Andromeda (editor), Ace, 1994 (ISBN 0-441-00010-X)

Besides the short stories included in Dance Band on the Titanic, Chalker wrote at least one other short story:

- "And Now Falls the Cold, Cold Night". Alternate Presidents, ed. Mike Resnick, Tor 1992.

== Miscellaneous ==
- An Informal Biography of Scrooge McDuck. Baltimore: Mirage Press, 1974. ISBN 0883585022. OCLC 3237986
