= Dance Band on the Titanic =

Dance Band on the Titanic may refer to:

- Dance Band on the Titanic (album), a 1977 album by Harry Chapin
- Dance Band on the Titanic (song), a 1977 single by Harry Chapin, from the above album
- Dance Band on the Titanic (collection), a 1988 collection of short stories by Jack L. Chalker
