= Saekki seo bal =

Korean folk tale

Saekki seo bal (새끼 서 발 Three Straw Ropes) is a Korean folk tale about a boy who is thrown out of his home for being lazy but possesses three pieces of straw rope that gradually grow and become valuable, making him rich. It is sometimes classified as a formula tale by those focusing on its structure of repeating and accumulating success on the part of the protagonist.

== History and Transmission ==
The first recorded version of Saekki seo bal was Geeureumbaengi sanae-ui bok (게으름뱅이 사내의 복 The Luck of the Lazy Boy), a traditional fairy tale serialized by Song Geum-seon in the 1930s in Japanese in the Keijō Nippō. A later version, with no clear date or location marked, was collected by Im Seok-jae in 1943 in Hongseong, Chungcheongnam-do Province and published in Volume 6 of Hanguk gujeon seolhwa (한국구전설화 Korean Oral Tales) in the 1990s. More than 20 different versions are found in anthologies including Hanguk gubi munhak daegye (한국구비문학대계 Outlines of Korean Oral Literature).

== Plot ==
=== Basic plot ===
Long ago, there lived a woman and her lazy son. The mother gave the son three pieces of rice straw rope and kicked him out. A pot seller he met on the road offered to swap a pot for some straw rope, which he needed. So the son gave away the rope and received a pot. After setting off again, he met a young woman who had broken her pot, so he swapped his pot for a mal (말; a unit of measurement) of rice from her. At a house where he stopped for the night, a mouse ate all his rice, so he took the mouse with him instead. At another house a cat ate his mouse, so he took the cat instead. At another house, a horse trod on his cat and killed it, so the horse's owners gave him the horse. He came across someone burying a dead young woman, so he swapped the horse for her corpse. At one place, a pretty young woman pushed the corpse over. The boy scolded her, saying she had killed a healthy woman, and was given the pretty young woman instead. On the road again, they met a rich man. Lusting after the young woman, the rich man proposed a bet with the boy. They decided to bet on solving a riddle. The boy asked, “Who swapped some rice straw rope for a pot, a pot for some rice, some rice for a mouse, a mouse for a cat, a cat for a horse, a horse for a dead woman, and a dead woman for a live woman?” The rich man was unable to answer, so the boy took all his money, and the young woman, returned home and went on to live a good life.

=== Variations ===
Some versions make the protagonist an aristocrat on his way to take the civil service examination, like Jopssal han al-lo jeongseung-ui sawi (좁쌀 한 알로 정승의 사위 Marrying the Minister's Daughter with One Grain of Millet), or a farmhand, rather than a lazy boy. Some forms, such as Dwiju jigo gandaji (뒤주 지고 간다지 Carrying Off the Rice Chest) are almost identical to Saekki seo bal in their first half, but then show the protagonist losing what he has received at the end of the story, when the young woman changes into bean curd. In other cases, the source of the boy's success is not three pieces of rice straw rope but a grain that he grows himself, such as millet, as in Jo isak-euro seonggonghan sanae (조 이삭으로 성공한 사내 The Man Who Achieved Success with an Ear of Millet), or sesame; in still other cases the boy succeeds not by swapping items but through successfully growing his own crop of grain.

== Features and Significance ==
This story proceeds with the protagonist swapping a series of items for increasingly bigger, more valuable things: three pieces of rice straw rope - pot - rice - mouse - cat - horse - dead woman - live woman - the possessions of a rich man. In versions that feature grains such as millet or rice instead of straw rope, the order of trading is as follows: one ear of millet - mouse - cat - horse - bull - government minister's daughter. When the focus is put on this structure of repetition, this tale is sometime classified as a “formula tale.” Formula tales emphasize a certain form, or “framework,” showing accumulation or repetition through a series of connections.

In Saekki seo bal, a lazy boy achieves great success through surprising resourcefulness. The way the son leaves home and achieves success by swapping items can be seen as a coming-of-age tale showing a weak, helpless son becoming independent from his mother. The protagonist gains wealth through all his exchanges but deceives innocent people in the process; this, in reality, is unacceptable behavior. But as a fictional tale it has meaning in the way it shows a weak character using extraordinary resourcefulness to beat a powerful one and become successful. This feature shows itself most clearly in the final scene, in which the boy tricks the greedy rich man. In sum, this tale can be seen as the simple and primitive thoughts of common people contained in a form of accumulation and repetition.

== Other ==
A similar tale to this one is found in India's Jātaka, thought to date from the third or fourth century CE, indicating that this is a very old story. It is found all over the world, too. “The Profitable Exchange,” No. 1655 in Stith Thompson's book The Types of Folktale, has the same form, as does Japan's Warashibe chōja (わらしべ長者 Straw Millionaire). One Philippine tale features a monkey as its protagonist and takes the form of an animal tale with an unusual structure involving some narrative elements in which the monkey gradually sees more profit from its trades, and others in which it makes gradual losses.
