= Charon: A Dragon at the Gate =

1982 novel by Jack l. Chalker

- First edition
- Author: Jack L. Chalker
- Cover artist: David B. Mattingly
- Language: English
- Series: Four Lords of the Diamond series
- Genre: Science fiction
- Publisher: Del Rey
- Publication date: 1982
- Publication place: United States
- Media type: Print (Paperback)
- ISBN: 0-345-35247-5
- OCLC: 277005501
- Preceded by: Cerberus: A Wolf in the Fold
- Followed by: Medusa: A Tiger by the Tail

Charon: A Dragon at the Gate is a science fiction novel by American writer Jack L. Chalker, the third book in the Four Lords of the Diamond. First published as a paperback in 1982, it continues the saga started in Lilith: A Snake in the Grass and Cerberus: A Wolf in the Fold and is concluded by the fourth and last book called, Medusa: A Tiger by the Tail.

== Setting ==
The Confederacy is a collection of human populated worlds in which all members are biologically and socially engineered to be perfect and docile citizens in a materialistic utopia. Any alien worlds that the Confederation comes across are assimilated or eliminated. Not wishing to stagnate, the Confederacy continually expands, and the worlds of the Frontier have humans of unaltered genetics.

Despite the Confederacy's best efforts, there are always criminals. Over-ambitious politicians, too powerful religious leaders, and the usual white collar criminals and violent offenders. To track down such people the Confederacy has bred Assassins, who are assigned to deal with such. Often that involves killing the offenders or giving them a brain wipe and new personality. However, the best of the criminal elite are exiled to the Warden Diamond - those with connections, or those who may have information that insures that powerful people will protect them.

The Warden Diamond is the Confederacy's penal colony. It is four human habitable worlds circling a single star, and that has a unique organism, the Warden Organism that is a microscopic symbiotic lifeform. When one is exposed to it, it takes up residence in each cell of one's body, generally improving it and seeing to the body's continued health. It can also give a person additional powers, that vary depending on which variety they have been exposed to and how well their mind can be in tune with the vague collective consciousness of the organism. Due to the fact that people die if they are taken out of the Warden System, it is thought to be the perfect penal colony, as escape is impossible.

The Confederacy has learned in the first book that an alien race of unknown power, size or location has discovered them. And has managed to have human looking robots infiltrate the Confederacy to access data on the military capabilities of mankind. The aliens are apparently getting inside information from the criminal bosses who run the Warden Diamond. An Assassin, whose name is never given in the entire series, but who calls himself "Mr. Carroll" in the last book, was called in as he is the best they have.

It was explained to him that his department will be taking a mindprint of him and placing it in the bodies of four condemned criminals. That way, one of "him" can be sent to each of the Warden worlds, with the plan of assassinating each of the Four Lords of the Diamond. This will destabilize things and buy the Confederacy time to prepare against the alien menace. "Mr. Carroll" will be in a picket ship outside the contamination zone of the Warden Diamond, and have each of the agent's experiences uploaded into his mind, by means of an organic transmitter that each carries in his brain.

In this way, he can collate all the data from each world, as from his perspective he will have "lived" on each through his surrogates. He is aided in this by a self-aware computer, who is his partner, and in some ways, his overseer.

Having received the first and second report from Lilith and Cerberus, this third book deals with his receipt of the report from Charon.

== Plot summary ==
"He" wakes up on a prison ship, and discovers that "he" is a copy. He learns that he is in the body of a notorious killer of women named "Park Lacoch", and that he is very short. At the orientation on Charon, a hot and steamy world of jungles and deserts, he learns that magic works. Magic here means that some individuals can sense, and learn to control, the Warden organism that pervades everything and everyone. It is possible to fool the Wardens into believing they are something else, such as converting a fruit juice to poison, or changing a person into an animal. One's status depends a lot on how much of the power one can learn to use.

Park is singled out early, during the placement interviews the newcomers are getting. He is told that the leadership of the planet is aware that there is a Confederacy Assassin planted on Charon to kill the Lord of Charon, Aeolia Matuze. The agent "Park" is well aware of this, as he is that very agent, just arrived. Fortunately for him, the security interviewer is under the impression that Park's new girlfriend, Zala, is the Assassin, as she has a genetically created double mind.

Park is assigned as a Town Accountant to a town where the authorities believe he will be contacted by a well-organized group of revolutionaries seeking to re-install a former Lord of Charon that Aeolia displaced. After a series of adventures, Park gains much control over the power, and with Zala (aka Kira) and his new girlfriend Darva, assists in an attack on the palace where Aeolia Matuze resides. This attack is a coordinated one, coinciding with the overthrow of the government everywhere, and prompted by Dr. Dumonia of Cerberus, a Confederate plant with many agendas.

The attack is successful, but the former Lord of Charon cannot go through with killing Aeolia, who was his ex-wife that he still had feelings for. Aeolia, not as sentimental, kills him. When it seems that all is lost, Kira kills Aeolia, with the tacit approval of Aeolia's Chief of Security, Yatek Morah, who as it turns out, is really in the employ of the aliens. Yatek having no love for the late Aeolia, is willing to discuss matters with Park, and there is the implication that Park will have a chance to become the new Lord of Charon.

The book closes with the Agent in the picket ship being even more affected by this latest experience. He more than ever questions the values and efficacy of the Confederacy, and wishes to delay making a final report because he fears what his government's response will be. The computer shows that it is more than merely an assistant or partner, by nearly overriding him, and almost not letting him out of the capsule. "Mr. Carroll" manages to convince the computer that he will return, and only wishes to gather the final report from Medusa before making his report to the Confederacy.

The saga continues in the fourth and last book of the series, Medusa: A Tiger by the Tail.

== Style ==
Chalker's style in the writing of this four-book series is that of formula fiction of itself, in that it extensively copies its narrative from book to book, even word for word. Each book opens with a short story about some way the aliens are disrupting the Confederacy, then shifts to the background story of the Confederacy learning of the aliens and of the Agent being recruited, briefed and awakening on the prison ship. The story of that is identical in each book. From there, it is, in the first three books, purely an adventure story involving the copied agent trying to assassinate the local Lord, getting a girlfriend, and learning about himself in the process. Each of the first three books then close with a discussion between the Agent in the picket ship and his computer partner/overseer. Only the concluding book, Medusa: A Tiger by the Tail, departs a bit from this.
