= Well World =

Series of science fiction novels by Jack L. Chalker

Well World series
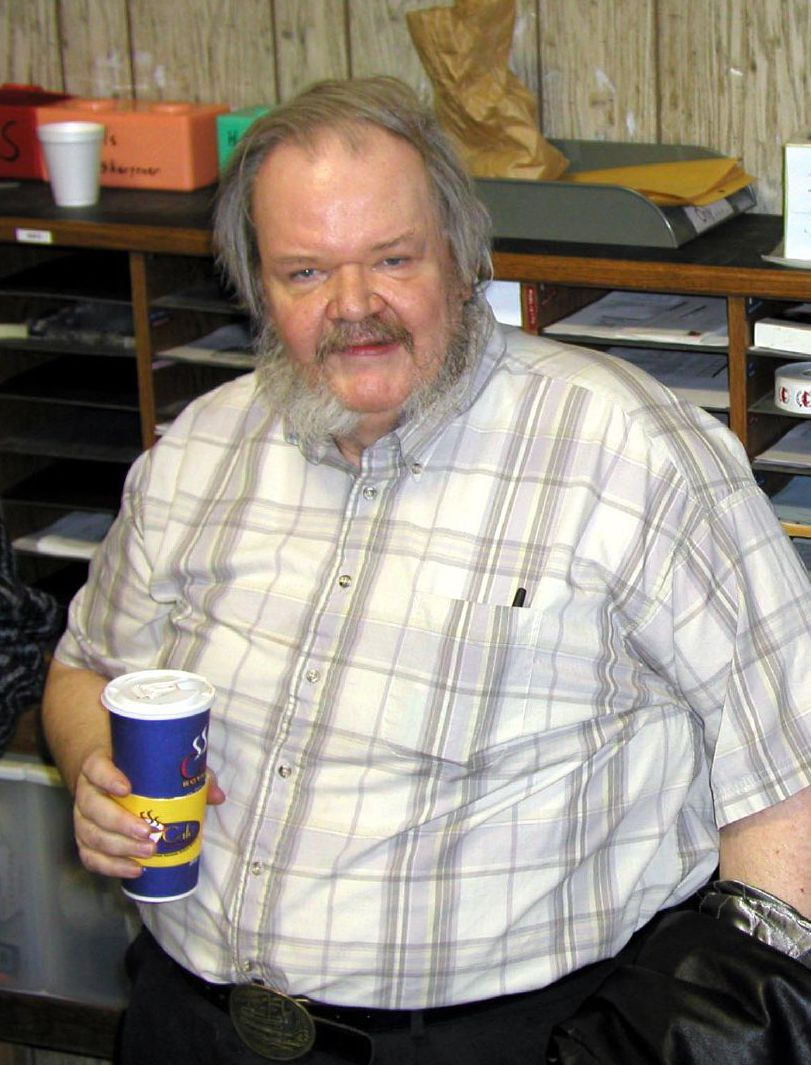
- Jack Chalker in 2003
- Midnight at the Well of Souls (1977); Exiles at the Well of Souls (1978); Quest for the Well of Souls (1978); The Return of Nathan Brazil (1980); Twilight at the Well of Souls (1980); Echoes of the Well of Souls (1993); Shadow of the Well of Souls (1994); Gods of the Well of Souls (1994); The Sea is Full of Stars (1999); Ghost of the Well of Souls (2000)
- Author: Jack L. Chalker
- Country: United States
- Language: English
- Genre: Science Fiction
- Publisher: Del Rey Books
- Published: 1977 – 2000
- Media type: Print
- No. of books: 10

Well World is a series of science fiction novels by Jack L. Chalker. It involves a planet-sized supercomputer known as the Well of Souls that builds reality on top of an underlying one of greater complexity but smaller size. The computer was built by a now-extinct race, the Markovians, who developed the Well of Souls with the goal of creating a new species that would transcend their own.

The Well World is the planet that houses the Well of Souls, and it exists within the original Markovian reality. Its surface was used as an experimental site where the Markovians tested their species designs before sending the successful ones into the new universe to populate planets. Humans are one of many such designed species who now live in the "real" world. During the time period of the novels, the Well World has been abandoned and left on its own for an unknown length of time.

The books mainly follow a mysterious character known as Nathan Brazil, who has an (initially) unknown connection to the Well World. The books are adventures that follow Brazil and a changing cast of secondary characters through a series of visits to the Well World over a period of hundreds (and millions) of years.

== Setting ==
The series is largely set on a fictional planet named Well World. The Well World was constructed by an ancient alien species, known as the Markovians, who felt they had reached a dead end in their evolution. The Well World houses a planet-sized, reality-shaping computer that creates an artificial universe layered on top of the much smaller, original Markovian one. The Well World exists within the original Markovian universe, and can only be accessed through gateways on a number of Markovian planets scattered through the artificial universe. The Markovians experimented in species design on the Well World, sending the more successful ones into the new universe to populate one of these planets. By the time of the stories in the series, the Markovians have vanished, leaving behind the Well World, continually maintaining the new universe.

The Well World's surface is composed primarily of 1560 large hexagonal regions—called "hexes"—each with an independent and often dramatically different climate and ecosystem, that David Langford compares to the hexagonally tiled boards used in "hex-and-counter" forms of tabletop wargaming. Each of these hexes is a prototype environment for a planet that exists in the external universe, half of which, comprising the planet's southern hemisphere, contain carbon-based (or similar) oxygen-breathing life. The North is made up of exotic species which are often so alien that no common ground exists between them and the Southern races, and, often, their Northern neighbors as well. Since the Northern hemisphere contains, for example, seas of oxygen, chlorine, methane, and ammonia, Southern races need some kind of life support in the North. The two hemispheres are separated by an impermeable wall that extends "several kilometers upward". In the hexes that are bisected by the wall there is a separate gateway (the "avenue") to the Well of Souls, the control center for the computer.

The Well World computer also maintains a "tech level" for each of the hexes, making equipment of a higher level simply fail to work. High-tech hexes work as in the "real" universe, allowing any device to work. Semi-tech hexes allow simple machines to work, up to about the level of the steam engine, and any device using electricity will not work. Low-tech hexes allow no machines to work, and all effort has to be created by muscles. Even then, there are exceptions; Gedamondas is low-tech, but the Gedamondans can use naturally occurring steam from their volcanic vents, and the Agitar can electrocute people in any hex, regardless of tech level. Also, while chemical firearms do not, as a general rule, work in nontech hexes, matches and certain kinds of chemical explosives will, although the explosives can be dangerously unstable in nontech hexes. In some of the hexes, however, the Well World computer allows the inhabitants access to limited manipulation of reality, or "magic" (this is most commonly in low- and semi-tech hexes, but high-tech magic hexes have been mentioned). Vehicles that travel from hex to hex need to be equipped with multiple forms of power.

In addition to the hexes, the two polar regions, or "zones" contain maintenance areas, including a series of ambassadorial offices. These can be reached via gateways near the centers of each of the hexes, allowing easy transit from hex to pole for meetings and other duties. Newcomers to the Well World find themselves in the zones, where they are greeted by one of the ambassadors and then sent through a gateway. During this initial transit, the Well World computer transforms the traveler into a member of one of the many races, and sends them on to the associated hexes. From that point, the traveler is treated as a native of that hex. Since the only way to enter/leave Zone is through a Zone Gate, and exiting through any Zone Gate always takes one to their home hex, it is generally impossible for Southern and Northern races to travel into the other hemisphere. An InterZone Gate allows Northern and Southern ambassadors to travel between opposite Zones, and most materials can be transported via Zone gates, so there is some limited trade between North and South; for example, "universal translators" are grown in a Northern hex, and allow almost all races to communicate, at least within the limits of common ground. A very few instances of travel from North to South (or vice versa) have occurred, but these were exceptional.

The Equatorial Barrier contains six "Avenues" on either side of the barrier; each avenue leads up to the naked barrier. These are the only authorized entry points to the Well of Souls computer which controls and regulates the entire universe. The main control room contains what appears to be a crystal model of the Well World, but is, in fact, a separate control computer which regulates and stabilizes the Well World itself. This allows the main computer to be shut down and restarted without destroying the Well World. Any person who carries the "Original" pattern is converted into "Markovian" (also "Ancient", "Creator", or "Maker") form to solve design problems, as only this form possesses the capacity, knowledge, and capabilities necessary to interface with the main Brain. Also, any such personnel are recognized during Well processing, and treated as individuals of the race from which they originated. For this reason, Nathan Brazil (and, later, Mavra Chang) is translated to Glathrial, the home of type 41 (humans), without even being normalized to the Well-specific form.

In addition to the Well World, some of the action in the stories, typically the introductions, takes place in the multi-stellar human empire. In the early books this largely controlled by the Community of Worlds (the "Com"), where genetically engineered clones are widely used to form peaceful communist societies. In later books the Community has been replaced by the Realm, a confederation of over forty races. In the Watchers at the Well trilogy, the action starts on contemporary Earth long after the reset of the Well Computer.

== Analysis ==
Writer Max P. Belin observes that as a plot device, the Well World has its advantages and disadvantages. It enables the protagonists of the stories to travel "across mountains, grasslands, oceans, deserts, and forests" without the use of any magical means for moving from world to world (such as those in C. S. Lewis's The Magician's Nephew (1955), which would be outside the domain of a science fiction story) or inexplicable "hypertechnology". Rather, they travel under their own power from hex to hex. (With many hexes, it is possible to travel from one border to another in a matter of days, or sometimes weeks.) Since each hex not only has different environments and species—ranging from conventional classical mythological species such as yeti, centaurs, and satyrs to more esoteric science fiction species such as giant carnivorous insects and mobile plants—but as well a different, fixed, level of allowable technology—from non-tech and semi-tech hexes through to highly advanced technology that closely resembles outright magic (plus actual Well magic)—and since there are 1,560 of them, the author never need repeat situations and locations through the entire series of books.

The Well World also introduces extra plot elements. Since every person apart from Nathan Brazil, a major protagonist of several of the stories, is transformed into one of the Well World's own 1,560 species by the act of passing through the gateway on a Markovian world to the Well World, they have to cope with travelling companions who used to be human but no longer are, and all of the ensuing problems.

The Well World forces the introduction of two additional plot elements into every story. Since the only routes to the Well World from the outside are the gateways on the now-deserted and forgotten Markovian planets, every story has to incorporate their rediscovery in some fashion. Similarly, since there is no normal way off the Well World's surface from the hexes to either the original Markovian or the new artificial universe, every story has to incorporate an "escape from an escape-proof laboratory" of some kind for the characters to interact with the external universe. Furthermore, the nature of the Well World as a set of laboratory environments, whose technology levels and ecosystems are forcibly computer-controlled, limits what can potentially occur therein.

== Well World book series ==
=== The Well of Souls series ===
1. Midnight at the Well of Souls (1977), Del Rey (ISBN 0-7434-3522-2)
2. Exiles at the Well of Souls (1978), Del Rey (ISBN 0-7434-3603-2)
3. Quest for the Well of Souls (1978), Del Rey (ISBN 0-7434-7153-9)
4. The Return of Nathan Brazil (1980), Del Rey (ISBN 0-345-28367-8)
5. Twilight at the Well of Souls (1980), Del Rey (ISBN 0-345-28368-6)
6. The Sea is Full of Stars (December 1999), Del Rey (ISBN 0-345-39486-0)
7. Ghost of the Well of Souls (2000), Del Rey (ISBN 0-345-39485-2)

=== The Watchers at the Well series ===
1. Echoes of the Well of Souls (May 1993), Del Rey, trade paperback (ISBN 0-345-38686-8)
2. Shadow of the Well of Souls (February 1994), Del Rey (ISBN 0-345-36202-0)
3. Gods of the Well of Souls (1994), Del Rey (ISBN 0-345-38850-X)

== Cited sources ==
- Belin, Max P. (1989). "Infinity in your Back Pocket: Pocket Universes and Adjacent Worlds". In Slusser, George Edgar; Rabkin, Eric S. (eds.). Mindscapes: the geographies of imagined worlds. SIU Press. ISBN 9780809314546.
- Jacob, Merle; Apple, Hope (2000). "Chalker, Jack § 240. Well World". To be continued: an annotated guide to sequels (2nd ed.). Greenwood Publishing Group. ISBN 9781573561556.
- Langford, David (2005). "Games". In Westfahl, Gary (ed.). The Greenwood encyclopedia of science fiction and fantasy: themes, works, and wonders. Vol. 1. Greenwood Publishing Group. ISBN 9780313329517.
- Smith, Curtis C., ed. (1986). "Jack L. Chalker". Twentieth-Century Science-Fiction Writers (2nd ed.). St. James Press. ISBN 9780912289274.
