= Quest for the Well of Souls =

1978 novel by Jack L. Chalker

- First Edition
- Author: Jack L. Chalker
- Cover artist: Darrell K. Sweet
- Language: English
- Genre: Science fiction
- Publisher: Del Rey
- Publication date: 1978
- Publication place: United States
- Media type: Print (paperback)
- ISBN: 0-7434-7153-9
- OCLC: 52739202
- Preceded by: Exiles at the Well of Souls
- Followed by: The Return of Nathan Brazil

Quest for the Well of Souls is the third book in the Well of Souls series by the American author Jack L. Chalker, and completes the Wars of the Well World duology begun with Exiles at the Well of Souls. A foreword by Chalker indicates that Quest and Exiles were originally conceived as a single book, but due to the decision to split them, Quest was written to be readable as a standalone novel.

== Plot summary ==
In Exiles at the Well of Souls, Mavra Chang was captured by the Olborn, who use magical stones to convert beings into beasts of burden. The Olborn were interrupted partway through transforming Chang, leaving her partially transformed. Eleven years later, Chang remains an involuntary guest in the native hex of the human equivalents on the Well, Glathriel. After multiple attempts to escape, she has been reconditioned to accept her existence, and a maimed Glathrielite, Joshi, has undergone a similar partial transformation in Olborn to serve as a companion for Mavra.

Inspired by the Diviner and the Rel, the Northern being that crossed from the Northern to the Southern Hemisphere in Midnight at the Well of Souls, several competing factions have discovered that the Northern beings inhabiting the hex of Yugash can "possess" a Southerner and allow him to pass into Yugash. In Exiles at the Well of Souls, two ships were crash-landed on the Well World. The first landed in the South, and was destroyed at the end of the war in Exiles. The second landed in the north, and now the factions that fought the war in Exiles are girding for a race to the second ship.

Several other players who participated in the drama in Exiles are also introduced. Antor Trelig was a politician as well as the head of the sponge syndicate, in control of a significant fraction of the council governing human space. He was transformed at the Well World into a Makiem, a giant frog-like creature. Renard was the librarian on Trelig's resort planetoid of New Pompeii, which was subsequently transformed into the home of Obie, the supercomputer capable of using Markovian physics to manipulate the universe. Renard was transformed into an Agitar, a blue-colored satyr who rides winged horses. Ben Yulin was the assistant to Dr. Gilgram Zinder, Obie's designer, as well as an agent for Trellig. Yulin was transformed into a Dasheen, a minotaur.

After a showdown between Mavra's party and Yulin's party, the remnants agree to a truce with Yulin and return in the ship to Obie. In addition to Mavra and Yulin, the other members of the party are Renard, a Yugash, a Bozog (another northern species, they moved the ship from the non-tech hex it landed in to their own high-tech hex), a Lata (a southern species resembling a pixie) named Vistaru (previously Vardia Diplo), and a Yaxa (a southern species resembling a giant butterfly) named Wooley (previously Wu Julee and Kally Tonge). Once they arrive, Ben Yulin attempts to take over Obie, but the computer assists Mavra and the others in destroying the circuit that forces Obie to obey Yulin. Obie returns to human space, and when a Council fleet arrives to destroy him, he fakes his own destruction and departs with Mavra to explore the rest of the universe as partners.

== Characters ==
- Antor Trelig, a corrupt human politician, now a frog-like Makiem
- Serge Ortega, a former freighter captain reborn as an Ulik, a six-armed being that is half-man, half-snake
- Torshind, a Yugash fanatic on the side of Ben Yulin and the Yaxa
- Mavra Chang, at one time a freighter pilot, transformed into a half-donkey, half-human beast in Olborn
- Joshi, a native Glathrielite (Well human), underwent the same transformation as Mavra after being maimed in a fire
- Ben Yulin, formerly Gil Zinder's assistant and Antor Trelig's agent, now a minotaur-like Dasheen and a capable pilot
- Wooley, a butterfly-like Yaxa who was formerly an Entry (Kally Tonge, née Wu Julee) on the side of Mavra Chang
- Renard, at one time the librarian on New Pompeii, now a satyr-like Agitar
- Ghiskind, a Yugash on the side of Mavra Chang and Antor Trelig
- Vistaru, a pixie-like Lata who was formerly an Entry (Star Tonge, née Vardia Diplo 1261)
- Obie, the sentient computer built by Yulin and Zinder to manipulate the basic fabric of the universe
