= Medusa: A Tiger by the Tail =

1983 novel by Jack L. Chalker

- First edition
- Author: Jack L. Chalker
- Cover artist: David B. Mattingly
- Language: English
- Series: Four Lords of the Diamond series
- Genre: Science fiction
- Publisher: Del Rey
- Publication date: 1983
- Publication place: United States
- Media type: Print (paperback)
- ISBN: 0-345-29372-X
- Preceded by: Charon: A Dragon at the Gate

Medusa: A Tiger by the Tail is a science fiction novel by American writer Jack L. Chalker, the fourth book in the Four Lords of the Diamond series. First published as a paperback in 1983. It concludes the saga started in Lilith: A Snake in the Grass, Cerberus: A Wolf in the Fold and Charon: A Dragon at the Gate.

== Setting ==
The Confederacy is a collection of human populated worlds in which all members are biologically and socially engineered to be perfect and docile citizens in a materialistic utopia. Any alien worlds that the Confederation comes across are assimilated or eliminated. Not wishing to stagnate, the Confederacy continually expands, and the worlds of the Frontier have humans of unaltered genetics.

Despite the Confederacy's best efforts, there are always criminals. Over-ambitious politicians, too powerful religious leaders, and the usual white collar criminals and violent offenders. To track down such people the Confederacy has bred Assassins, who are assigned to deal with such. Often that involves killing the offenders or giving them a brain wipe and new personality. However, the best of the criminal elite are exiled to the Warden Diamond - those with connections, or those who may have information that insures that powerful people will protect them.

The Warden Diamond is the Confederacy's penal colony. It is four human habitable worlds circling a single star, and that has a unique organism, the Warden Organism that is a microscopic symbiotic lifeform. When one is exposed to it, it takes up residence in each cell of one's body, generally improving it and seeing to the body's continued health. It can also give a person additional powers, that vary depending on which variety they have been exposed to and how well their mind can be in tune with the vague collective consciousness of the organism. Due to the fact that people die if they are taken out of the Warden System, it is thought to be the perfect penal colony, as escape is impossible.

The Confederacy has learned in the first book that an alien race of unknown power, size or location has discovered them. And has managed to have human looking robots infiltrate the Confederacy to access data on the military capabilities of mankind. The aliens are apparently getting inside information from the criminal bosses who run the Warden Diamond. An Assassin, whose name is never given in the entire series, but who calls himself "Mr. Carroll" in the last book, was called in as he is the best they have.

It was explained to him that his department will be taking a mindprint of him and placing it in the bodies of four condemned criminals. That way, one of "him" can be sent to each of the Warden worlds, with the plan of assassinating each of the Four Lords of the Diamond. This will destabilize things and buy the Confederacy time to prepare against the alien menace. "Mr. Carroll" will be in a picket ship outside the contamination zone of the Warden Diamond, and have each of the agent's experiences uploaded into his mind, by means of an organic transmitter that each carries in his brain.

In this way, he can collate all the data from each world, as from his perspective he will have "lived" on each through his surrogates. He is aided in this by a self-aware computer, who is his partner, and in some ways, his overseer.

Having received the first, second and third report from Lilith, Cerberus and Charon, this last book deals with his receipt of the report from Medusa and the conclusion to the saga.

== Plot summary ==
He wakes up on the prison ship and realizes that "he" is a copy. He is in the body of a 13-year-old boy named Tarin Bul, a boy who had killed the man who killed his father. The boy had his mind wiped and the Agent's mind placed in it. The ship is taking him to Medusa, the farthest out of the Diamond worlds, and the coldest. At the newcomer orientation, he learns that technology works just fine on Medusa, and due to the Warden powers, all people infected can adapt to the extreme cold automatically. It is not revealed to him that the adaptive ability is quite comprehensive, and with proper sensitization to the Wardens, one could become almost any life form.

It is a totalitarian society, one headed by Talant Ypsir, who has helped perfect a system of complete surveillance of nearly all parts of the cities of the planets, overseen by The Monitor Service, who are both the police and secret police. Given his age, he is hampered in his drive for social mobility, as it will be some years before he is old enough for any real job. He is paired with a girl and assigned a communal apartment unit.

He achieves some degree of progress when The Monitor Service calls him in and it is proposed that he be an informer. TMS plans to give him a promotion that will put him in the position of being recruited by an underground group of revolutionaries who wish to overthrow the system, and who may be in league with other such groups on other Diamond worlds. "Tarin" agrees to do this, though his sympathies already lie with the revolutionaries, and he still intends to complete his mission of assassinating the Lord of Medusa.

He is recruited, and quickly demonstrates to the cabal that he is a far better recruit than they had thought, given his genetically enhanced background and social training as an administrator and assassin. He then embarks on playing both sides, with the unwitting aid of the Major in TMS who recruited him who gives his girlfriend a mindprinter program that allows her to support Tarin no matter which side he is on.

The revolutionists are eventually caught, and the Major is implied to have been arrested for perhaps not being loyal, and thus Tarin and his girlfriend must escape the city into the wild. They do so, accompanied by three other women, one who dies during the escape. Tarin and three remaining women find themselves alone in the frozen tundra, where they discover that their bodies have adapted quite well. Tarin speculates that if they can find "the Wild Ones", the people who left when the controls became to oppressive, they might have a pool of shape-shifting revolutionaries to draw upon so that he can still complete his mission.

The Wild Ones eventually find them, and take them to a semi-religious meeting place of these nomads where they are introduced to the elders. These people have control of their Wardens and can shape-shift, and advise Tarin to go to a specific point on Medusa where people can directly detect the Warden consciousness. After a long trek with a group of pilgrims, Tarin manages to do so, and senses what feels like an enormous computer that notes him, but is unconcerned with him. It explains to him why there seems to be a form of planet worship on each of the Warden worlds.

On the way back, creatures he believes to be the aliens kill off most of the group, and capture his girlfriend. Tarin sees that the aliens give the captured people to The Monitor Service, who take them to a city in a shuttle. Tarin shifts into a bird to fly after them. Reaching the city, he takes what he believes to be a brief nap, due to the exhausting flight. He awakes and using his shape shifting abilities tries to track his girlfriend down. He is caught, though, as he had actually slept a full day. He is taken up to a space station to await being mindwiped and transformed into a "Goodtime Girl", a sex slave for the amusement of the powerful.

Once there, Tarin learns that Talant Ypsir knows he's a Confederacy Assassin, and plans to change Tarin into a special Goodtime Girl who is unusually sexy and developed, but whose mind will be that of a low-IQ sex slave programmed to submit to all of Talant's desires, and to protect him from any danger. The programmer who is to wipe Tarin's mind is not a loyal support of Talant's, though, and inserts a sub-program such that if Tarin, to be renamed "Ass", sees Talant Ypsir and his two immediate subordinates and successors at the same time, that "she" will go into overdrive and kill them all.

At this point the story must shift to the Agent in the picket ship, who calls himself "Mr. Carroll", a Lewis Carroll reference as one of the planets of the Warden system is named "Momrath" with a moon named "Boojum" from Carroll's poem "The Hunting of the Snark". This is because the organic transmitter in Tarin Bul's head has been removed during his transformation. The Agent, Mr. Carroll, believes he now has enough information to know what the alien motives are, and what the Confederacy's likely response is to be. He submits his report to the Confederacy, in which he states his belief that the aliens, called the Altavar, are using the Warden worlds as incubators for their next generation of young, and that any threat to those worlds from the Confederacy would be viewed as genocide.

He next arranges a meeting of the Four Lords, the Confederacy representatives and the Altavar, for purposes of working out a peaceable solution. The Confederacy offers to cede control of the Warden Diamond to the aliens, and to not approach the system at all. The Altavar surprise the Confederacy by rejecting this. The Altavar cite the Confederacy's - and humanity's - long standing history of only honoring treaties until they feel safe enough to destroy the other party. This the Confederacy cannot deny, as it is too obviously true. The Altavar reluctantly offer a counter-proposal, one in which the Confederacy cease all its activities in space, and put every spaceship humanity has under the direct control of the Altavar for the next three centuries.

This is rejected out of hand, and the Altavar are told that unless they accept the Confederacy's proposal, that one of the Warden worlds - Medusa - will be destroyed. This does not go over well with Talant Ypsir, who realizes that he will no longer be a Lord. A week is given to evacuate the planet's population to Charon.

When the time runs out and the Confederacy attacks, a surprising thing happens. The planet, in the process of being destroyed, seems to shimmer, and a globe of an energy-like substance emerges and rushes at the fleet, destroying it. It turns out that there was a second alien race involved: the Coldah, who are planet-sized beings who enjoy merging with a planet and changing it into a human-habitable one for reasons known only to them. The Warden Organism is just a tool of theirs to do so. The Altavar were accidentally destroyed by the Coldah long ago, and after fighting it for centuries, gave up and became its assistants.

The book closes with the knowledge that the Confederacy will now be collapsing due to the reprisals of the Altavar, but holds out hope when it is revealed that the humans on the Warden worlds have a symbiosis and rapport with the Coldah that the Altavar had never achieved. It is speculated that a future humanity may have all the powers of those on the Warden worlds, the ability to create and destroy by force of mind, adapt to anything, and swap bodies at will.

The three copied agents are shown as being directed to the different points on their planets that will allow them to gain the most control over their Warden powers. And in the final scene, Mr. Carroll arranges a meeting with Talant Ypsir and Talant's two subordinates. When he tells "Ass" (his copy turned into a sexy female bodyguard) the names of the three, the subprogram psych command kicks in, and "she" kills all three of them.

In the end then, even Tarin fulfilled his mission.
