= Ghost of the Well of Souls =

2000 novel by Jack L. Chalker

- Author: Jack L. Chalker
- Language: English
- Genre: Science fiction
- Publisher: Del Rey Books
- Publication date: April 2000
- Publication place: United States
- Media type: Print (paperback)
- ISBN: 0-345-39485-2
- Preceded by: The Sea is Full of Stars

Ghost of the Well of Souls is the tenth and final novel in the Well of Souls series by American author Jack L. Chalker. It concludes the narrative begun in The Sea is Full of Stars.
