= The Sea Is Full of Stars =

1999 science fiction novel by Jack L. Chalker

- Author: Jack L. Chalker
- Language: English
- Genre: Science fiction
- Publisher: Del Rey Books
- Publication date: December 7, 1999
- Publication place: United States
- Media type: Print (paperback)
- ISBN: 0-345-39486-0
- Preceded by: Gods of the Well of Souls
- Followed by: Ghost of the Well of Souls

The Sea Is Full of Stars is the ninth novel in the Well of Souls series by American author Jack L. Chalker.
