= Exiles at the Well of Souls =

1978 novel by Jack L. Chalker

- First edition
- Author: Jack L. Chalker
- Cover artist: Darrell K. Sweet
- Language: English
- Genre: Science fiction
- Publisher: Del Rey
- Publication date: 1978
- Publication place: United States
- Media type: Print (paperback)
- ISBN: 0-7434-3603-2
- OCLC: 51738258
- Preceded by: Midnight at the Well of Souls
- Followed by: Quest for the Well of Souls

Exiles at the Well of Souls is the second book in the Well of Souls series by American author Jack L. Chalker. Originally intended to be one book, the story was split into Exiles and Quest for the Well of Souls forming a duology.

== Plot summary ==
Scientist Gilgram Zinder has finally decoded the ancient Markovian physics that controls our universe. Corrupt politician and drug dealer Antor Trelig is aware of Zinder's work through the efforts of Zinder's assistant, Ben Yulin. Trelig takes Zinder's daughter hostage and forces Zinder and Yulin to build a computer that can control the Markovian forces, like the dead Markovian computers that have been found on some planets. Zinder and Yulin construct "Obie", a sentient supercomputer, building it in Markovian fashion directly into Trelig's resort planetoid, New Pompeii.

Mavra Chang, freighter pilot and secret agent, is hired to rescue Zinder and halt Trelig's plans of universal conquest. In the process Obie accidentally makes contact with the Well World, which results in the entire planetoid being automatically transported into orbit around the Well World. Mavra and Zinder are aboard a spacecraft when this occurs, and find themselves flying over a "non-tech" hex. The Well World disables all of the technology on the ship and it crashes in the Southern Hemisphere. A war erupts on the Well World as the races of the nearby hexes race to collect all of the scattered pieces of the ship in order to escape the planet.

== Characters ==
- Dr. Gilgram Zinder, a scientist who unlocked the Markovian physics
- Ben Yulin, his assistant and an agent of Antor Trelig
- Obie, the sentient computer Zinder and Yulin built to manipulate the basic fabric of the universe
- Nikki Zinder, Gil's daughter
- Antor Trelig, a crooked politician
- Mavra Chang, a freighter captain
- Renard, librarian, sponge addict, and Nikki's guard on New Pompeii
- Serge Ortega, formerly a human freighter captain but now an Ulik, a six-armed being that is half-walrus, half-snake
