= Twilight at the Well of Souls =

1980 novel by Jack L. Chalker

- First edition
- Author: Jack L. Chalker
- Language: English
- Genre: Science fiction
- Publisher: Del Rey Books
- Publication date: 1980
- Publication place: United States
- Media type: Print (paperback)
- ISBN: 978-1-4165-0916-5
- OCLC: 61528688
- Preceded by: The Return of Nathan Brazil
- Followed by: Echoes of the Well of Souls

Twilight at the Well of Souls is the fifth novel in the Well of Souls series of science fiction novels by American author Jack L. Chalker. It concludes the narrative begun in the fourth book, The Return of Nathan Brazil.

== Plot summary ==
The plot of Twilight at the Well of Souls is a direct continuation of the plot of The Return of Nathan Brazil. As that novel concludes, guards at the South Zone of the Well World have killed Nathan Brazil.

Or have they? As Twilight at the Well of Souls opens, it turns out that Brazil is not killed so easily. Yet another being carrying Brazil's appearance is shot down by the guards, and the leader of Zone, Serge Ortega, is informed that the latest victim is the 27th of the current day. Ortega reveals that he has deduced that Brazil had actually entered several weeks before, even arriving prior to his companions Mavra Chang, Marquoz, and Yua (all of whom had been led to believe that Brazil had not yet journeyed to the Well World).

Marquoz has been busy in his short time on the Well World. After awakening as an armored war-lizard in Hakazit, he immediately insinuates himself into the local government. He learns that the government is a sort of dictatorship, but one in which anyone who assassinates the current leader is elevated to that position themself. Marquoz does not wish to take overall leadership, but he does assassinate and supplant the head of the secret police. He leverages this position and the Hakazit lust for war and combat to raise an army to fight on Brazil's behalf.

In contrast, Yua finds what seems like a hopeless situation in Awbri. The society there is dominated by the males, because every month the females go into heat (referred to as the Time) which can only be relieved by mating with a male. Just as Yua is despairing of being able to do her part to assist Brazil, she receives instructions which had been planted subconsciously by Obie. These instructions give Yua the recipe for making a hormonal replacement that will prevent the Time from occurring. Fortified with the means to gain control from the men, Yua sets about raising her own army.

Mavra prefers to begin in Dillia by journeying to the neighboring hex of Gedemondas. She recalls that during her previous visit to the Well World, she had seen that the inhabitants there had amazing mental powers, with the ability to control the thoughts of others. She believes that the Gedemondans would be powerful allies, and she wants to do something more than just sit and wait until she is called. Mavra is able to catch on with a hunting party headed by Colonel Asam, as Asam has heard the stories of Mavra's previous visit to the Well World and is also very interested in meeting a Gedemondan. Their party is waylaid near their first overnight rest stop in Gedemondas. Although they succeed in fighting off the attackers, several members of the party perish and Mavra is critically injured by a blow to the head, putting her in a coma for three days.

After turning the other wounded members of the group over to a rescue party, Mavra and Asam travel further into Gedemondas. At one of their rest stops, the Gedemondans arrive to meet them. Holding Mavra and Asam in thrall, the Gedemondans heal their wounds, then discuss the mission to repair the Well. Mavra asks for their assistance, but is not told whether it will be offered. The Gedemondans inform her of a council of war that will soon be conducted in the empty Gedemondan embassy in South Zone, and Mavra suggests that the fastest way to get there is via the Gedemondan Zone Gate. The Gedemondans take her and Asam there, though they do not allow either traveller to remember anything of the journey.

At the council, the three conspirators are reunited, and they learn of one another's new forms. The last member of the council is Gypsy, who inexplicably retains the same appearance as he had before arriving at the Well World. Gypsy informs the rest of the council of Brazil's early arrival on the Well World, and discusses the plan for misdirection of the search for Brazil. Gypsy demonstrates that he has the ability to morph into the same appearance as Brazil, capable of fooling any observer not aware of the switch. He informs the group that he will join their army at some point in the future in the guise of Brazil, with the intention of drawing attention away from the approach of the real Brazil to the Well.

== Reception ==
Dave Langford reviewed Twilight at the Well of Souls for White Dwarf #58, and stated that "brings the five-book space opera to a merciful end, and – despite making the blowing-up of the whole universe a rather dull affair – is a better read than the previous three."
