= Cerberus: A Wolf in the Fold =

1982 novel by Jack L. Chalker

- Author: Jack L. Chalker
- Cover artist: David B. Mattingly
- Language: English
- Genre: Science fiction
- Publisher: Del Rey
- Publication date: 1982
- Publication place: United States
- Media type: Print (Paperback)
- ISBN: 0-345-35247-5
- OCLC: 277005501
- Preceded by: Lilith: A Snake in the Grass
- Followed by: Charon: A Dragon at the Gate

Cerberus: A Wolf in the Fold is a science fiction novel by American writer Jack L. Chalker. First published as a paperback in 1982, it is the second book in the Four Lords of the Diamond series. It continues the saga started in Lilith: A Snake in the Grass, and is followed by Charon: A Dragon at the Gate and Medusa: A Tiger by the Tail.

== Setting ==
The Confederacy is a collection of human-populated worlds in which all members are biologically and socially engineered to be perfect and docile citizens in a materialistic utopia. Any alien worlds that the Confederation comes across are assimilated or eliminated. Not wishing to stagnate, the Confederacy continually expands, and the worlds of the Frontier have humans of unaltered genetics.

Despite the Confederacy's best efforts, there are always criminals. Over-ambitious politicians, too powerful religious leaders, and the usual white-collar criminals and violent offenders. To track down such people, the Confederacy has bred Assassins, who are assigned to deal with such. Often that involves killing the offenders or giving them a brain wipe and new personality. However, the best of the criminal elite are exiled to the Warden Diamond - those with connections, or those who may have information that insures that powerful people will protect them.

The Warden Diamond is the Confederacy's penal colony. It is four human habitable worlds circling a single star, and that has a unique organism, the Warden Organism that is a microscopic symbiotic lifeform. When one is exposed to it, it takes up residence in each cell of one's body, generally improving it and seeing to the body's continued health. It can also give a person additional powers, that vary depending on which variety they have been exposed to and how well their mind can be in tune with the vague collective consciousness of the organism. Due to the fact that people die if they are taken out of the Warden System, it is thought to be the perfect penal colony, as escape is impossible.

The Confederacy has learned in the first book that an alien race of unknown power, size or location has discovered them. And has managed to have human looking robots infiltrate the Confederacy to access data on the military capabilities of mankind. The aliens are apparently getting inside information from the criminal bosses who run the Warden Diamond. An Assassin, whose name is never given in the entire series, but who calls himself "Mr. Carroll" in the last book, was called in as he is the best they have.

It was explained to him that his department will be taking a mindprint of him and placing it in the bodies of four condemned criminals. That way, one of "him" can be sent to each of the Warden worlds, with the plan of assassinating each of the Four Lords of the Diamond. This will destabilize things and buy the Confederacy time to prepare against the alien menace. "Mr. Carroll" will be in a picket ship outside the contamination zone of the Warden Diamond, and have each of the agent's experiences uploaded into his mind, by means of an organic transmitter that each carries in his brain.

In this way, he can collate all the data from each world, as from his perspective he will have "lived" on each through his surrogates. He is aided in this by a self-aware computer, who is his partner, and in some ways, his overseer.

Having received the first report from Lilith in the first book, the second book describes the report he now receives from Cerberus.

== Plot summary ==
"He" wakes up on a prison ship, and discovers that "he" is a copy. But he receives another shock, as he discovers that he is in a woman's body, a criminal named Qwin Zhang, who was mindwiped so that his recording could be inserted. He quickly learns that this is not an insurmountable problem, as the Warden powers on this planet are such that everyone has them, but it manifests itself as body swapping, a process that occurs when both parties are asleep. The Warden Organisms exchange information pertaining to memories and personality, so that if given sufficient time, the two sleepers will fully exchange bodies. The agent arranges to sleep next to a male during the newcomer orientation, and so has a male body again. He also learns that Cerberus is covered completely in water, with the only "land" being the tops of underwater trees that grow tall enough to extend beyond the water's surface.

Given that Cerberus is a world of white collar criminals, and that their technology is 20 years behind the times, "Qwin" can do quite well, and quickly establishes himself as "president" of a minor subsidiary of a large company. He does this with the help of Dylan Kohl, a boat captain, and Sanda Tyne, a host mother. Host mothering is an important profession, as the body swapping allows for people to live forever, so long as there are enough new bodies to swap with.

After a series of improbable adventures that gain him the position of company president, he attempts to carry out his mission of assassinating Wagant Laroo, the Lord of Cerberus. In the process of this, he comes across Dr. Dumonia, a psychologist who is later revealed to be a part-time Confederacy agent, though not especially loyal at all times. Qwin also learns that the human imitating robots are given human minds on Cerberus, specifically on Wagant's island. With the help of his friends, he manages to get on that island, and even arranges to come up with the solution to a problem of Wagant's.

The problem Wagant had was that the robots are better in every way, and nearly immortal and invulnerable. But Wagant does not want to put his mind into one, as the aliens who provide the robots have hidden commands in them that make the person the slave of the aliens. Not being able to get rid of those commands, Wagant accepts Qwin's help in getting rid of those commands. Qwin does so by asking his over-Agent in the picket ship to do so, which not only gets him in good with Wagant, but lets the Confederacy have a sample of the robot body and brain for examination.

Wagant, while very untrusting of Qwin, does eventually transfer his mind into the body of a "cleared" robot. What Wagant doesn't realize is that it wasn't quite fully cleared, and when Qwin recites a Lewis Carroll poem in front of him, it places Wagant under Qwin's complete control. Thus assassination is not necessary, as Qwin and Dumonia are in effect the rulers of Cerberus.

The book closes with the Agent in the picket ship feeling more concerned, as he saw himself change again, this time putting other people above his own needs and mission. This increases his turmoil and soul searching.

The saga continues in the third book of the series, called Charon: A Dragon at the Gate.
