= The Devil's Voyage =

1981 novel by Jack L. Chalker

- First edition
- Author: Jack L. Chalker
- Language: English
- Publisher: Doubleday Books
- Publication date: January 1, 1981
- Publication place: United States
- Media type: Print (hardback & paperback)
- ISBN: 0-3851-5284-1
- OCLC: 1033669324

The Devil's Voyage (Doubleday, 1981) is a historical novel by science fiction writer Jack Chalker. It describes the final voyage of the heavy cruiser USS Indianapolis, which was sunk during World War II in the Pacific by Japanese submarine action, with the loss of many of the initial survivors to sharks.

The novel postulates that the War Department's interest in Astounding Science Fiction Magazine, because of the publication of fictional stories postulating nuclear research programs similar to the historical Manhattan Project, prompted Russian spies to early knowledge of the US nuclear weapons program, eventually leading to the sinking of the Indianapolis because of the possibility it was carrying one of the early atomic bombs to use against Japan.
