= The Return of Nathan Brazil =

1980 novel by Jack L. Chalker

- First edition
- Author: Jack L. Chalker
- Language: English
- Genre: Science fiction
- Publisher: Del Rey Books
- Publication date: 1980
- Publication place: United States
- Media type: Print (paperback)
- ISBN: 0-345-29767-9
- Preceded by: Quest for the Well of Souls
- Followed by: Twilight at the Well of Souls

The Return of Nathan Brazil is the fourth book in the Well of Souls series by American author Jack L. Chalker.

== Plot summary ==
A viral species named the Dreel, originating from outside the Milky Way galaxy, invades human territory. The central human government, known as the Com, attempts to fight back, but finds that their resources are inadequate to repel the invaders. In desperation, the records of the work of Gilgram Zinder (who had discovered the superimposed Markovian reality and built the sentient supercomputer Obie to manipulate it) are unsealed and his work is reproduced. Lacking the time to develop the technology fully, the Com builds ships called Zinder Nullifiers, which simply erase the contents of the space that they are pointed at. When they make the final stand against the Dreel invasion fleet, the Nullifiers are switched on and left on, obliterating the Dreel fleet. However, something unexpected then occurs, as the void in space begins to grow, erasing everything in its path from existence.

At this point, Mavra Chang and Obie are reintroduced. It has been over 700 years since Obie faked his destruction and ran away with Mavra, and they are currently in another galaxy trying to positively influence the development of an intelligent civilization. Obie senses the malfunction in the Well World when the anomaly forms and begins to expand. He travels to the Well World, determines that it is broken and requires repair. He determines that the only person able to effect such repair is Nathan Brazil, but notes that the Well should have summoned Brazil to fix the malfunction. Obie recalls that Brazil was suffering from memory loss the last time he journeyed to the Well World; worried that this may have recurred, he and Mavra set out to locate Brazil.

Once back in the Milky Way, Mavra and Obie have a problem: Brazil doesn't want to be found. The amazonian superwomen that Ben Yulin forced Obie to create, known as Olympians, founded a religious cult based on the godhood of Nathan Brazil. Their population has expanded to fill an entire planet, with the women serving as emissaries for the cult. In the face of their dogged pursuit, Brazil has gone underground. Undeterred, Mavra and Obie join forces with a mysterious human named Gypsy and his miniature dragon companion (and Com agent) Marquoz to recruit a group of Olympians to try to track down Brazil. In the process, Mavra is quite surprised to find that one of the "founding mothers" of the religion, Gilgam Zinder's daughter Nikki, is still "alive" as a computer personality. Convinced that Obie remained in the control of Yulin, and that Mavra had perished seven centuries earlier, Nikki believes that Mavra's approach is a trick, and she sets out to double-cross Mavra and Obie.

Eventually, the investigators are able to track Brazil to a freighter operating in the space of the centaur-like Rhone (Dillians on the Well World). Despite the attempted interference of the Olympians, the party is able to meet with Brazil and discuss the situation with him. They find that he is very much in command of his faculties, and had not travelled to fix the Well because he didn't want to. Brazil informs them that in order to fix the malfunction, it would be necessary to temporarily shut down the Well of Souls, which would bring the Universe to the same end as if the rift in space were allowed to expand indefinitely. Although there would be a chance that the Well would short out beyond repair in the next few millennia, Brazil is willing to take the chance to give the races well beyond the reach of the rift the opportunity to achieve greatness.

Obie disagrees with this assessment. By his calculation, Brazil is underestimating the odds of failure, and overestimating how much longer the Well can persist. Obie argues that the Universe will end regardless, but if Brazil acts now, he will be able to restart it afterwards, and use the Well to reseed it with intelligent life. Obie proposes to use his own immense capabilities to reprogram the entire planet full of Olympians to travel to the Well World, acting as both as foot soldiers in the inevitable fight against Brazil's return to the Well World, and also as the massive seed population needed when the Universe is restarted. Although Brazil remains reluctant, he is ultimately enfolded within Obie and forced to see the machine's logic. Brazil finally agrees to go along with the plan, but on one condition: he will go into the Well of Souls and perform the necessary repairs, but only on the orders of another person, so that the responsibility for the billions of lives ended is not his alone.

With the plan thus laid out, the inner circle of Chang, Gypsy, Marquoz, and an Olympian head priestess named Yua travel to the Well World to put it into effect. Brazil indicates that he will follow sometime later, as he does not expect to receive a warm welcome. Although Obie is no longer able to help the party, he does impart them with a hint to the Well to influence the species that they are transformed into.

Upon arrival at the Well World, the party arrives at the South Zone, where they are met by Serge Ortega. Ortega is a former human, transformed by the Well into a Ulik, a six-armed being that is half man, half snake. Although his species has a relatively short lifetime, Ortega has taken advantage of Well "magic" to obtain an unlimited lifespan, but this "spell" lasts only as long as he remains in the Zone. Mavra risks telling Ortega about the crisis in the Well of Souls and the impending arrival of the Olympians and Nathan Brazil. Ortega was present the last time Brazil went into the Well of Souls, and he believes that Brazil was not God, as Brazil claimed, but a megalomaniac who might do real damage if he were allowed to re-enter the Well.

As the novel closes, Mavra, Marquoz, and Yua have arrived at their new hexes and are beginning to find their bearings. Marquoz is in Hakazit, a high-tech, volcanic land of massive armored lizards (though not firebreathers, to his disappointment). Yua is in Awbri, a nontechnological land of arboreal mammals in which the society is dominated by males. Mavra is in Dillia, semitechnological land of the centaurs. Gypsy resurfaces in an ocean hex, curiously untransformed. As the first waves of Olympians begin to pass through zone, an alarm sounds, and Serge Ortega is summoned to find that his guards have killed Nathan Brazil.

== Characters ==
- The Dreel, a viral hive-mind species
- Gypsy, a mysterious human
- Marquoz, his companion, a 2-foot-tall (0.61 m), fire-breathing lizard
- Mavra Chang, a former freighter captain now acting as the captain of New Harmony
- Obie, the sentient computer built by Ben Yulin and Gilgam Zinder to manipulate the basic fabric of the universe, now acting as Mavra's partner
- Yua, Olympian high priestess, she looks like a human (with a horse tail) but is far more capable
- Nathan Brazil, a Jewish freighter captain who might be God
- Serge Ortega, a former freighter captain reborn as a Ulik, a six-armed being that is half-man, half-snake

== Reception ==
Dave Langford reviewed The Return of Nathan Brazil for White Dwarf #52, and stated that "it's back to the old bad days of SF, without even E E Smith's boyish enthusiasm to make the nonsense work. Can Penguin's long-standing reputation for good taste in SF survive this brutal assault?"

== Reviews ==
- Review by Joseph Nicholas (1984) in Paperback Inferno, Volume 7, Number 5
