= Midnight at the Well of Souls =

1977 novel by Jack L. Chalker

- First edition
- Author: Jack L. Chalker
- Cover artist: H. R. Van Dongen
- Language: English
- Genre: Science fiction
- Publisher: Del Rey
- Publication date: 1977
- Publication place: United States
- Media type: Print (paperback)
- ISBN: 0-7434-3522-2
- OCLC: 49523539
- Followed by: Exiles at the Well of Souls

Midnight at the Well of Souls is the first book in the Well of Souls series by American author Jack L. Chalker, first published as a paperback in 1977. Over a million copies of the original printing were sold, and reprints have continued for decades. It came in #18 in the 1978 Locus Poll Award for best science fiction.

== Plot summary ==
=== Preamble ===
Elkinos Skander is an archaeologist stationed on the planet of Dalgonia. The planet was formerly occupied by the long-dead Markovian race, who are known only for the planet-sized computers they built into the crust of the planets they inhabited. He leads a group of students studying the ruins. Skander unlocks the mystery of the apparently dead computer. One of the students, patterned (and named) after a brilliant mathematician named Varnett, sees Skander interacting with the computer and confronts him. The two conclude that the computer runs on a form of energy unknown to human physics, forming the basic unified field that governs the existence of the universe.

The rest of the team discovers a surface anomaly near the north pole of the planet, where a hexagonal "hole" appears for a brief interval every day. Skander and Varnett both believe that they will be able to use this anomaly to access the planetary computer, and both set off to attempt to take control. Trying to protect the discovery, Skander stops at the team's camp and murders them. By the time he arrives at the anomaly, Varnett has already prepared for his arrival and the two struggle on the surface. They are swallowed up by the anomaly when it reopens.

Meanwhile, the interstellar freighter Stehekin is transporting three passengers and grain intended for famine relief. The passengers are a businessman named Datham Hain, his "niece" Wu Julee, and a diplomatic courier identified as Vardia Diplo 1261. During the trip, the ship's captain, Nathan Brazil, discovers that Hain is a "sponge merchant", a trafficker in a substance that causes an incurable, degenerative brain disease. Using the threat of withholding the arresting agent, the substance can be used to gain power over those it infects. Hain keeps Wu Julee as an example of what happens in this case; she has regressed to a mental age of five and will eventually be turned into a vegetable and allowed to die.

Brazil diverts the Stehekin from its course, in an attempt to reach the planet where the alien substance originated to obtain the retardant. Before they arrive, Brazil receives a distress call from Dalgonia and detours to investigate. There, they find the seven students murdered by Skander. Subsequently, the entire party travels to the polar gate, and while they are investigating there, the anomaly reopens and they are transported to the Well World.

=== Well World ===
The Well World is a Markovian construct that stabilizes the equation of our universe. Like Dalgonia, the planet consists largely of an enormous computer that can interact with and control the forces of nature. The surface has been patterned into a series of hexagonal patches where Markovians were allowed to experiment in creating their own new forms of intelligent life, and if they were successful they would be sent off into the universe to evolve on their own. Another Markovian was then allowed to try their hand at species design in the now-empty hex. The planet still contains 1,560 races that were on the Well World when the Markovians disappeared.

At the Well World, Brazil and his companions set off to track down Skander and Varnett, to stop them from gaining access to the central computer and causing harm to the universe. The complication is that travelling through the polar gate on Dalgonia has transformed all of the humans, with the exception of Nathan Brazil, into members of the various species which inhabit the planet.

As the book continues, Brazil comes to realize that his existence is not as it appears, and memories start to surface.

== Characters ==
- Elkinos Skander, a brilliant (and psychotic) archaeologist
- Varnett, a brilliant mathematician
- Nathan Brazil, an unassuming freighter captain with a mysterious past
- Datham Hain, a sponge trafficker
- Wu Julee, his servant
- Vardia Diplo 1261, a diplomatic courier
- Serge Ortega, a former freighter captain reborn as a Ulik, a six-armed being that is half-walrus, half-snake
