= Dance Band on the Titanic (collection) =

1988 collection of short stories by Jack L. Chalker

- Cover of first edition
- Author: Jack L. Chalker
- Cover artist: Darrell K. Sweet
- Language: English
- Genre: Speculative fiction
- Publisher: Del Rey Books
- Publication date: 1988
- Publication place: United States
- Media type: print (paperback)
- Pages: 339
- ISBN: 0-345-34858-3

Dance Band on the Titanic is a collection of speculative fiction short stories by American writer Jack L. Chalker. It was first published in paperback by Del Rey Books in July 1988.

== Summary ==
The book collects seven works of short fiction, two original to the collection, together with an introduction and few nonfiction pieces by the author. It gathers together the majority of his short fiction, Chalker being primarily a novelist.

== Contents ==
- "Introduction: The Writing Game"
- "No Hiding Place" (from Stellar #3, October 1977)
- "Where Do You Get Those Crazy Ideas?"
- "Forty Days and Nights in the Wilderness" (from Analog Science Fiction/Science Fact, v. 98, no. 7, July 1978)
- "Dance Band on the Titanic" (from Isaac Asimov's Science Fiction Magazine, v. 2, no. 4, July/August 1978)
- "Stormsong Runner" (from Whispers II, August 1979)
- "In the Dowaii Chambers" (from The John W. Campbell Awards, Volume 5, January 1984)
- "Adrift Among the Ghosts"
- "Moths and Candle"
- "Afterwords: On Transformations and Other Last Words"
- "The Official Jack L. Chalker Handout Bibliography"
- "Brief Biographical Notes for the Interested"

== Awards ==
Dance Band on the Titanic placed twelfth in the 1989 Locus Poll Award for Best Collection.

== Reception ==
The collection was reviewed by Don D'Ammassa in Science Fiction Chronicle v. 9, no. 11 (issue #107), August 1988, and Edward Bryant in Rod Serling's The Twilight Zone Magazine v. 8, no. 6, February 1989.
