= Formula fiction =

Literature following a predictable form

Illustration of the hero's journey

In popular culture, formula fiction is literature in which the storylines and plots have been reused to the extent that the narratives are predictable. It is similar to genre fiction, which identifies a number of specific settings that are frequently reused. The label of formula fiction is used in literary criticism as a mild pejorative to imply lack of originality.

== Varieties ==
The formula is defined specifically by predictable narrative structure. Formulaic tales incorporate plots that have been reused so often as to be easily recognizable. Perhaps the most clearly formulaic plots characterize the romantic comedy genre; in a book or film labeled as such, viewers already know its most basic central plot, including to some extent the ending. This does not always prove to be detrimental to a given work's reception however, as the popularity of the aforementioned genre demonstrates.

Formula fiction is often stereotypically associated with early pulp magazine markets, though some works published in that medium, such as "The Cold Equations", subvert the supposed expectations of the common narrative formula of that time.

== Distinct from genre conventions ==
The formula is limited to structure of the plot itself. It does not include conventional, stereotypical elements of the genre used for the story background. Genres like high fantasy, westerns, and space opera (an adventure story in a science fiction setting) often have specific settings, such as a pseudo-Medieval European setting, the Old West, or outer space.

For any given genre, certain assumed background information covers the nature and purpose of predictable elements of the story, such as the appearance of dragons and wizards in high fantasy, warp drives and rayguns in science fiction, or shootouts at high noon in Westerns. These are taken as conventional in the genre and do not need to be explained anew to the reader, they may be included implicitly as part of the genre's formula, but they do not constitute the plot structure that makes a story formulaic.

Note however that stereotypical elements can also easily be treated subversively, to contradict some of the expectations inherent in the genre's formula.

== Distinct from pastiche fiction ==
Formula fiction should not be confused with pastiche: Fiction mimicking another work or author's style. Comedy as a whole – including parody, satire, and subgenres such as romantic comedy – often relies on either formulaic elements, or mocking contradiction of such elements.

Though pastiche may naturally include formulaic elements, the same holds true of parody and satire. All may well include formulaic elements such as common stereotypes or caricatures, or which may use formulaic elements in order to mock them or point out their supposedly cliché or unrealistic natures.

== See also ==
- Film genre
- Literary fiction
