= Lilith: A Snake in the Grass =

1981 science fiction novel by Jack L. Chalker

- First edition
- Author: Jack L. Chalker
- Cover artist: David B. Mattingly
- Language: English
- Series: Four Lords of the Diamond
- Genre: Science fiction novel
- Publisher: Del Rey Books
- Publication date: 1981
- Publication place: United States
- Media type: Print (Paperback)
- ISBN: 0-345-29369-X
- OCLC: 7779152
- LC Class: CPB Box no. 2513 vol. 17
- Followed by: Cerberus: A Wolf in the Fold

Lilith: A Snake in the Grass is a 1981 science fiction novel by American writer Jack L. Chalker. It is the first book in his Four Lords of the Diamond series.

== Plot summary ==
The Confederacy, a massive space empire, duplicates the personality of its best agent and implants it into four brain-dead hosts. These hosts are sent to the four planets of a penal colony, the Warden Diamond, to investigate an alien threat and assassinate the four lords of the planets, the "Four Lords of the Diamond." The original agent is on a picket ship and downloads information from his copies.

A copy of the agent wakes up in the body of "Cal Tremon," a criminal on a prison ship heading to Lilith. He must then adapt to Lilith, a beautiful tropical world where its Warden Organism, a symbiotic microorganism, destroys all non-Lilith material, making modernization very difficult. Thus, the several million inhabitants of Lilith's feudal society are serfs. The nobility of Lilith are the few who can control the organisms.

The agent thus finds himself a serf, with no hope of advancing unless he harnesses the power of the Warden Organisms. When a girl he liked was being taken away for experimentation, he taps into his Warden powers and kills the overseer, a petty tyrant.

While living in the Castle, the residence of the Duke, Cal gains some initial training and knowledge. He escapes when he learns that the nobles plan to kill him. Outside of the castle walls, he gains a secure status in Lilith's society and no longer desires to serve the Confederacy.

Instead, he realizes that the Lord of Lilith, Marek Kreegan, a former Assassin of the Confederacy, cooperates with the aliens to preserve peace and order. Cal learns that Kreegan dissuaded the aliens from a genocide against humanity, choosing the slower course of subversion and sabotage instead. Cal does not kill Kreegan. His girlfriend, believing that Kreegan's death would will elevate Cal to Lordship, kills Kreegan by using a potion to draw on Cal's power.

The Agent wakes up in the picket ship, worried about his duplicate's behavior in Lilith.

== Reception ==
Library Journal said that "All sf collections should include this first volume in a new series by the author of the "Well World" books."

Peter Gottlieb from The Morning Call said: "The novel seems to be an expansion of a novellette which occupies the central part of the book, but there are enough intrigue, "empire building" and assorted "perils of Pauline" to keep a reader going through slow patches."

Greg Costikyan reviewed Lilith: A Snake in the Grass in Ares Magazine #12 and commented that "Chalker's prose is stilted, but his ideas are exciting. Worth buying if you don't mind forced writing."

W. Ritchie Benedict from Science Fiction Review said: "There are many familiar elements in this book: game playing; sword and sorcery; fantasy; science fiction, even Gor. But somehow it all hangs together and makes an entertaining novel. It will be interesting to see how the remaining three worlds are developed."

Dan Davidson from the Whitehorse Daily Star said: "On the one hand it is a rousing adventure on a alien planet, a story which Chalker always tells well. On the other it is a tale of a man's enlightenment, and he does that one equally well. Lilith is a very enjoyable opening shot to a new series. I'm looking forward to the rest of it."

Wiley Hall from The Baltimore Evening Sun noted that the book "Features good aliens, a mystery, action and fair to middling character development."

David Pringle in The Ultimate Guide to Science Fiction calls the book "Routine action sf conceived to fit this author's customary over-extended series format."

James Davis Nicoll for Tor.com said: "This offers pretty much every Chalkerian trope, particularly unwanted physical transformation. It is a reasonable sampler of his works. Be aware that it's book one of four, and nothing really gets resolved in this adventure. I should add that this really isn't recommended, unless you're already a diehard Chalker fan."

== Reviews ==
- Review by Alan Fraser (1990) in Paperback Inferno, #85
