= Fort Scott (Flint River, Georgia) =

Historic fort in Georgia, USA

- Bainbridge, Georgia in United States
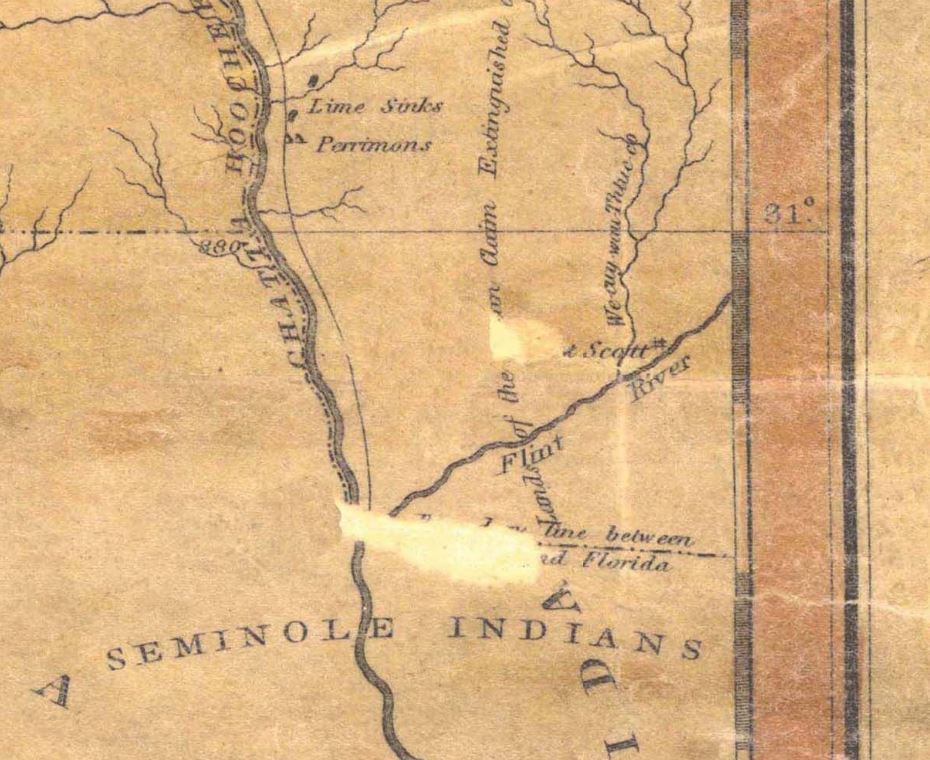
- John Melish 1818 map showing Fort Scott

Site information
- Type: Stockade fort
- Owner: Private
- Controlled by: Private
- Open to the public: No
- Condition: Submerged

Location
- Location within Georgia Location within the United States
- Coordinates: 30°46′33″N 84°46′02″W

Site history
- Built: 1816
- In use: 1816-1821
- Battles/wars: Battle of Fowltown

Fort Scott was built in 1816 on the west bank of the Flint River, where it joins the Chattahoochee River to form the Apalachicola, in the southwest corner of Georgia. It was named for Lieutenant Richard W. Scott, who was killed in the Scott Massacre of 1817 and never known to have visited the fort. (The fort replaced a much smaller fort or stockade, named Camp Crawford for Secretary of War William H. Crawford, and not to be confused with Fort Crawford (Alabama).) The need for a fort became evident during the War of 1812, when the British identified the undefended United States border and in 1814 built two forts on the Apalachicola River into which the Flint River flows: a strong fort at Prospect Bluff and a smaller one, Nicolls' Outpost, at the river juncture. This was in Spanish Florida, but Spain had neither the resources nor the inclination to do anything about the fort in a location that was remote.

== The Negro Fort (1816) ==
However, the end of the War of 1812 in 1815 meant the fort from which to attack the United States was no longer needed. When withdrawing in 1815, the British deliberately left what was soon called the Negro Fort, with all its weapons and ordnance, in the hands of those disciplined, paid-off Corps of Colonial Marines black troops who chose to remain. Surrounding it was a sizeable community of runaway slaves, Red Stick Creeks (some of whom were forced out of the Mississippi Territory and Georgia), and the occasional white trader. The existence of a Negro Fort, as the U.S. Army called it, was anathema to Georgia plantation owners, who feared this threat to their slaves. It was a known safe destination for runaway slaves from as far as Virginia and Tennessee. Raids from lawless Spanish Florida into U.S. territory, calling on slaves to follow them to freedom, are well documented.

The only practical way to supply Fort Scott was by river; a land route would have had to go through wilderness, and was not seriously considered. Instead, the Apalachicola River was used. At the same time, the Americans, now able to reconnoitre the Negro Fort, concluded that it would be very difficult to assault by land. It had been excellently situated and well built.

Two concerns about the Apalachicola River reinforced each other. On the one hand, artillery of sufficient size to destroy the fort would have to be brought in by boat, so U.S. gunboats, stored in Pass Christian after their successful use in the Battle of New Orleans, were sent for. On the other hand, supply boats to or from Fort Scott had to pass right in front of the Negro Fort. As they were fired upon, this conveniently provided the casus belli. U.S. forces attacked and destroyed the fort in the Battle of Negro Fort (1816)—sometimes called the opening battle of the Seminole Wars. (There is disagreement about just when the First Seminole War began; it was not recognized as a war until much later.)

== Fort Scott abandoned and then rebuilt (1816–1817) ==
In 1816, Georgia Governor David B. Mitchell asked U.S. Army General Edmund S. Gaines to put the 4th Infantry at Fort Scott to prevent White squatters from entering Muscogee and Seminole land. Gaines had not only ordered the fort abandoned but concealed the fact that he had done so from civilian leadership; Mitchell found out when he visited the fort in person and discovered it empty. Gaines moved the soldiers who had been at Fort Scott to Mobile "in case of a Spanish counteroffensive against the rumored filibuster against Pensacola."

Once Negro Fort was destroyed in August, 1816, there seemed to be no more need for Fort Scott, and it was abandoned in November of 1816. Red Stick warriors soon burned the fort to the ground. The U.S. Army sent Captain Samuel Donoho in June, 1817, assisted in July by Brevet Major David E. Twiggs and his company from the 7th U.S. Infantry, to rebuild it. Protection along the U.S.–Florida border proved to still be necessary, even though the War of 1812 was over; raids were regularly launched into Georgia from Spanish Florida by Red Sticks, other Seminoles, and maroons (escaped slaves). Fort Scott would remain staffed until Florida actually became a U.S. territory in November of 1821. "Unlike smaller posts such as Fort Gaines and Fort Hughes, the fort was a massive affair designed to house a full brigade of U.S. troops," and it would remain staffed by "a large force" until 1821. It was "the supply and logistics base for operations during the First Seminole War."

== Battle of Fowltown (1817) ==
Fort Scott was the base for the Battle of Fowltown, another candidate for the first battle of the Seminole Wars. (Note that there were four different locations for Fowltown, which was forced to move four times in three years; the attack was on the third Fowltown, just south of modern Bainbridge, Georgia.) The Red Stick Chief Neamathla visited Major Twiggs soon after his arrival and warned him not to cross the Flint River. He maintained that the land to the south of the river belonged to the Red Stick Mikasuki Creeks, who had not been party to the Treaty of Fort Jackson, ceding this land to the United States, and did not feel bound by it. In fact, they took the Flint River as separating the United States from Spanish Florida.

The Secretary of War, John C. Calhoun, ordered General Gaines to remove Neamathla and his followers from this land. A road was cut from Fort Gaines, on the north. Additional support from Mobile was on its way up the Apalachicola River. When General Gaines and troops from Fort Gaines arrived at Fort Scott on November 19, 1817, he ordered Major Twiggs to go to Fowltown and bring back Neamathla and his leading men. Twiggs left November 20 and reached Fowltown (the third Fowltown) the next morning. While shots were exchanged, called by some the first shots of the Seminole War, neither side scored a victory. The Americans failed to capture Neamathla, but his tribe of Mikasuki abandoned the land the U.S. claimed did not belong to them. Another clash took place on November 23. A blockhouse named Fort Hughes was built in modern Bainbridge, Georgia, close to Fowltown.

== Scott massacre (November, 1817) ==
A direct result a few days later was the Scott Massacre, an attack by the Red Sticks on the vessel of Lieutenant Richard W. Scott, coming up the Apalachicola River headed for what was then Camp Crawford. Only 7 of the 45 on the boat survived. The news of this attack was widely reported in the U.S. press and contributed to President James Monroe's order to General Andrew Jackson to "punish" the Red Sticks regardless of whether they were in U.S. or Florida territory. The Camp, which he never visited, was renamed Fort Scott in his honor. It also served both symbolically and logistically as the foundation of the First Seminole War.

== Battle of Ocheesee and subsequent siege (December 1817–March 1818) ==
This was followed, on December 15, by the Battle of Ocheesee. Josiah Francis (Francis the Prophet), ally of Neamathla, succeeded in pinning down a supply convoy headed up the Apalachicola River for Fort Gaines and Fort Scott. Warriors from both sides of the river fired on the boats simultaneously, and the sailors could not show themselves to navigate. The siege was not broken until mid-March, 1818, when Andrew Jackson marched south from Fort Gaines to Fort Scott, and from there to the former Negro Fort, where he ordered Fort Gadsden to be constructed.

== Second abandonment of Fort Scott (1821) ==
Both Fort Scott and the Fort Gadsden which replaced the destroyed Negro Fort were expensive to keep supplied ("the more remote the post, the higher the expense"). Many men got ill from what at the time were believed to be "bad airs" (mal-aria). Starting in 1820 Fort Scott's soldiers were besieged by what is now recognized as malaria, yellow fever, and the resultant dysentery; in 1820, 769 of the 780 soldiers at the post were ill. "Soldiers considered the fort to be the deadliest military assignment in the country because of numerous illnesses and deaths there." The causes of these diseases spread by mosquitoes, much less treatment or prevention, were not known until later in the nineteenth century, and sending sick soldiers to Fort Gadsden actually spread the diseases. Fort Scott was evacuated (abandoned) September 27–28, 1821, the month the treaty took effect.

The site of Fort Scott is under the manmade Lake Seminole.

== Camp Recovery ==
On a high hill across the Flint River from Fort Scott was Camp Recovery, created when Thomas Lawson, a camp doctor and future Surgeon General, decided to move on September 18, 1820, about 70 invalid soldiers "likely to be benefitted by a change of air". Partly because of heavy rains, soldiers died rather than recovered, and a number are buried in the vicinity, though the graves have not been located. It was abandoned November 23, 1820.
