= List of shipwrecks in April 1841 =

The list of shipwrecks in April 1841 includes ships sunk, foundered, wrecked, grounded, or otherwise lost during April 1841.

== 1 April ==
List of shipwrecks: 1 April 1841
Ship	State	Description
Wellington	United Kingdom	The smack was wrecked at Drogheda, County Louth with the loss of five of her seven crew.

== 2 April ==
List of shipwrecks: 2 April 1841
Ship	State	Description
Douro	United Kingdom	The ship was wrecked at the mouth of the Gironde River. She was on a voyage from Sunderland, County Durham to Bordeaux, Gironde, France.
Majestic	United Kingdom	The brig was wrecked on Tiree, Outer Hebrides with the loss of four of her crew. She was on a voyage from London to Londonderry.
Thomas Green	United Kingdom	The ship was wrecked at the mouth of the Gironde River. She was on a voyage from Sunderland to Bordeaux.

== 3 April ==
List of shipwrecks: 3 April 1841
Ship	State	Description
Nestor	Flag unknown	The ship ran aground on the Lappe Grund, off the coast of Denmark. She was on a voyage from Cette, Hérault, France to Riga, Russia.

== 6 April ==
List of shipwrecks: 6 April 1841
Ship	State	Description
Elizabeth	United Kingdom	The ship was wrecked on the Poor Knight Rocks. All on board were rescued. She was on a voyage from Sydney, New South Wales to New Zealand.

== 7 April ==
List of shipwrecks: 7 April 1841
Ship	State	Description
Margaretha	United States	The ship was reported to have been driven ashore in the Scheldt. She was on a voyage from Baltimore, Maryland to Antwerp, Belgium. Other sources state that she was not driven ashore.
Morgensterne	Belgium	The ship was driven ashore in the Scheldt. She was refloated.
Sydney	United Kingdom	The ship ran aground in the Victoria Channel, in Liverpool Bay. She was on a voyage from Liverpool, Lancashire to Jamaica. Sydney was refloated and put back to Liverpool.
Triton	United Kingdom	The ship foundered 10 nautical miles (19 km) off St. Ives, Cornwall. Her crew were rescued. she was on a voyage from Newport, Monmouthshire to Plymouth, Devon.

== 8 April ==
List of shipwrecks: 8 April 1841
Ship	State	Description
Carrywell	United Kingdom	The ship was driven ashore and wrecked near Ballyshannon, County Donegal.
Dido	United Kingdom	The ship was driven ashore at Figueira da Foz, Portugal. She was on a voyage from Figueira da Foz to Newfoundland, British North America. Dido was refloated and taken into Figueira da Foz.
Tally Ho!	United Kingdom	The ship was driven ashore west of "Faro Point". She was on a voyage from the Baltic to Messina, Sicily. Tally Ho! was refloated on 10 April.

== 9 April ==
List of shipwrecks: 9 April 1841
Ship	State	Description
Corinna	United Kingdom	The ship ran aground on the Herd Sand, in the North Sea off the coast of County Durham. She was on a voyage from South Shields to Great Yarmouth, Norfolk. Corinna was refloated and resumed her voyage.
Lady Stormont	United Kingdom	The ship ran aground on Mud Point and capsized. Her crew were rescued. She was on a voyage from Calcutta, India to Liverpool, Lancashire.

== 10 April ==
List of shipwrecks: 10 April 1841
Ship	State	Description
Gertrude	(United Kingdom of Great Britain and Ireland) British North America	The ship capsized and sank at Antigonish, Nova Scotia. She was later refloated.
Irish Lass	United Kingdom	The ship was wrecked on the coast of Brazil 100 nautical miles (190 km) south of Rio Grande. She was on a voyage from London to Montevideo, Uruguay.

== 11 April ==
List of shipwrecks: 11 April 1841
Ship	State	Description
Belle Alliance	Belgium	The ship was driven ashore by ice at Memel, Prussia. She was on a voyage from Memel to Antwerp. Belle Alliance was refloated and resumed her voyage.
Courtney	United Kingdom	The ship ran aground on the Horn Island Reef, in the Gulf of Mexico. She was on a voyage from the Clyde to Mobile, Alabama.
Emulous	United Kingdom	The ship was abandoned in the Atlantic Ocean. Her crew were rescued. She was on a voyage from London to Dorchester, New Brunswick, British North America.
Laurentine	France	The ship was driven ashore south of Bayonne, Basses-Pyrénées. Her crew were rescued. She was on a voyage from Newcastle upon Tyne, Northumberland, United Kingdom to Bayonne.

== 12 April ==
List of shipwrecks: 12 April 1841
Ship	State	Description
Friends	United Kingdom	The schooner was destroyed by fire at Sunderland, County Durham.

== 13 April ==
List of shipwrecks: 13 April 1841
Ship	State	Description
Armin	France	The ship was wrecked on the English Bank, off the coast of Argentina.
Mary Henney	United Kingdom	The ship was driven ashore at Lochdon, Isle of Mull, Outer Hebrides. She was on a voyage from Liverpool, Lancashire to Narva, Russia. She was refloated on 17 April and resumed her voyage.

== 15 April ==
List of shipwrecks: 15 April 1841
Ship	State	Description
Albion	United Kingdom	The ship was wrecked in the Atlantic Ocean. Five crew were rescued the next day by Suffolk(United Kingdom). Albion was on a voyage from Newcastle upon Tyne, Northumberland to Miramichi, New Brunswick, British North America.
Grasshopper	United Kingdom	The ship ran aground on a reef north west of Læsø, Denmark. She was on a voyage from Kallundborg, Denmark to Penzance, Cornwall. Grasshopper was refloated and resumed her voyage.
Sir William Heathcote	United Kingdom	The ship was wrecked at the Cape of Good Hope. She was on a voyage from the Breede River to Table Bay.
Sourabaya	Netherlands	The ship struck a coral reef off Tahiti and was consequently condemned.

== 16 April ==
List of shipwrecks: 16 April 1841
Ship	State	Description
Breeze	United Kingdom	The brig was driven ashore on St. Paul Island, Nova Scotia, British North America.
Eliza	United Kingdom	The ship was driven ashore at Memel, Prussia. She was on a voyage from Memel to London.

== 17 April ==
List of shipwrecks: 17 April 1841
Ship	State	Description
Earl of Durham	United Kingdom	The ship was driven ashore at Landskrona, Sweden. She was on a voyage from Liverpool, Lancashire to Riga, Russia. Earl of Durham was refloated and taken into Landskrona for repairs.
Eliza	United Kingdom	The ship was driven ashore at Memel, Prussia.
Elizabeth	Sweden	The ship was driven ashore between "Bellingen" and Riga, Russia. She was on a voyage from Gothenburg to a Belgian port. Elizabeth was later refloated and resumed her voyage.
Ferguson	United Kingdom	The transport ship was wrecked in the Torres Strait with the loss of one life. Survivors were rescued by Marquis of Hastings and Orient (both United Kingdom).
Majestic	United Kingdom	The ship was wrecked on the St Charles Shoals, off the coast of Cuba. Her crew were rescued. She was on a voyage from Mobile, Alabama to Quebec City, Province of Canada, British North America.
Woolsington	(United Kingdom of Great Britain and Ireland) Jamaica	The drogher sprang a leak and sank off Oracabessa Jamaica.

== 18 April ==
List of shipwrecks: 18 April 1841
Ship	State	Description
Charlotte	United Kingdom	The barque struck a sunken rock off the Cape Verde Islands (16°17′N 22°21′W) and foundered. All on board were rescued. She was on a voyage from London to Sydney, New South Wales.
Chronicle	United Kingdom	The collier was driven ashore and wrecked near Cherchell, Algeria. Her crew were rescued. She was on a voyage from Liverpool, Lancashire to Algiers.
Jeune Flavie	France	The ship collided with Ann and Jane (United Kingdom) and foundered in the North Sea off Flamborough Head, Yorkshire, United Kingdom with the loss of a crew member. She was on a voyage from Newcastle upon Tyne, Northumberland, United Kingdom to Dunkirk, Nord.

== 19 April ==
List of shipwrecks: 19 April 1841
Ship	State	Description
Alida	Rostock	The ship ran aground off Heligoland. She was on a voyage from Ghent, Belgium to Rostock. Alida was refloated and taken into Heligoland, but subsequently resumed her voyage.
William and Henry	United Kingdom	The ship capsized at South Shields, County Durham. She was righted the next day.
William Brown	United States	The ship collided with an iceberg 250 nautical miles (460 km) southeast of Cape Race, Newfoundland, British North America and foundered with the loss of 31 of the 81 people on board. Survivors were rescued by Crescent (United States). William Brown was on a voyage from Liverpool, Lancashire, United Kingdom to Philadelphia, Pennsylvania.

== 20 April ==
List of shipwrecks: 20 April 1841
Ship	State	Description
Betsey Stewart	United Kingdom	The ship was wrecked 14 nautical miles (26 km) south of Ventava, Courland Governorate. Her crew were rescued. She was on a voyage from Dundee, Forfarshire to Riga, Russia.
Highland Chief	United Kingdom	The brig caught fire in the Saint Lawrence River and was scuttled. She was on a voyage from Leith, Lothian to Montreal, Province of Canada, British North America. She was refloated on 27 April for repairs to be made.
Liberty	United Kingdom	The ship was driven ashore at Dunbar, Lothian.
Susan	United Kingdom	The ship ran aground and was subsequently driven ashore at Figueira da Foz, Portugal. She was refloated on 22 April and taken into Figueira da Foz in a severely damaged condition.

== 21 April ==
List of shipwrecks: 21 April 1841
Ship	State	Description
Amelia	United Kingdom	The ship ran aground at Memel, Prussia. She was on a voyage from Memel to London. Amelia was refloated on 27 April and resumed her voyage.
Barlow	United Kingdom	The ship ran aground and was damaged at Bermuda. She was on a voyage from Savannah, Georgia, United States to Halifax, Nova Scotia, British North America. Barlow was refloated and taken into Bermuda.
Jewess	(United Kingdom of Great Britain and Ireland) New Zealand	The schooner was driven ashore during a heavy gale and wrecked 12 miles (19 km) north of Porirua at "Pakakaria" (possibly Paekākāriki) with the loss of two of her crew. She was on a voyage from Wellington to Wanganui and Taranaki.
Narcissus	United Kingdom	The ship capsized at Hayle, Cornwall and was severely damaged. She was on a voyage from Sunderland, County Durham to Hayle. Narcissus was righted and taken into Penzance.
Sylvia	United Kingdom	The ship ran aground on the Beaumont Shoal, off the coast of British North America.

== 23 April ==
List of shipwrecks: 23 April 1841
Ship	State	Description
Ba Fe	Brazil	The smack ran aground and was wrecked at Maranhão. Her crew were rescued. She was on a voyage from Pernambuco to Maranhão.

== 24 April ==
List of shipwrecks: 24 April 1841
Ship	State	Description
Ann	United Kingdom	The ship was driven ashore at Drogheda, County Louth. She was on a voyage from Whitehaven, Cumberland to Drogheda. Ann was refloated on 4 May and taken into Drogheda.
Elizabeth Ann	United Kingdom	The ship was driven ashore at Plymouth, Devon.
Elizabeth Ann	United Kingdom	The ship was driven ashore at Stornoway, Isle of Lewis, Outer Hebrides. She was on a voyage from Liverpool, Lancashire to Fisherrow, Aberdeenshire.
Enigheden	Norway	The ship was wrecked on South Uist, Outer Hebrides. Her crew were rescued. She was on a voyage from Dram to Wicklow, United Kingdom.
Queen	United Kingdom	The barque was driven ashore at Lochmaddy, North Uist, Outer Hebrides. Her crew survived. She was on a voyage from South Shields, County Durham to Londonderry.
Recovery	United Kingdom	The barque was wrecked on a sandbank off Lissadill, County Sligo. All on board, over 200 people, were rescued.
Stradacona	United Kingdom	The ship was sunk by an iceberg off Cape Ray, Newfoundland, British North America. Her crew were rescued. She was on a voyage from Liverpool to Montreal, Province of Canada, British North America.
Susan	United Kingdom	The ship was driven ashore and damaged at Westport, County Mayo. She was on a voyage from Westport to London. Susan was refloated and taken into Westport for repairs.

== 25 April ==
List of shipwrecks: 25 April 1841
Ship	State	Description
Caledonia	United Kingdom	The ship was wrecked off the coast of Glamorgan.
Salacia	United Kingdom	The ship ran aground and was damaged at South Shields, County Durham. She was on a voyage from Great Yarmouth, Norfolk to South Shields. She was refloated.

== 26 April ==
List of shipwrecks: 26 April 1841
Ship	State	Description
Ocean	United Kingdom	The ship ran aground off Helsingør, Denmark. She was on a voyage from Anklam, Prussia to Whitby, Yorkshire. Ocean was refloated and resumed her voyage.
Venus	United Kingdom	The ship ran aground on the Foreness Rock, Margate, Kent. She was on a voyage from Saundersfoot, Pembrokeshire to Grays, Essex.

== 29 April ==
List of shipwrecks: 29 April 1841
Ship	State	Description
Anna Birgitta Maria	Sweden	The ship ran aground off "Ellsborg". She was on a voyage from Gothenburg to Calais, France. She was later refloated.
Margaret	United Kingdom	The ship was wrecked on the Rossnas, in the Kattegat. Her crew were rescued. She was on a voyage from London to Kalundborg, Denmark.
Meteor	United Kingdom	The ship was driven ashore on Partridge Island, British North America. She was on a voyage from Saint John, New Brunswick, British North America to Hull, Yorkshire.

== 30 April ==
List of shipwrecks: 30 April 1841
Ship	State	Description
Affleck	United Kingdom	The ship was wrecked in the Dry Tortugas. Her crew were rescued. She was on a voyage from Savanilla, near Puerto Colombia, to Liverpool, Lancashire.

== Unknown date ==
List of shipwrecks: Unknown date in April 1841
Ship	State	Description
Albion	United Kingdom	The ship was wrecked on the Red Island Reef before 20 April. She was on a voyage from Bristol, Gloucestershire to Quebec City, Province of Canada, British North America.
Alpha	United States	The ship was abandoned in the Atlantic Ocean with the loss of two of her crew. Survivors were rescued by Moslem (flag unknown). Alpha was on a voyage from New York to Porto, Portugal.
Arietta	United Kingdom	The ship foundered in the Atlantic Ocean. Her crew were rescued. She was on a voyage from St. Jago de Cuba, Cuba to Swansea, Glamorgan via New York.
Comet	United Kingdom	The ship was driven ashore in Tobermory Bay. She was on a voyage from Liverpool, Lancashire to Wyborg, Grand Duchy of Finland. She was refloated on 29 April and beached at Tobermory, Isle of Mull.
Elizabeth	(United Kingdom of Great Britain and Ireland) Van Diemen's Land	The schooner was driven ashore in Encounter Bay. She was later refloated and taken into Port Adelaide, South Australia.
Eole	France	The ship was wrecked on the Banco Ortiz before 11 April. She was on a voyage from Buenos Aires, Argentina to Havre de Grâce, Seine-Inférieure.
Herald and Nicholais	Norway	The ship was abandoned in the Atlantic Ocean off Cape Finisterre, Spain on or before 29 April. She was subsequently towed into Portsmouth, Hampshire, United Kingdom by Scheepsboulust (Netherlands). She arrived on 8 May.
Jeune Adelaide	France	The ship was wrecked on the coast of Spain. She was on a voyage from Santander, Spain to Havana, Cuba.
Leander	United States	The ship ran aground on the Carysfort Reef. She was on a voyage from New Orleans, Louisiana to Trieste. Leander was refloated and taken into Key West, Florida Territory, where she was condemned.
Mary	United Kingdom	The ship was driven ashore at Wicklow. She was on a voyage from Stornoway, Isle of Lewis, Outer Hebrides to Wicklow. Mary was refloated on 26 April.
Traveller	(United Kingdom of Great Britain and Ireland) New South Wales	The coaster was wrecked off Reid's Mistake. She was on a voyage from Brisbane to Newcastle.
Union	United Kingdom	The ship was driven ashore at Rye, Sussex. She was on a voyage from London to Mauritius. She was refloated on 20 April and taken into Rye.
