= Seaflower =

Seaflower or sea flower may refer to:

- Seaflower (ship), a sailing ship used in the 1600s
- HMS Seaflower, many ships from the 1700s to 1800s
- The Sea Flower, a 1918 silent film

== See also ==
- Ocean Flower Island
