= David Bartholomew =

David or Dave Bartholomew may refer to:

- Dave Bartholomew (1918–2019), American musician
- D. J. Bartholomew (1931–2017), British statistician
- David Ewen Bartholomew (c. 1767/1768–1821), British naval officer
