= Hired armed cutter King George =

The Royal Navy used several vessels that were described as His Majesty's hired armed cutter King George. Some of these may have been the same vessel on repeat contract.

== First hired armed cutter King George ==
The first King George was a cutter of 12815/94 tons (bm), carrying twelve 4-pounder guns. She served from 24 June 1796 to 1799. In 1797 she was under the command of under Lieutenant James Rains. May saw her participating in the capture of the French privateer Adolphe, together with Nautilus and Seagull. King George had led the chase with Nautilus and Seagull joining in for another four hours before Nautilus succeeded in capturing Adolpe. Adolphe was pierced for 12 guns but had thrown some overboard during the chase. When the British captured her, Adolphe had five guns, eight swivels, and a crew of 35. She was new, nine days out of Boulogne on her first cruise and had not taken any prizes.

On 2 July Nautilus, Seagull, King George and the hired armed cutter Fox captured the Dutch privateer Klyne Sperwer, of 28 men, 20 of whom escaped in boats. Klyne Sperwer was armed with six 3-pounder guns, swivel guns, muskets, and the like. She had a crew of 28 men, 20 of whom escaped in boats. She had been out a month from Amsterdam but had taken nothing.

Three weeks later, on 23 July, after a three-hour chase, King George and Seagull captured the French privateer Captain Thurot near Christiansand. Captaine Thurot was a small French privateer cutter armed with two brass 6-pounders and four swivels, and had a crew of 22. She had already captured the ship Tom, of Liverpool, from Riga, with timber, and the brig Bachelor, of Saltcoats in Scotland. Nautilus shared with Seagull by a private agreement.

On 9 October King George sailed from Yarmouth for the Texel and on 11 October participated in the Battle of Camperdown. On 12 February 1798 prize money resulting from the sale of Dutch ships captured on 11 October 1797 was due for payment. In 1847 the surviving members of the crews of all the British vessels at the battle qualified for the Naval General Service Medal with the clasp "Camperdown".

== Second hired armed cutter King George ==
The second King George may well have been the same vessel. She was of 133 61/94 tons (bm), and mounted twelve 12-pounder carronades. She served from 22 November 1799 until 23 October 1801. On 16 February 1800 King George recaptured the brig Perth.

On 28 January 1801, while under the command of Lieutenant William Isaac Pearce, she captured the French privateer Flibustier in the Downs station. Flibustier was two days out of Dunkirk, had made no captures, and carried a crew of 16, armed with muskets and pistols. Prize money resulting from the capture of Flibustier was due to be paid on 18 April 1803.

Earlier that month, King George had detained the Vrow Jesina, Diericke, master, which had been sailing from Hambro to Liverpool. Vrow Jesina was lost off Dover, but part of her cargo was saved.

In late 1801 King George, under the command of a Mr. Yawkins (William Yawkins), served under Nelson at Nelson's failed attack on Boulogne. (Note: In 1797 Yawkins had served with Nelson, who knew him personally, at Cadiz.) On 25 August Nelson came aboard King George to conduct a reconnaissance of the French fleet. In October Nelson gave Lieutenant William Fitzwilliam Owen of the fire ship Nancy command over the King George as well, with secret instructions to launch a burning Nancy at the French fleet. The fire attack did not occur and Nancy was sold in December.

== Third hired armed cutter King George ==
The third King George was a smaller vessel than her predecessor(s). She was a former packet boat of 58 47/94 tons (bm), and carried six 4-pounder guns. She served from 30 May 1803 to 15 December 1804, and again from 17 September 1807 until 18 May 1814.

=== First contract ===
In 1803 she was under the command of a Lieutenant Brown. On 25 May King George was part of a squadron of six vessels that captured the Matilda.

In July and August 1804 King George participated in the squadron under Captain Robert Dudley Oliver in HMS Melpomene at the bombardment of French vessels at Le Havre. The bomb vessels' shells and carcasses set the town on fire on 23 July. On 1 August, the vessels kept a continuous fire for three hours. Still, it is not clear that the bombardment did much damage to the French flotilla. On 31 July the squadron did capture the French vessel Papillon.

King George also shared in the capture, on 15 September, of the Flora de Lisboa, off Havre.

=== Second contract ===
On 17 August 1807 King George was among the vessels sharing in the capture of the Hans and Jacob. Then four days later King George was among the vessels that captured the Twee Gebroders. (Note: An able seaman's share of the prize money for the first was 2s 6d, and for the second 9½d.)

In her second contract, King George, under the command of Master's Mate Thomas Mercer, participated in the Battle of the Basque Roads. William Congreve, who had arrived with a transport, fitted King George, Whiting and the other hired armed cutter, Nimrod, with rockets. On 11 April the three vessels took up a position near the Boyart (see Fort Boyard) Shoal while fireships made a night attack on the French ships. The next day all three, together with a number of other vessels, opened fire upon Océan, Régulus, and the frigate Indienne, as those ships lay aground. The first two eventually escaped, and the last was one of four eventually destroyed, though by her own crew some days later to avoid capture. (Note: Head money was paid in March 1819. An ordinary seaman received 13 shillings; a first-class share was worth £86 13s 2¼d.) In 1847 the surviving members of the crews of all the British vessels at the battle qualified for the Naval General Service Medal with the clasp "Basque Roads 1809". Rear-Admiral Robert Stopford sent King George back to England with dispatches.

On 24 November 1809 King George captured a Danish galiot whose name later was established as the Texel. Then on 14 January 1810 she recaptured the Drie Gebroeders, J.F. Learman, Master.

On 10 March 1811, while under command of Thomas Mercer, Master, she was in company with Desiree when they captured the French privateer cutter Velocifere. Velocifere was armed with 14 guns and had a crew of 57 men.

On 10 March 1812 King George and Mr. Thomas Mercer were in company with Prospero, Aquilon and Raven when they captured the American brig John. Then on 27 June King George captured the Jonge Antonio.

On 17 September 1812, King George captured the merchant vessel Friede, and was present when Desiree captured the merchant vessel Dasikbaarheit. On 19 September Hearty was in company with Desiree and King George when they captured the Friede. Two days later Hearty and King George captured the Frau Maria.

On 12 May 1813 King George captured off Lowestoff the small French privateer Elise (or Eliza). The Eliza had a crew of 15 men, armed with small arms. She had been out three days without capturing anything, and came into Yarmouth the next day.

On 18 October 1813, King George captured the Director and the Elizabeth. Then on 15 December King George captured the Alexandria.

== Fourth hired armed cutter King George ==
The fourth King George may have been the same vessel as one or the other, or both, of the first two. She was of 129 27/94 tons burthen and carried twelve 12-pounder carronades. She served from 22 August 1803 until 25 September 1804 when she grounded and her crew set her on fire to prevent her capture.

In 1804 King George had officially been renamed Georgiana (though the continuing reference to her under her old name suggests that this had not taken universally), and was under the command of Lieutenant Joshua Kneeshaw. Earlier, on 25 May 1804 she was in company with a number of British vessels at the capture of the Matilda. Then on 31 July King George was in company with a much larger flotilla at the capture of the Postilion.

On 7 August the flotilla, including King George, entered the mouth of the Seine to bombard a French flotilla of gun-brigs and luggers. On 15 September, a number of ships and vessels, including King George, participated in the capture by Poulette of the Flora de Lisboa, taken off Le Havre.

On 25 September Georgiana had harried a sloop in a small convoy that had left Le Havre and was making for Honfleur, forcing the sloop to run aground, just before she herself ran aground on the western end of the Ratier bank. When efforts to lighten her failed to free her, and several French gunboats and luggers approached, her crew set her on fire. The crew escaped in boats, pursued by French boats firing on them until the gun-brig Locust drove the French off. Georgiana blew up around 6pm. The court martial on 17 November praised Kneeshaw and his crew for their conduct and acquitted them of the loss. Kneeshaw was a veteran officer who had lost an arm in service; he received a pension of £200 per annum.

== Hired armed cutter King George the Second ==
On 6 October 1803, the hired armed cutter King George the Second was under the command of Lieutenant Francis Gybbon when she recaptured British Tar. Lloyd's List initially reported that HMS Beaver had recaptured British Tar. The newspaper also reported that British Tar had been sailing from the Baltic to Leith when a privateer had taken her in the North Sea. British Tar arrived in "the river" after her recapture.

== Other vessels named King George in government service ==
On 27 April 1804 the French privateer Hirondelle, of fourteen 12-pounders and 80 crew, captured the Government of Malta brig or cutter King George off Cape Passero. Bittern captured Hirondelle and recaptured two brigs that she had taken, Mentor, of London, and Catherine, of Liverpool. They had been sailing with valuable cargoes from Messina to Malta to join a convoy. Bittern's launch rowed 15 leagues to try to recapture King George but were too late.

On 28 September 1804 the Navy armed 16 hoys at Margate for the defence of the coast. One of these bore the name King George. The Navy manned each vessel with a commander from the Navy and nine men from the Sea Fencibles.

== See also ==
- Hired armed cutter George
- HMS King George V
- HMS King George VI
