= Treaty of Nicolls' Outpost =

Treaty between Great Britain and refugee Native Americans

The Treaty of Nicolls' Outpost is an obscure, unratified treaty between Great Britain and the Red Stick Creek and other refugee Native Americans. Under it, Britain was to recognize the Native Americans as subjects of the Crown and defend them and their territory from the United States.

The treaty was the product of a March 10, 1815 meeting at Nicolls' Outpost, a small fortification built by Colonel Edward Nicolls just south of the U.S. (Georgia) border (in modern Chattahoochee, Florida). Attending, besides Nicolls, were four other British officers, Capt. George Woodbine, Capt. Joseph Ross, Henry Ross, and William Hambly, about to depart after the conclusion of the War of 1812 in early 1815. Representing the Native Americans were Neamathla, Francis the Prophet, Peter McQueen, Thomas Perryman, his son William Perryman, and more than thirty others, the whole of what was about to become a new ethnicity, the Seminoles.

In the Treaty the Native Americans promised allegiance to Great Britain, which in turn accepted them as subjects of the British empire. (This is why the Union Jack was raised over the Negro Fort.) The hope was that Britain would provide them with protection against the United States and help them recover their land taken since 1811, which the Treaty of Ghent, ending the War of 1812, said they were to receive. Specifically they meant the huge territory lost under the Treaty of Fort Jackson, which the Red Sticks had not signed and claimed did not apply to them. Nicolls, a champion of Native American rights, created this treaty on his own initiative, without authorization.

The outcome was the famous trip of Francis and his son Earle, escorted and hosted by Nicolls, to London. Francis, as well as the informal leader of the Red Sticks, was the most articulate Native American at the meeting. He was the representative of the Native Americans, hoping Britain would sign the treaty.

Great Britain, having just ended the unpopular War of 1812, was not interested in further armed conflict with the United States. The Regent refused to see Francis, sent him home (not without his meeting a number of prominent Englishmen), and chastised Nicolls.

The draft treaty is among the papers passed on from the War Office to The National Archives (United Kingdom). Note that it is not called the Treaty of Nicolls' Outpost (or anything else). The name "Nicolls' Outpost" for the fortification was not used until the 1950s, when this term was coined by Mark F Boyd.

== Bibliography ==
- Cox, Dale (2016). Fort Scott, Fort Hughes & Camp Recovery. Three 19th century military sites in Southwest Georgia. Old Kitchen Books. ISBN 9780692704011.
- Cox, Dale; Conrad, Rachael (2017). Fowltown: Neamathla, Tutalosi Talofa and the first battle of the Seminole Wars. Old Kitchen Books. p. 65. ISBN 978-0692977880.
- Cox, Dale (November 15, 2022). Nicolls' outpost : a War of 1812 fort at Chattahoochee, Florida (Hardcover ed.). Old Kitchen Books. ISBN 979-8362183813.
- Millett, Nathaniel (2013). The Maroons of Prospect Bluff and Their Quest for Freedom in the Atlantic World. University Press of Florida. ISBN 9780813044545 – via Project MUSE.
