= Thomas Perryman =

Thomas Perryman (native name Kinache) (? –1815 or 1816) was a Creek Indian leader, eventually the ”patriarch" of the lower Creek (see Creek War). He was from the town of Tocktoethla, on the east side of the Chattahoochee River in what is today Seminole County, Georgia. His father was Theophilus Perryman, an English trader, and his mother was a Creek woman from the town of Eufaula, also on the Chattahoochee. As was customary among the matrilineal Creeks, he was accepted as a member of the tribe.

Perryman fought on the side of the British during the American Revolutionary War. He was part of the forces of Colonel Thomas Brown, who had married one of his daughters. Perryman also had the title of Colonel. Thomas's son William Perryman was designed a captain in the same conflict.

Another of Perryman's daughters married the pirate and adventurer William Augustus Bowles, founder of the short-lived State of Muskogee in Spanish north Florida. He was an ally of Bowles for many years and helped supply Bowles' pirate ships.

He and his friend and ally the Miccosukee chief Cappachimico were the chiefs the British contacted when they anchored off the shore of Apalachicola, Florida in 1814, looking for Native American allies. The two, whom the British called the Kings of the Creek and Miccosukkee respectively, at the same time calling them "majestic beasts", gave the British permission to unload on St. Vincent Island their supplies for an invasion of the United States via Georgia (see Prospect Bluff Historic Sites). Perryman also accompanied Lt. Col. Edward Nicolls by ship to New Orleans, presumably to give Perryman an impressive view of British military might in the Battle of New Orleans.

Perryman was present at the signing of the Treaty of Nicolls' Outpost.

Perryman died in 1815 or 1816 and is buried in an unmarked grave somewhere in or near Fairchild Park in Seminole County, Georgia.
