= Fort Hughes (Georgia) =

Coordinates: 30°54′29″N 84°34′45″W

In 1817, during the First Seminole War, Fort Hughes was built on the south side of the Flint River in what is today Bainbridge, Georgia. It was on a bluff at the west end of today's J. D. Chason Memorial Park. Sovereignty over the land between the Flint River and today's border with Florida was an issue; the battle of nearby Fowltown, November 21–23, 1817, had been over this question. According to the U.S. Government, these lands had been ceded by the Lower Creek Indians in the Treaty of Fort Jackson, whereas the Upper Creeks, also known as Red Stick Creeks or Mikasuki, had not been party to the treaty, did not feel bound by it, and said the land did not belong to the Lower Creeks in the first place. The fort was intended to prevent further conflict in this region.

The Fort consisted of a stockade 90 feet (27 m) square, with two blockhouses at opposite corners, each 20 feet (6.1 m) square. It was named for the only American killed at the Battle of Fowltown, the young fifer Aaron Hughes, whose grave, while unlocated, is believed to be somewhere at the site. The fort site was chosen by Lt. Col. Arbuckle, who supervised its building, which, using 300 men, took three days. 40 men were left stationed at Fort Hughes after its construction was finished about November 27. A group of at least 32 Red Stick Creeks was led against it by Peter Cook, clerk at Arbuthnot's store, and former Colonial Marines lieutenant Robert Ambrister, and attacked it unsuccessfully sometime between December 7 and 15. The fort resisted the attack successfully. However, after the Scott Massacre of November 30, and the impossibility of resupplying the fort given the siege that began at the Battle of Ocheesee on December 15, Arbuckle ordered Fort Hughes evacuated and abandoned on December 18, 1817. It was never reoccupied.
