= David Ewen Bartholomew =

Royal Navy captain (1767-1821)

Captain David Ewen Bartholomew CB
- Born: c. 1767/1768; Linlithgowshire, Scotland
- Died: 19 February 1821 (aged 53–54); Porto Praya, Cape Verde Islands
- Military career
- Allegiance: United Kingdom
- Branch: Royal Navy
- Service years: 1795–1821
- Rank: Royal Navy Captain
- Conflicts: French Revolutionary Wars; Napoleonic Wars
- Awards: Companion of the Order of the Bath
- Other work: Renowned cartographer

Captain David Ewen Bartholomew, CB (c. 1767/1768 - 19 February 1821) was an officer of the British Royal Navy and Merchant Navy, who rose from a poor background to become a post captain and prominent surveyor and cartographer, who was the first British man to map numerous sections of the South American, Arabian and African coastlines. During his career, Bartholomew was twice seized by press gangs and forced to serve as a sailor in the Navy, the second occasion at the orders of Lord St Vincent following an argument. This incident provoked outrage at St Vincent's abuse of his authority and resulted in Bartholomew's promotion and employment as a surveyor. He was so successful that in 1818 he was given command of the frigate HMS Leven on which he was ordered to survey the African coast. Many of his fellow officers later became prominent geographers of the early nineteenth century, although Bartholomew died while still on the service, after falling ill with tuberculosis.

== Early life ==
Born into a poor family in Linlithgowshire in Scotland, Bartholomew joined the Merchant Navy at a young age and became a highly experienced sailor, travelling to the Baltic Sea and the West Indies, working on hired merchant ships during campaigns against French islands there at the outbreak of the French Revolutionary Wars. He later served on Greenland whalers, but in 1795 was seized by a press gang at Wapping and forcibly recruited into the Royal Navy. Due to a superior education (although where he obtained this education is unknown), Bartholomew was rapidly promoted to midshipman, serving in numerous theatres and becoming a favourite of Admiral Sir Home Riggs Popham. Bartholomew was present at the surrender of the Dutch fleet in 1799, on HMS Romney in the East Indies and in 1802 was in charge of the ship's chronometers during a voyage to the Red Sea. The Peace of Amiens in the same year saw a reduction in the Navy and Bartholomew was placed in reserve.

== Advancement ==
Frustrated at his lack of employment, Bartholomew wrote eight letters to the First Lord of the Admiralty Lord St Vincent, and often visited the Admiralty in the hope of securing an appointment aboard a ship. Infuriated at Bartholomew's insistence, St Vincent, a bitter personal and professional rival of Popham ordered Bartholomew seized and press ganged for a second time. Placed aboard HMS Inflexible as an able seaman, Bartholomew was rapidly restored to his previous rank of midshipman and subsequently to acting lieutenant. A storm of public protest was directed at St Vincent, who had overstepped his authority and the custom of the day by ordering the impressment of a serving warrant officer after a personal disagreement. When St Vincent was forced from office in April 1804, Bartholomew re-joined Popham on HMS Antelope during operations against Boulogne-sur-Mer. The same year his case was heard in Parliament, where St Vincent's actions were roundly condemned as being detrimental to the practices and morale of the Navy.

In 1805, probably due to his notoriety in the aftermath of the impressment scandal, Bartholomew was formally promoted to lieutenant and served aboard HMS Diadem during the capture of the Cape of Good Hope in 1806. Later in the year, during Popham's disastrous expedition against Buenos Aires, Bartholomew was detached to conduct the first British surveys of the River Plate.

On 10 January 1808, Batholomew was appointed to HMS Sapphire.

The Royal Navy hired Berwick Packet on 26 June 1809 and put Lieutenant Bartholomew in command. She was one of 15 small transports that the Navy hired for the ill-fated Walcheren Campaign. Her first assignment was to carry Congreve rockets from the Woolwich Arsenal to Walcheren. She participated in the capture of Vlissingen and was generally useful for the remainder of the campaign. The Navy returned Berwick Packet to her owners on 28 October.

On 4 July 1810, Bartholomew returned to Sapphire, but was among the officers transferred to command gunboats off Cádiz in support of allied forces in the Peninsula War.

In May 1811 he took command of the brig HMS Richmond. On Richmond, Bartholomew attacked and defeated a French privateer Intrépide in February 1812 and was subsequently promoted to commander. In 1814, Bartholomew was in command of the rocket ship HMS Erebus off the United States during the War of 1812. In Erebus, Bartholomew was part of James Alexander Gordon's successful campaign to attack Alexandria, Virginia by sailing up the Potomac River. He then operated off Georgia and participated in the attack on the St. Marys River. For his services in America, Bartholomew was promoted to post captain and made a Companion of the Order of the Bath.

== Geographical services ==
At the end of the Napoleonic Wars, Bartholomew's abilities as a surveyor and cartographer were required and he was given command of the small frigate HMS Leven off the West coast of Africa, charged with preparing detailed and accurate charts of the region. Leven's officers were all young geographers, many of whom would later achieve prominence in the field, including Alexander Vidal, William Mudge, Alexander Becher and George Frazer. Bartholomew had successfully surveyed the Azores, stretches of West Africa and was working on the Cape Verde Islands when he fell ill with tuberculosis in 1821 and died at Porto Praya on Santiago. The expedition to West Africa was taken over by William Fitzwilliam Owen, but by its completion in 1825, over half the crew had died from tropical illnesses, including Bartholomew and his teenage son George, who died on Leven in 1819. He has been described as "One of the unsung heroes of the surveying service" and is also considered exceptional for his rise from an impressed sailor to post captain at a time when this was almost impossible to achieve.
