= HMS Leven (1813) =

Post Ship of the Royal Navy

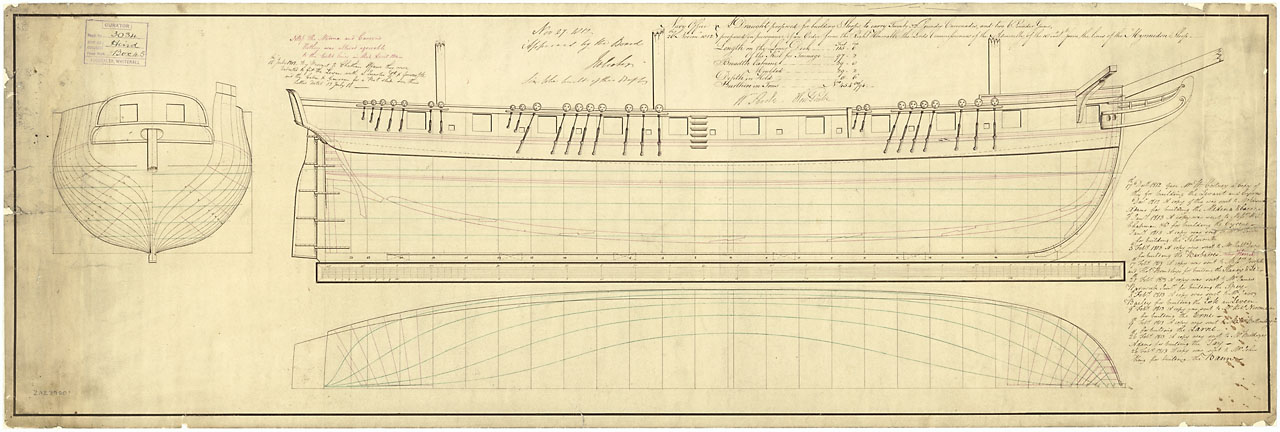
- Leven

History

United Kingdom
- Name: HMS Leven
- Ordered: 18 November 1812
- Builder: Jabez Bayley, Ipswich
- Laid down: March 1813
- Launched: 23 December 1813
- Completed: By 5 March 1814 for ordinary
- Reclassified: Hospital ship 1827, prison hulk 1830, receiving ship 1842
- Fate: Broken-up, July 1848

General characteristics
- Class & type: Cyrus-class post ship
- Tons burthen: 45677/94 (bm)
- Length: Gun deck:115 ft 8 in (35.3 m); Keel:97 ft 4 1/2 in (29.7 m)
- Beam: 29 ft 8 3/8 in (9.1 m)
- Depth of hold: 8 ft 6 3/4 in (2.6 m)
- Sail plan: Full-rigged ship
- Complement: 135
- Armament: 20 × 32-pounder carronades + 2 × 6-pounder chase guns

HMS Leven, was a 20-gun sixth-rate post ship (sometimes referred to as a sloop) of the Cyrus class, for the Royal Navy. She was built in Ipswich, and launched on 23 December 1813. She was notable as the survey ship that mapped large stretches of the coast of Africa in a voyage from 1821 to 1826, under the command of Captain William Fitzwilliam Owen. Leven Point near Cape Vidal in KwaZulu-Natal, South Africa, is named after the ship.

== Napoleonic wars ==
After commissioning at Woolwich in October 1814, Leven was employed on the coast of La Vendee during Napoleon Bonaparte's final campaign, under the command of Captain Buckland Stirling Bluett.

== Survey service ==
She was decommissioned at Chatham in 1816, and, in August 1818, she was transferred to the Royal Navy's Survey Service under the command of Captain David Ewen Bartholomew, who set off to survey part of the west African coast and the Cape Verde Islands. Bartholomew died at Porto Praya in Santiago on 19 February 1821; his first lieutenant, Robert Baldey, returned Leven to Spithead on 23 July, after an abortive attempt to map the River Gambia.

Survey of the Cape of Good Hope by Lieut ATE Vidal of HMS Leven assisted by and under the direction of Captn WFW Owen

Command of the ship passed to Captain William Fitzwilliam Owen, who had risen to prominence following his surveys of the Great Lakes. In August 1821, in the company of the brig-sloop Barracouta, Leven departed for Africa again, with orders to map eastward from the Cape of Good Hope. Amending orders later extended the mission to include a survey of the entire east coast of Africa as well as southern Arabia, Madagascar, and several island groups in the Indian Ocean. On their return journey, long stretches of the west African coastline and the River Gambia were surveyed, several slave ships were apprehended and support was given to British forces in the First Anglo-Ashanti War. By the time Leven returned home late in 1826, she had surveyed 30,000 nautical miles (56,000 km) of coast and prepared 83 charts. This had been achieved at a terrible cost; half the crew of the two little ships had been killed by tropical diseases.

Lloyd's List (LL) for 20 June 1823 reported a letter from the Cape dated 2 April. The brig Singapore, of Bengal, had arrived the day before. Leven had found her near Delagoa Bay in the hands of the Portuguese government. Only one of her crew was still alive; the master and all the rest had died of disease. The government had landed her cargo. Captain Owen prevailed on the government to reload the cargo. He then put a crew on board Singapore and sent her into the Cape. There was another vessel at Delagoa Bay, the schooner Orange Grove, which too had lost all but her master and supercargo, and whose cargo too the government had landed. Orange Grove sailed to the Cape in company with Singapore.

== Harbour duties ==
Leven was decommissioned in February 1827, and was fitted out as a hospital ship. By 1830, she was a prison hulk at Chatham and, in 1842, was the receiving ship at Limehouse. She was finally broken-up in July 1848.
