= Neamathla =

Native American leader

- Nehē Emarv
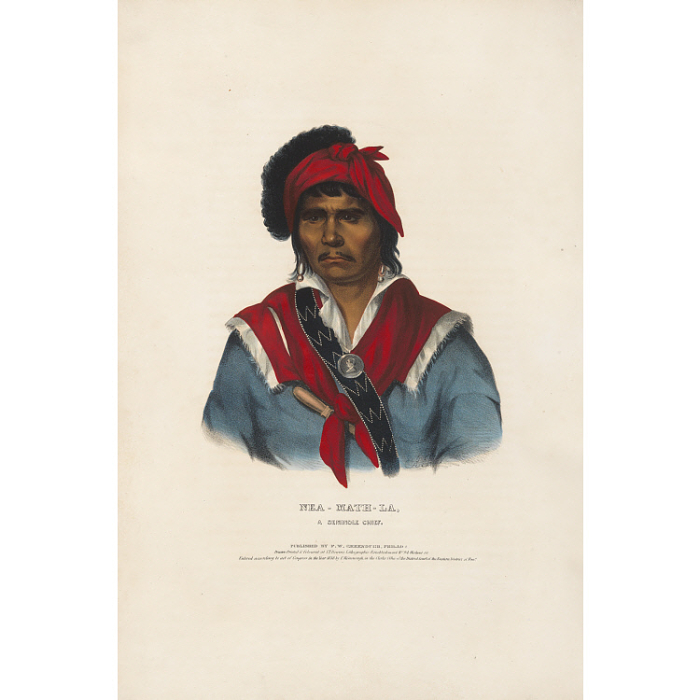
- Copy of burned original by Charles Bird King (Smithsonian Institution)

Mikasuki (Muscogee/Creek) leader
- Incumbent
- Assumed office 1813

Leader of Red Stick Creeks

Personal details
- Born: 1750s
- Died: 1841 (about 90) Indian Territory (modern Oklahoma)
- Mother tongue: Hitchiti

Military service
- Battles/wars: Battle of Uchee Creek

Neamathla (Creek: Nehē Emarv; 1750s–1841) was a leader of the Red Stick Creek. His name, in the Hitchiti (or Mikasuki) language, means "fat next to warrior", "fat" being a reference to great courage. The Hitchiti language had no written form, but modern scholars agree that Eneah Emathla is the "proper" spelling of his name in English; however, there were two other men also named Eneah Emathla, so the modern convention is to use the spelling Neamathla for the leader.

He probably spent his childhood in or near Fowltown (Tutalosi Talofa), on the east bank of the lower Flint River (Georgia), where the Hitchiti were concentrated. They had supported the British during the American Revolution, although participation by Neamathla is not documented. When the British returned in the War of 1812, he was "among the first chiefs to answer their call".

== Leadership of the Red Stick Creeks ==
The Creek (Muscogee) Indians were dividing into two factions at the beginning of the 19th century, a result of contact with westward-expanding European-Americans. They are commonly referred to as the "upper" and "lower" Creeks, names whose geographical meaning was soon lost as the Creeks were of necessity mobile. The larger group were the "upper" Creeks, also called Red Sticks, from the color of a symbolic wooden club that indicated readiness for war. "Lower" Creeks were relatively accommodating of the whites, especially Indian agent Benjamin Hawkins, and began to adapt the sedentary, farming lifestyle that he recommended. (To their surprise, after passage of the Indian Removal Act of 1830, they too were required to abandon their farms and walk to their new territory in Oklahoma.)

The Red Stick leader Francis the Prophet visited, seeking allies in his plan to resist white civilization, to avoid further land cessions to the whites, and to recover the immense tracts of land lost in the Treaty of New York (1790), the Forbes purchase (1,200,000 acres (1,900 sq mi; 490,000 ha)), and, later, the Treaty of Fort Jackson (23,000,000 acres (36,000 sq mi; 9,300,000 ha)). The Hitchiti were enthusiastic about the plan, begun by Tecumseh and joined by Neamathla, to create a pan-Indian confederation to prevent the whites from settling west of the Appalachian Mountains.

Neamathla and the Fowltown warriors, all Red Sticks, were defeated in the Battle of Uchee Creek (1813) by the "southern" Creeks. (See Creek War.) They might have won had they not run out of ammunition. When a supply party with ammunition was attacked on its return from Pensacola — a preemptive strike — by U.S. forces, the Red Sticks defeated them at the Battle of Burnt Corn. In response came an attack on Fort Mims (1813), led by William Weatherford and Peter McQueen (Neamathla was not present), in which the Red Sticks killed over 250 men, women, and children. This was followed two days later by the smaller Kimbell-James Massacre, led by Francis the Prophet. Now the war between the two Creek factions had turned into a war with the U.S. government. The Red Stick Creeks were decisively defeated in the Battle of Horseshoe Bend (1814).

Although the battle was more than 50 miles (80 km) from Fowltown, Neamathla led a mass evacuation from the Flint River of the Red Stick Creeks that had taken part. They concentrated again near the confluence of the Chattahoochee and Flint Rivers. Fowltown was reestablished, briefly, on the west bank of the Chattahoochee, in modern Jackson County, Florida (the second Fowltown).

The Red Stick Creeks took refuge in Spanish Florida. They were described as "absolute skin and bone", having lost everything they ever owned. The number is estimated at 1,500–3,000. "All were desperate for food and supplies," "starving", but the Spaniards in Florida did not have the food to feed such a large number. Across the U.S. border, white settlers believed that they would be forced to surrender, and Andrew Jackson made it known that Francis the Prophet and Peter McQueen would be hung.

== Arrival of the British ==
The situation changed when two British warships carrying muskets and other supplies landed near modern Apalachicola, Florida in May, 1814, and sent an officer as recruiter, inviting the Native Americans to take up arms. Neamathla was among the first who responded. The officer also identified Prospect Bluff as a good location for the logistical base for a planned invasion of the United States via the confluence of the Flint and Chattahoochee Rivers. The British were at Prospect Bluff within two weeks, and also announced construction of "an encampment" (Nicolls' Outpost) where the rivers met. The British also found it a problem to feed the refugees, even more so because soldiers of the 3rd Battalion, Royal and Colonial Marines) were expected, along with "the Pensacola party" of British soldiers. The British trained the Indians. Neamathla and the other Fowltown warriors soon started harassing whites living near Milledgeville, Georgia and Fort Hawkins. No British-affiliated force ever reached this far into U.S. territory during the Gulf campaign of the War of 1812.

A series of raids on southern Georgia settlements continued, which the Georgia militia, which had been called out, blamed on the Red Stick Creeks from Fowltown. They continued to harass "the frontier", and helped slaves escape. By December Nicolls and Woodbine were recruiting black soldiers for a new battalion of Colonial Marines. On December 5, a printing press on the British flagship issued a call for members of "the Indian nation" to join in their war against the United States, by which the Indians would recover "the lands of your forefathers", assured that "our good Father will on no account forget the welfare of his much-lov'd Indian children". Meanwhile, the Americans were building boats on the Chattahoochee and gathering additional troops with which to destroy the British forts on the Apalachicola as well as the Red Stick villages.

== Confrontation with Col. Clinch at Fort Scott, 1816–1818 ==
The Red Sticks, newly supplied with arms and ammunition from the abandoned Negro Fort, felt that "widespread combat" was about to break out. When Neamathla left to bring back more arms and ammunition from Negro Fort, Clinch started building Camp Crawford, later called Fort Scott. He then compelled Neamathla to make a humiliating appearance before him. Other Indian chiefs were present and said "they never saw him so completely cut down before". He consented to every demand Clinch made of him. Then followed the explosion of Negro Fort. Finding their location (between two U.S. forts, Scott and Jackson) indefensible, Neamathla led his people to a third location for Fowltown, on Four Mile Creek, a tributary of the Flint about four miles south of modern Bainbridge, Georgia (third Fowltown). It was much closer to Miccosukee and Tallahassee, where related Indians lived.

Fort Scott had by now replaced Camp Crawford, but Clinch received order to abandon it, as a cost-cutting measure, and concentrate his forces at Fort Gaines. The Red Sticks soon occupied the Fort, took everything that caretaker Thomas Perryman had stocked, made him leave, and burned it to the ground. Neamathla threatened Gaines with violence if he and his men crossed to the east bank of the Flint, which he considered the border of Spanish Florida. (A side effect was that Gaines requested the border be surveyed, for the first time.)

Fort Scott was restaffed, and troops under Gaines invaded Fowltown (the third Fowltown), crossing the Flint, in November 1817. The Creeks were taken by surprise and fled into the surrounding swamp. In Neamathla's home the troops found "a British uniform coat (scarlett) with a pair of gold epaulettes, and a certificate signed by a British Captain of Marines". A second column of troops ascended the east bank of the Flint to attack Fowltown from the south. The Indians were driven into the swamp, and the U.S. forces began building a new fort, Fort Hughes, on Burges's Bluff. "This is considered the spark that ignited the First Seminole War". (Some date the beginning at 1816, at the Negro Fort assault and destruction.)

The result of the U.S. Army raids, during which Neamathla was supposed to be captured and flogged, was that Black Seminoles came from some distance away to assist the Red Sticks. An assault, the Battle of Ocheesee, look place on a U.S. supply boat traveling upriver, one mile from the fork in the Apalachicola, at modern Chattahoochee, Florida. The boat was not taken but it and other boats were pinned down. The Red Sticks assaulted Fort Hughes unsuccessfully, but the Army decided to abandon it as impossible to supply, only three weeks after its founding. Another expedition from Fort Scott to Fowltown burned the town, and Neamathla led his people to a new site for Fowltown, on the east side of Lake Miccosukee in modern Jefferson County, Florida (the fourth Fowltown). It was burned in 1818 by General Gaines during Andrew Jackson's invasion of Spanish Florida. This was the end of Fowltown.

Neamathla reemerged in a new town called Cohowofooche on the site of modern Tallahassee, Florida. "He begrudgingly allowed a new capital to be built there." "In October 1823, territorial commissioners John Lee Williams and William Simmons met with Neamathla to tell him of the new territory's plan [to] locate its capital in Tallahassee. Neamathla objected but gave his grudging approval with the stipulation they not tell other Seminoles of his consent. A year later, Neamathla threatened to make the streets of Tallahassee “run red with blood,” unless the white settlers left. "DuVal, backed by a regiment of U.S. Army soldiers, met with Neamathla and his 600 warriors. DuVal illegally deposed Neamathla as head of the Seminoles, and ordered the Indians to a reservation near Tampa."

== Final years ==
Neamathla, who even Andrew Jackson recommended be left alone, was offered a 2 square miles (5.2 km^{2}) reservation in Gadsden County, Florida. Neamathla refused to live there, and relocated to what was left of the Creek nation. "He returned to Hitchiti, the town of his ancestors, and was an important chief there by the time of the 1833 Creek census." After an unsuccessful revolt in 1836, he was forced to walk, along with the other Creeks, the Trail of Tears to Oklahoma.

The following description is by Florida Territorial Governor William Pope Duval, as told by him to Washington Irving:

He was a remarkable man; upward of sixty years of age, about six feet high, with a fine eye, and a strongly marked countenance, over which he possessed great command. His hatred of the white men appeared to be mixed with contempt: on the common people he looked down with infinite scorn. He seemed unwilling to acknowledge any superiority of rank or dignity in Governor Duval, claiming to associate with him on terms of equality, as two great chieftains. Though he had been prevailed upon to sign the treaty, his heart revolted at it. In one of his frank conversations with Governor Duval, he observed: "This country belongs to the red man; and if I had the number of warriors at my command that this nation once had I would not leave a white man on my lands. I would exterminate the whole. I can say this to you, for you can understand me: you are a man; but I would not say it to your people. They'd cry out I was a savage, and would take my life. They cannot appreciate the feelings of a man that loves his country."

== Legacy ==
- A street in northeast Leon County, Florida, Neamathla Trail, is named for him.
