= HMS Richmond (1806) =

UK naval brig (1806–1814) and merchant ship (1815–1826)

History

United Kingdom
- Name: HMS Richmond
- Ordered: 23 August 1805
- Builder: (Charles) Greenwood & (Thomas) Kidwell, Itchenor
- Laid down: November 1805
- Launched: February 1806
- Honours and awards: Naval General Service Medal with clasp "19 Apl. Boat Service 1807"
- Fate: Sold 1814

General characteristics
- Class & type: Confounder-class gunbrig
- Tons burthen: 183, or 18334/94 (bm)
- Length: Overall: 84 ft 3 in (25.7 m); Keel: 69 ft 10 3/4 in (21.3 m)
- Beam: 22 ft 2 1/2 in (6.8 m)
- Depth of hold: 11 ft 0 in (3.4 m)
- Sail plan: Brig
- Complement: 50
- Armament: 10 × 18-pounder carronades + 2 × 6-pounder chase guns

History

United Kingdom
- Name: Ben Jonson
- Namesake: Ben Jonson
- Launched: 18 February 1806
- Acquired: 1815
- Fate: Possibly condemned 1826

General characteristics
- Tons burthen: 197, or 198, or 20533/94 (bm)
- Length: 89 ft 3 in (27.2 m)
- Beam: 22 ft 0 in (6.7 m)

HMS Richmond was a Confounder-class gunbrig, launched at Itchenor in February 1806. She captured several small privateers and merchantmen off the Iberian peninsula before the Royal Navy sold her in 1814. (One of these actions resulted in her boats qualifying for a clasp to the Naval General Service Medal.) After the Navy sold her, she became the mercantile Ben Jonson.

Ben Jonson, launched at Itchenor in February 1806, first appeared in online resources in 1815, as a West Indiaman. She then traded with Odessa, and the Cape of Good Hope (the Cape). She started trading with Mauritius, and was last reported having come into Mauritius in 1826 very leaky.

== HMS Richmond ==
Lieutenant Samuel Heming commissioned Richmond in March 1806.

In June 1806, Richmond detained the American vessel Delaware, Ferier, master, which had been sailing from Amsterdam to New York, and sent her into Portsmouth. Delaware was liberated and resumed her voyage, sailing from Portsmouth on 8 June.

On 28 September Richmond sailed from Falmouth with the trade for Portugal, but separated from them in a gale on 7 October. She then returned to Falmouth, expecting the merchant vessels to have returned too. When Richmond discovered that the merchant vessels had not returned, she immediately set out to catch up with them. One or two merchant vessels waiting in Falmouth Roads, went with her.

On 20 April 1807 Lieutenant Heming sighted a lugger under Spanish colours, sheltering in a small bay some six leagues north of "Peruche" (possibly Pederneira on the coast of Portugal). After night fall, he sent in Richmond's boats. They returned with the lugger in tow. The lugger Galliard, of Vigo, was armed with four 4-pounder guns and had a crew of more than 36 men. The Spaniards fired their guns at the British sailors as they approached, before abandoning her. The British suffered five men wounded. The British captured 12 men, some of whom were wounded, including the captain. Heming destroyed the lugger. In 1847 the Admiralty authorized the Naval General Service Medal with clasp "19 Apl. Boat Service 1807" to all survivors from the action; none were issued.

Later, Richmond sailed to the North Sea. On 21 August 1807, Richmond captured the Danish merchant ship Œconomie.

In 1808 Lieutenant J(ohn or James) Walker commissioned Richmond for the North Sea. On 11 May Richmond captured the Dutch dogger Elizabeth.

The hired armed cutter Princess Augusta was in company with Richmond and Skylark when they captured the Dutch fishing vessels Meernia, Johanna, and Stadt Olderberg on 20 August 1808.

On 5 May 1809 Richmond sailed from Sheerness as escort to a fleet for Heligoland. Lloyd's List reported in December that Richmond had taken Palafox into Heligoland. Palafox had run ashore. (Note: Palafox of 76 tons (bm), was a Danish prize that traded between London and Heligoland.)

Between 30 July and 18 August 1809, Richmond participated in the unsuccessful and ill-fated Walcheren Campaign.

On 21 October Richmond was in company with the brig Musquito when they captured the galliot Fortuna. On 30 October, Musquito and Richmond captured Fortuna. Whether these are the same or different vessels is an open question.

On 2 May 1810 Richmond sailed from The Nore as escort to a fleet for Heligoland. She ran aground on the Gunfleet Sands. HMS Centinel came from the Nore on 4 May to take charge of the convoy.

On 29 September 1810 Richmond sailed for the Mediterranean.

In May 1811, Lieutenant David Ewen Bartholomew took command of Richmond off the coast of Spain.

On 14 June he captured a French privateer pierced for 10 guns, with a crew of 50 men, near Malaga.

Subsequently Richmond fired on the castle at Frangerola while her boats brought out a vessel from under the walls.

On 5 February 1812 Richmond sighted the French privateer Intrepide east of the Cap du Gatt on the coast of Grenada. Five hours later Intrepide was sighted anchored in a bay under Cape Cope and Richmond sailed towards her. As she did so, Intrepide fired several broadsides, but when Richmond returned fire at close range, the privateer's crew set fire to their vessel and took to their boats. Boats from Richmond cut Intrepide's cables and started to tow her out. They had gone about a mile when she blew up, fortunately with no casualties. Intrepide was a polacre, fitted out at Malaga and commanded by one Barbastro. She had been armed with eighteen 12-pounder guns and had carried a crew of 180 men. Richmond suffered no casualties.

On 1 March 1812 Richmond drove ashore and destroyed an eight-gun privateer bound from Algiers to Malaga with a cargo of flour for the garrison there. Lieutenant Bartholomew was promoted to commander on 21 March 1812. On 13 September Richmond was at Malta, having come from Gibraltar.

Lieutenant Peter Williams replaced Bartholomew, off Portugal. Williams assumed command of the cutter HMS Nimble on 5 April 1813. Lieutenant Edward Shaughnessy (or O'Shaughnessy) replaced Williams.

On 5 September 1813 Lavinia, Wyllie, master, arrived at Gibraltar. She had been on her way from London to Gibraltar when a French privateer had captured her. Richmond had recaptured Lavinia and had set her to Gibraltar. (Note: Lavinia, of 131 tons (bm), had been launched in Kincardine in 1812. She traded between London and Gibraltar.)

On 27 June 1814 Richmond arrived at Gravesend from Oporto.

Disposal: The "Principal Officers and Commissioners of His Majesty's Navy" offered the "Richmond gun-brig of 183 tons", lying at Deptford, for sale on 29 September 1814. Richmond sold for £820 at Deptford on 29 September 1814.

== Ben Jonson ==
Ben Jonson did not appear in any ship arrival and departure data prior to 1815, nor did any vessel answering to her description appear in Lloyd's List (LR), but under another name. She first appeared in Lloyd's List (LR) in 1815.

Year	Master	Owner	Trade	Source & notes
1815	R.Watson	Allen & Co.	London–Berbice	LR; new wales, upper works, and deck 1815
1818	G.Heseltine	Allen & Co.	London–Sandomingo	LR; new wales, upper works, and deck 1815

On 10 April 1818 Ben Jonson, Gibson, master, was on her way from Cardiff to Constantinople when she came into Falmouth, having lost her main yard, anchor, and other rigging. She arrived at Constantinople on 8 June from Cardiff. However, a letter from Constantinople dated 10 July reported that Ben Jonson had sustained substantial damage having grounded at Cardiff when she stopped there. Her copper sheathing had been destroyed and she would require a thorough repair. A letter dated 25 November 1818 at Constantinople reported that Ben Jonson had come from Odessa. She had sustained slight damage, but would have to land some of her cargo to effect repairs. Following her repairs, she sailed from Constantinople on 6 December for London. On 13 February 1819 she arrived at Stangate Creek, having come from Constantinople and Odessa; on 22 February she arrived at Gravesend.

Next Ben Jonson was at Quebec, having come from Portsmouth. On 17 November she arrived back at Gravesend.

Year	Master	Owner	Trade	Source & notes
1820	G.Hesseltine; G.Smith	Allen & Co.	London–San Domingo; London–Cape of Good Hope	LR; new wales and deck 1815

In 1813 the EIC had lost its monopoly on the trade between India and Britain. British ships were then free to sail to India or the Indian Ocean under a licence from the British East India Company (EIC). However, Ben Jonson did not appear on lists of vessels trading with India under an EIC license.

On 29 September 1824 Ben Jonson, Clenant, master, arrived at Bombay, having come from Mauritius.

== Fate ==
Ben Jonson, Captain Symers sailed from Bengal for the Cape of Good Hope. She arrived at Madras on 1 June 1826; after she left Madras on 8 June 1826, she encountered several gales during which she had to throw some of her cargo overboard. She started making 2½ feet of water an hour in her hold and so put into Mauritius on 22 July to repair. Her remaining cargo was forwarded on Emulous, Wellbank, master.

One report has Ben Jonson being wrecked at Mauritius on 13 August 1826, but with her cargo being saved.
