= HMS Nancy (1794) =

History

Great Britain
- Name: HMS Nancy
- Acquired: c.May 1794 by purchase
- Fate: Sold December 1801

General characteristics
- Type: Fire ship
- Tons burthen: 72 12/94 (bm)
- Length: 55 ft 6 1/2 in (16.929 m) (overall); 43 ft 0 1/2 in (13.1 m) (keel)
- Beam: 17 ft 9 in (5.41 m)
- Depth of hold: 10 ft 1 1/2 in (3.086 m)
- Propulsion: Sails
- Complement: 10
- Armament: Unarmed

HMS Nancy was the mercantile vessel Nancy that the Royal Navy purchased in 1794 for use as a fire ship. She was never expended as a fireship but instead served as a small gunboat. The Navy sold her at Deptford in 1801.

Nancy underwent fitting out at Woolwich between May and 9 August 1794. The Navy commissioned her in June 1794 under Mr. Jeremy Brown. A formal listing of the vessels under the command of Captain Sidney Smith lists her, together with five similar fire ships. In September 1795 Nancy was at the Îles Saint-Marcouf, which the Royal Navy had occupied in July 1795, possibly at the same time as the British forces there repelled a French attack.

On 10 March 1796 a court martial convened on Pegasus, then at Portsmouth, to try Mr. Mark Moore, commander of Nancy, for embezzlement. The court found him guilty and ordered him dismissed the service, never to serve again in His Majesty's naval service.

Nancy was recommissioned in March 1800 under Lieutenant William Fitzwilliam Owen, for the Downs. An account of the "State of the Navy" described her as a fire vessel, with no guns, and under the command of "Owen".

In late 1801 the hired armed cutter King George, under the command of a Mr. Yawkins (William Yawkins), served under Nelson at his failed attack on Boulogne. On 25 August Nelson came aboard King George to conduct a reconnaissance of the French fleet. In October Nelson gave Owen command over King George as well, with secret instructions to launch a burning Nancy at the French fleet. The fire attack did not occur and Nancy was sold in December.
