= Scott massacre =

Coordinates: 30.7006°N 84.8568°W

The Scott Massacre, coming after the Fort Mims massacre, was a major factor in convincing the United States government that the Red Stick Creeks and their Native American allies must be defeated, beginning the Seminole Wars. It took place at the end of November 1817 near present-day Chattahoochee, Florida. Several hundred Creek (Muscogee) warriors known as Red Sticks, led by Homathlimico, with Josiah Francis in the rear, attacked an American military vessel commanded by Lieutenant Richard W. Scott. The keel boat was heading up the Apalachicola River to supply Camp Crawford on the Flint River in southwest Georgia; the attack was at the confluence of the rivers (Nicolls' Outpost).

Besides the supplies, the boat carried 20 sick soldiers, seven women, four children, and a guard of 20 armed soldiers. After a bloody massacre and scalping, only seven survived, one woman, and six soldiers who escaped by jumping into the river and swimming to the opposite shore, where friendly Creeks helped them reach safety at Camp Crawford on December 2, 1817.

The children were killed by having their heads bashed against the sides of the boat. Scott was killed by having splinters of fatwood driven into his body and set afire, "an excruciating form of execution that had its roots deep in the ancient traditions of the Creek Indians".

News of the massacre was immediately sent by the camp commander, Gen. Edmund P. Gaines, to Secretary of War John C. Calhoun, and Gen. Andrew Jackson. It was reported widely in the American press. "An infuriated President James Monroe directed that General Jackson be ordered to the frontier and that the Seminoles and Red Sticks be punished without regard to whether they were in the United States or Spanish Florida."

This is considered by some historians as one of the earliest engagements of what would become of the First Seminole War. (Note: Because the First Seminole War was not an officially declared war, several other 1816–1818 confrontations have been suggested as the beginning. See Battle of Negro Fort for example.) The attack was soon followed by the Battle of Ocheesee. Camp Crawford was renamed Fort Scott in the boat commander's honor.
