= Battle of Fowltown =

1817 battle in Georgia, US

Coordinates: 30°47.942′N 84°36.619′W

Fowltown Creek, near modern Albany, Georgia, was where "Neamathla's band of Tuttollossees had lived...before relocating down to modern Decatur and Seminole Counties." Although some of Neamathla's people at one time lived in Seminole County, Georgia, Fowltown was never in that county.

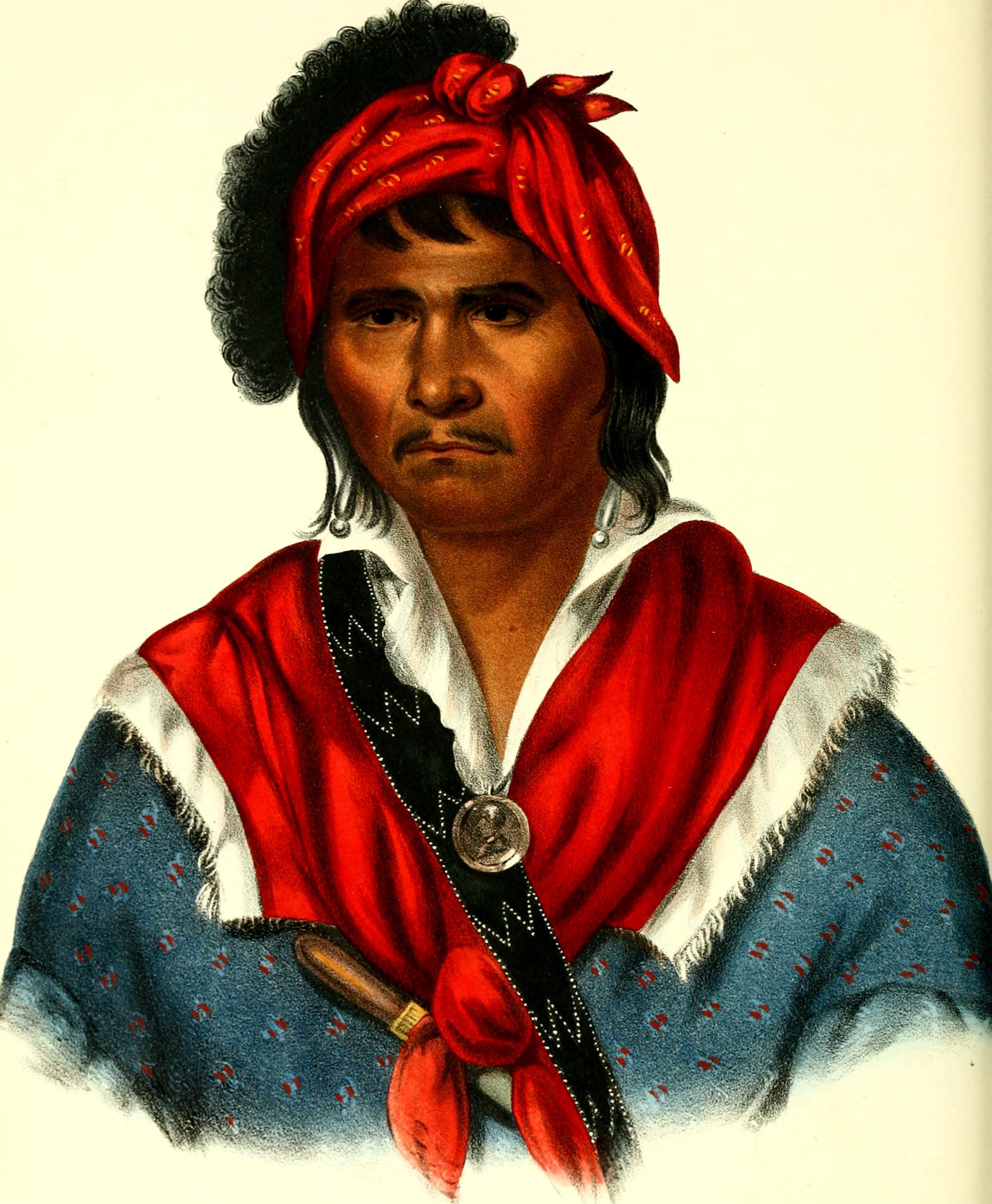
Neamathla

There were multiple different locations for Fowltown, all settled by the same group of Mikasuki people who were led by Neamathla, forced to relocate four times in three years.

1. The oldest and largest one was on the southeastern bank of the Flint River (Georgia), a few miles from its merger with the Chattahoochee to form the Apalachicola River, in southwest Georgia (modern Decatur County). European references to it begin in the late 18th century. "The name is translated from the term Tutakosi Talofa, which in the Hitchiti language means 'Chicken Town' or 'Fowl Town'." It was evacuated in 1813–1814. In 1799 its population was about 59, "but this number had grown to several hundred by 1813".

2. The second (1814–1816) was in Spanish Florida, on the west bank of the Chattahoochee River, across from Tocktoethla ("River Junction"), in modern Jackson County, Florida.

3. The third (1816) was also on the south bank of the Flint, four miles southwest of modern Bainbridge, Georgia, adjacent to Fowltown Swamp, also in Decatur County, Georgia.

This was the location of the Battle of Fowltown, a symbolically important but militarily very minor encounter. Chief Neamathla of Fowltown became embroiled in a dispute with the commander of Fort Scott over ownership of the land on the southeastern side of the Flint River, claiming Mikasuki sovereignty over the area. The land in southern Georgia had been ceded by the Red Sticks in the Treaty of Fort Jackson, but the Mikasukis did not consider themselves Creek, and did not feel bound by the treaty which they had not signed, and did not accept that the Creek people had any right to cede Mikasuki land.

In November 1817, General Gaines sent a force of 250 men to destroy Fowltown and capture Neamathla. The first attempt was beaten back by the Mikasukis. A few days later, an attack by a larger party of U.S. soldiers forced the Mikasuki to retreat into the surrounding swamp, abandon this land, and reestablish themselves further south. Neamathla was not captured. Some historians date the start of the First Seminole War to the 1817 attack on this Fowltown, which immediately preceded the Scott Massacre. Also, David Brydie Mitchell, former governor of Georgia and Creek Indian agent at the time, stated in a report to Congress that this attack on Fowltown was the start of the First Seminole War.

4. The final Fowltown was also in Spanish Florida, on the eastern shore of Lake Miccosukee, in modern Jefferson County, Florida.

== See also ==
- Fowltown, Georgia
- Historical Marker
