= Berwick Packet (1798 ship) =

Packet class mercantile vessel

History

Great Britain
- Name: Berwick Packet
- Launched: 1798, Berwick
- Fate: Wrecked 10 November 1827

General characteristics
- Tons burthen: 106, or 108 (bm)
- Sail plan: Smack
- Armament: 6 × 12-pounder carronades

Berwick Packet was a smack launched at Berwick in 1798. She sailed for some years for the Old Ship Company, of Berwick in the packet trade between London and Berwick. After a change of ownership and homeport around 1806, Berwick Packet traded more widely. In 1808 she repelled an attack by a French privateer. Then in 1809 Berwick Packet served briefly as a transport in a naval campaign. She next returned to mercantile trade until she was wrecked in November 1827 on a voyage from the Baltic.

== Career ==
Berwick Packet first appeared in Lloyd's Register (LR) in 1799.

| Year | Master | Owner | Trade | Source |
|---|---|---|---|---|
| 1799 | Patterson | Captain | Leith–London | LR |
| 1807 | J.Patterson; J.Jameson | Patterson; Anderson | London–Berwick; Hull–Tonning | LR |

Leith Packet was wrecked at "Sandhale" on 8 March 1807. She was on a voyage from Leith, to Hull. Five of her eight crew survived until 11 March, when Berwick Packet, Jameson, master, rescued them. All the crew had taken to her rigging, but the cook, the master, and his son died of exhaustion in the 33 hours before Berwick Packet rescued them. During the time of the crew's exposure, people on shore gathering what had washed ashore saw the crew's plight, but made no efforts to render assistance.

On 17 February 1808 Berwick Packet, Jameson, master, was off Dimlinton when a French privateer twice attempted to board her. She drove off the attack by firing a 12-pounder. (Note: Berwick Packet was armed with six 12-pounder carronades, courtesy of a government program of arming merchantmen to enable them to protect themselves from French privateers.)

The Royal Navy hired Berwick Packet on 26 June 1809. She was one of 15 small transports that the Navy hired for the ill-fated Walcheren Campaign. Her commander was Lieutenant David Ewen Bartholomew. Her first assignment was to carry Congreve rockets from the Woolwich Arsenal to Walcheren. She participated in the capture of Flushing and was generally useful for the remainder of the campaign. The Navy returned Berwick Packet to her owners on 28 October. Berwick Packet was the only vessel of the 15 transports actually listed by name in the prize money notice.

| Year | Master | Owner | Trade | Source |
|---|---|---|---|---|
| 1812 | J.Jameson; Armstrong | Anderson | London–Gibraltar | LR |

Berwick Packet, Armstrong, master, arrived at Plymouth in November 1812 from Cadiz. She had developed a leak after having struck the Seven Stone, near Scilly. She was going to unload.

| Year | Master | Owner | Trade | Source & notes |
|---|---|---|---|---|
| 1814 | Armstrong | Anderson & Co. | London–Limerick | LR; damages repaired 1812 |
| 1815 | Armstrong; J.Fry | Anderson & Co. | London–Limerick | LR; damages repaired 1812 |
| 1816 | J.Fry | Fry | London | LR; damages repaired 1812 & rebuilt 1816 |
| 1824 | J.Fry; Hughes | W.Fry | Cork | LR; rebuilt 1816 |

== Fate ==
On 10 November 1827 Berwick Packet, Hughes, master, was driven ashore at Gothenburg, Sweden. She was on a voyage from Saint Petersburg to Leghorn. Most of the cargo was saved but the vessel herself was a wreck.
