= Edward Nicolls =

British Royal Marines officer and colonial administrator (c.1779–1865)

General Sir Edward Nicolls KCB
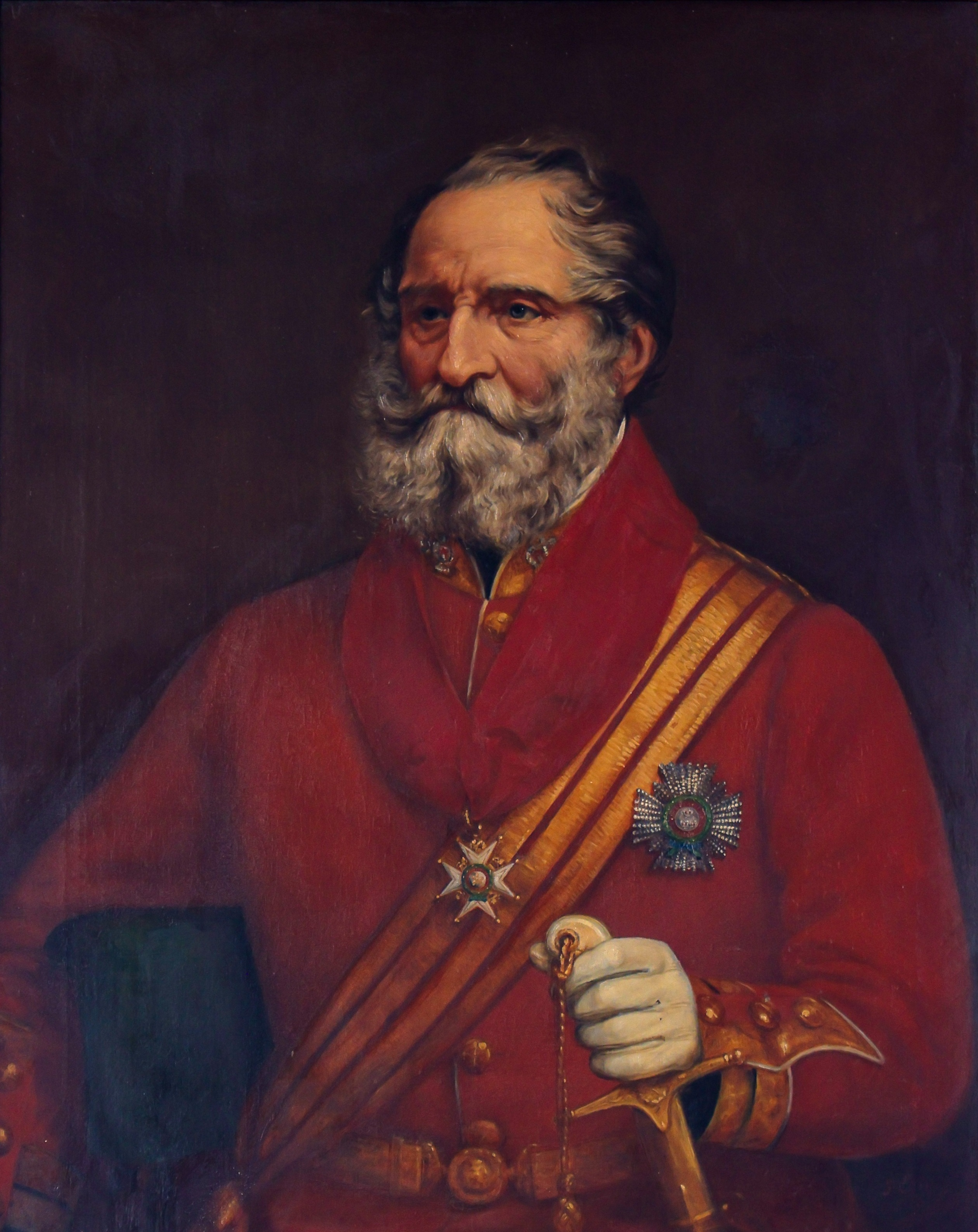
- The only known portrait of Nicolls

2nd Superintendent of Fernando Po
- In office 4 April 1829 – 29 August 1832
- Preceded by: William Fitzwilliam Owen
- Succeeded by: John Beecroft

5th Commandant of Ascension Island
- In office 21 March 1823 – 3 November 1828
- Preceded by: Robert Campbell
- Succeeded by: William Bate

Personal details
- Born: c. 1779 Coleraine, County Londonderry
- Died: 5 February 1865 (aged 85) Blackheath, London
- Awards: Mentioned in despatches; Knight Commander of the Order of the Bath (1855)

Military service
- Allegiance: Great Britain; United Kingdom
- Branch/service: Royal Marines
- Service years: 1795–1835
- Rank: General
- Conflicts: War of the Third Coalition; War of the Fourth Coalition; War of 1812

General Sir Edward Nicolls KCB (c. 1779 – 5 February 1865) was a British Royal Marines officer and colonial administrator who served in the French Revolutionary and Napoleonic Wars and War of 1812. Known as "Fighting Nicolls", he had a distinguished military career, and according to his obituary in The Times, Nicolls fought "in no fewer than 107 actions, in various parts of the world" and had "his left leg broken and his right leg severely injured, was shot through the body and right arm, had received a severe sabre cut in the head, was bayoneted in the chest, and had lost the sight of an eye."

Nicolls was born in Coleraine, Ireland into a family with a military tradition; his father was surveyor of excise in Coleraine, and his maternal grandfather was a rector. Nicolls spent his life as an intensely devout Ulster Protestant. He had two years of school in Greenwich, but enlisted in the Royal Navy at the age of 11. In 1795, at the age of 16, he received his first commission in the Royal Marines and soon began service with shipborne detachments of marines. During the Napoleonic Wars and associated conflicts in the Caribbean, Mediterranean, and North Sea, he served as a commander of ships' detachments, and gained his reputation for ferocity and courage.

Connected with his religious beliefs, Nicolls was a committed abolitionist, as well as an advocate for Native Americans and a leader of the Hibernian Temperance Society. During the War of 1812, Nicolls was posted to Spanish Florida as part of the British attempt to recruit local allies in the southern front against the United States. He set up a base at Prospect Bluff, on the Apalachicola River, and had a sturdy fort built there, where he recruited Native Americans and a black Corps of Colonial Marines. He later established Nicolls' Outpost sixty miles to the north. Nicolls's marines, and their Creek and Seminole allies, fought at Fort Bowyer, but the war ended in early 1815, which stalled their offensive towards Georgia. He was present at the Battle of New Orleans. He returned to Britain with a Treaty of Nicolls' Outpost he had negotiated, but failed to receive support from his government for any further aid to his erstwhile native allies.

From 1823 to 1828, he was the Commandant of Ascension Island in the South Atlantic, which was followed by a posting from 1829 to 1835, as Superintendent of Fernando Po, off the coast of Africa, an important base in British operations against the Atlantic slave trade. In 1835, Nicolls retired from the Royal Marines with the rank of a lieutenant colonel. For his service, Nicolls was made a Knight Commander of the Order of the Bath in 1855—among other honours—and was promoted to the rank of full general in his retirement.

== Early life ==
Edward Nicolls was born in 1779 in Coleraine, Ireland, the son of Jonathan Nicolls and Anna Cuppage. Jonathan Nicolls (died 1818) was for a time controller of excise for Coleraine. Anna Cuppage (1757?–1845) was a daughter of the Reverend Burke Cuppage, rector of Coleraine, a close kinsman and friend of Edmund Burke. Anna had an older brother William Cuppage (1756–1832), who had an appointment secured for him at the Royal Military Academy, Woolwich by Edmund Burke. William was later a lieutenant general of the Royal Artillery and a neighbour of Edward Nicolls in Woolwich.

Edward was the oldest of six siblings, and some of his brothers had distinguished military careers as well, including Lieutenant Colonel William Burke Nicolls (1780–1844) of the British Army's 2nd West India Regiment, and Commander Jonathan Frederick Nicolls (1782–1845) of the Royal Navy. All five of Edward Nicolls's brothers and both of his sons died in or as the result of public service. Nicolls was educated at a grammar school in Coleraine and for two years at Royal Park Academy near Greenwich prior to entering the Marines on 24 March 1795; (Note: Promotions: 2nd Lieut. 24 Mar 95, Lieut. 27 Jan 96, Captain. 25 Jul 05, Major. 8 Aug 10, Lieut. Colonel. 12 Aug 19, Colonel. 10 Jan 37, Major. General. 9 Nov 46, Lieut. General. 20 Jun 54, General. 28 Nov 55.) this was the extent of his formal education. He was not yet 16 years old when he received his commission as a second lieutenant in His Majesty's Marine Forces, in 1795, and he was promoted to first lieutenant on 27 January 1796.

== Career ==
=== Napoleonic Wars ===
It was during his early career, during the Napoleonic Wars, that Nicolls earned his reputation as "Fighting Nicolls", for as an officer on small ships, he was engaged in numerous fierce actions on small boats and at gun batteries. On 5 November 1803, during the blockade of Saint-Domingue, Lieutenant Nicolls took a 12-man cutting-out party in the cutter from HMS Blanche and captured the French cutter Albion from under the battery at Monte Christi. Albion had a crew of 43 men and was armed with two 4-pounder guns and six swivel guns. The British lost two dead, and two wounded including Nicolls. In single combat, the French captain wounded Nicolls severely with a pistol shot before himself being killed. For his courage in this action, Nicolls was awarded with a sword of honour valued at £30 by the committee of Lloyds. In 1804 Nicolls led another boat assault in the capture of a French brig, and led a landing party of Royal Marines in the successful siege of Franco-Dutch forces at Curaçao. Nicolls and his men withstood 28 consecutive days of continuous enemy assaults on their positions.

On 25 July 1805, Nicolls was promoted to the rank of captain, and assigned command of a company which embarked in HMS Standard. During 1807 and 1808, Nicolls participated in the siege of Corfu and in a foray to Egypt. It was during this period, too, that he was honourably mentioned in despatches for his part in the Dardanelles Operation, during which he captured a Turkish flag. In 1808 he led the boat attack from the Standard which captured the Italian gunboat Volpe off Corfu.

In 1808 he made a brief return to England to get married. In 1809, Nicolls commanded HMS Standard's marines while the ship participated in the Gunboat War. On 18 May Nicolls's marines assisted marines and seamen under the command of Captain William Selby of HMS Owen Glendower in the capture of the island of Anholt. In the skirmish, a Danish garrison of 170 men put up a sharp but ineffectual resistance that killed one British marine and wounded two before surrendering. Following the capture of Anholt, Nicolls was briefly assigned as the British military governor of the island. On 8 August 1810, Nicolls received the brevet rank of major, the first Royal Marine officer to be granted this promotion for shore service.

In May 1812, a court martial of Brevet Major Nicolls was held. For all thirteen charges, he was acquitted, and only reprimanded.

Nicolls was aboard HMS Victory, moored at Gothenburg, when the Crown Prince of Sweden came aboard on 20 September 1812 for a formal reception. Newspaper reports state that Nicolls was rumoured to be 'expected to be appointed one of his Aides-de-Camp.' On 21 October 1812, HMS Thistle arrived at Yarmouth via Gothenburg, having departed St Petersburg. It disembarked Nicolls, carrying dispatches from Lord Cathcart.

=== War of 1812 ===
With the re-commissioning of HMS Tonnant at the start of 1814, there was a vacancy for the Officer Commanding the ship's detachment of Royal Marines. Nicolls took up this position. The last act of the disgraced Lord Cochrane was to forward to the Admiralty a request from Nicolls. He wanted the detachment aboard HMS Tonnant to include two chosen men, and for the boys to be replaced with 'efficient Privates' prior to the deployment of the Tonnant. He remained aboard until 4 July 1814, when he embarked Hermes, for passage to Florida.

A battalion of Royal Marines was embarked aboard various ships, its artillery detachment aboard the Tonnant. They set sail on 7 April, the artillery and Nicolls were disembarked at Bermuda upon arrival on 9 June. A cadre of 12 Royal Marine gunners (with two howitzers and a field piece) and 96 Royal Marine infantry were transferred to HMS Hermes and HMS Carron, to accompany Nicolls to Florida.

==== Posting to Florida ====
During the War of 1812, Nicolls was posted to Spanish Florida as part of an attempt to recruit the Seminoles as allies against the United States. Throughout the war, the British also recruited black locals to fight on their side, including those enslaved by American owners. As a fervent abolitionist, Nicolls gave particular energy toward this effort. He was to operate from a position established in April 1814 at Prospect Bluff (the "British post"). Sailing from Bermuda in the summer of 1814, the expedition Nicolls commanded stopped in Spanish Havana, where it was told not to land in Florida without prior request by the Captain General, Juan Ruiz de Apodaca. Nicolls arrived at Apalachicola, Florida on 13 August 1814. The Governor of West Florida subsequently requested the redeployment of British forces to Pensacola. (Note: Captain Percy to Admiral Cochrane: 'I assented to re-embark the marines and proceed to that place; acquainting him [Nicolls] at the same time with my firm determination, in the event of not receiving a request from the Governor to land them, immediately to return to the anchorage off the Apalachicola, as I had promised the Captain-General, at the Havannah, not to land on Spanish territory without being requested to do so.' 'On the 21st August I left Apalachicola, and arrived at this anchorage on the 23rd; having fallen in with, off the bar, and brought with me sloop Sophie. I fortunately found that a letter from the governor had been sent to me, requiring the naval force might be brought down, as he was threatened with an attack by the Americans: on the next morning I waited on the governor, when he requested me to disembark the detachment, ammunition, &c. which I immediately complied with. The fort San Miguel, the only one near the town, was put into the hands of Lieutenant-Colonel Nicolls; and the British colours were hoisted in conjunction with the Spanish, which he informed me was done with the governor's approbation.')

At Pensacola on 26 August 1814, Nicolls issued an order of the day for the 'First Colonial battalion of the Royal Corps of Marines', and at the same time issued a widely disseminated proclamation to the people of Louisiana, urging them to join forces with the British and Indian allies against the American government. Both documents were reproduced in Niles' Register of Baltimore. (Note: The proclamation was partly published, albeit the section about the future rights of fugitive slaves who fought for Britain was omitted in the censored version.) These were a ruse as to the real strength of the British. The "numerous British and Spanish squadron of ships and vessels of war" he described comprised two sloops and two sixth-rates of the Royal Navy, the "good train of artillery" comprised three cannon and twelve gunners, whilst the "battalion" was a company-strength group of 100 Royal Marines infantry, detached from Major George Lewis's battalion.

The numbers of Colonial Marines and Redstick Creeks are difficult to ascertain, although Nicolls did arrive in Florida with 300 British uniforms and 1000 muskets. Manrique cooperated with Nicolls, allowing him to train and drill Muscogee Creek refugees. Their fighting force having been defeated at the Battle of Horseshoe Bend in March, the few hundred Redstick Creeks still alive arrived en masse at British Post, on the verge of starvation and with no possessions other than the clothes they were wearing. There were so many of them that feeding them was a serious problem: there were deaths from starvation. Nicolls still attempted to broaden the forces on the side of the British, and he is mentioned as participating in attempts to recruit Jean Lafitte to the British cause.

==== Fort Bowyer and New Orleans ====
Nicolls participated in an unsuccessful land and naval attack on Fort Bowyer on 15 September. In the fighting, Nicolls was wounded severely three times, and he lost the use of his right eye for life. The taking of Pensacola in November by an American force under Andrew Jackson forced Nicolls to retreat the following day to the Apalachicola River with freed and escaped slaves from Pensacola. There, Nicolls regrouped at Prospect Bluff, and rallied Indians and refugee ex-slaves living free in Florida, recruiting the latter into his detached unit of the Corps of Colonial Marines.

At the start of December, Nicolls was directed to join the expedition against New Orleans. HMS Anaconda, moored at Apalachicola, Florida to embark Nicolls, who joined General Edward Pakenham's force, accompanied by a handful of tribal elders and their entourage. At the Battle of New Orleans on 8 January 1815, Royal Marines were attached to the brigade commanded by Colonel William Thornton of the 85th Regiment of Foot (Bucks Volunteers), tasked with an amphibious attack on the right bank of the Mississippi. Nicolls was the senior-ranking field officer of the Royal Marines present at the battle, but Vice Admiral Alexander Cochrane forbade Nicolls to take part in the fighting personally, fearing that mishap to Nicolls might deprive the British of their most competent officer serving with the Creeks and Seminoles. (Note: Nicolls's obituary in The Gentleman's Magazine and Historical Review states that "He was the senior [Royal Marine] major of all the force before New Orleans in 1815, and as such urged his right to lead the battalion of Royal Marines in the assault. This honour was refused, on the ground that if any accident befell him there would be no other officer competent to command his Indian Army [sic]; in consequence of this, he lost the decoration of the Bath, which was conferred on Major Adair, R.M., who so nobly led the battalion." On the same page it was additionally recalled that Nicolls was still suffering from the effects of three serious wounds received in the attack on Fort Bowyer just months earlier.) The actual battlefield command of the 100 Royal Marines brigaded with the 85th Foot went to a less senior officer, Major Thomas Benjamin Adair, commanding officer of the Marine detachment on HMS Vengeur. Nicolls embarked HMS Erebus on 10 January at Cat Island Roads, and disembarked at Apalachicola on 25 January, accompanied by several Creek warriors, a number of Royal Marine reinforcements, and a Company of the 5th West India Regiment. Cochrane sent the transports Mars and Florida, along with the Erebus, with presents for the Indians and provisions for the garrison.

==== End of the war ====
The start of 1815 was to have seen a British offensive in the south, with the Royal Marine Battalions to advance westward into Georgia, to be joined by Nicolls and his forces from the Gulf Coast. (Note: 'Intended route of operations by the Detachment and Indians under Major Nicolls' dated 6 January 1815, fron Nicolls to Cochrane) These plans were overtaken by events, as peace was declared following the conclusion of the Treaty of Ghent. With the offensive cancelled, Nicolls and his men returned to Prospect Bluff at the end of March. On 15 March 1815, a U.S. Army aide-de-camp named Walter Bourke communicated to Major General Thomas Pinckney that conditions were difficult on the Georgia frontier despite efforts to reinforce American defences, and to negotiate the return of slaves who had joined the Corps of Colonial Marines under the command of Rear Admiral George Cockburn still at Cumberland Island. Cockburn was not inclined to voluntarily hand over British military personnel who risked being returned to slavery by the Americans, and professed difficulty in communicating news of the Treaty of Ghent to Nicolls.

Prior to returning to Great Britain, Nicolls contributed to these post-war diplomatic tensions between the United Kingdom and the United States, by attempting to represent the interests of the Native Americans and blacks who had taken up arms on the British side. On his own initiative, he negotiated and presented a Treaty of Nicolls' Outpost between the United Kingdom and the Creeks and Seminoles, in which a formal alliance would have been created whereby the British would provide diplomatic support for the Indian nations. Nicolls engaged in a heated exchange of letters with U.S. Indian Agent Benjamin Hawkins. Hawkins accused Nicolls of being overzealous and of overstepping his authority in his personal defense of Redstick Creeks, Seminoles, and their maroon Creole allies, whom some Americans in authority viewed as nothing more than runaway slaves, lost or unclaimed property.

Similar tensions existed with the Spanish. Writing from HMS Royal Oak, off Mobile Bay, on 15 March 1815, Rear Admiral Pulteney Malcolm, Cochrane's subordinate commander of the Mobile Squadron, assured Mateo González Manrique, the Governor at Pensacola, that Post-Captain Robert Cavendish Spencer (a son of George Spencer, 2nd Earl Spencer) of HMS Carron, had been detailed to conduct a strict enquiry into the conduct of Nicolls and Captain George Woodbine (who had served under Nicolls), regarding the property losses of Spanish inhabitants of Florida. Malcolm believed that in cases where former slaves could not be persuaded to return to their owners, the British government would undertake to remunerate the owners.

Spencer told the Spanish fugitives that they could not be transported to British territory, (Note: [Spencer] solemnly declared that, under no circumstances, were [Spanish fugitive slaves] to board English ships) (Note: 'The British had no right to harbor slaves who came from Florida... since Cochrane’s original proclamation only offered freedom to fugitive slaves from the United States.') and warned them that he foresaw future vengeful behaviour on the part of the Americans. Nicolls was adamant that the American fugitives could be freed, reported Pintado. (Note: 'They were to be taken to the English colonies and settled there as free men, in accordance with the Cochrane proclamation of 2 April 1814.') In the presence of Pintado, they discharged the enlisted men of the Colonial Marines, settled outstanding accrued pay, and presented each man with a discharge paper. Pintado was angered by what he considered to be manumission documents, coupled with the refusal to forcibly return these men to slavery. (Note: Owsley notes 'When the British finally evacuated Apalachicola, a number of these blacks chose to go with them... Many of them chose to remain near the fort at Prospect Bluff.' Their "choice" in the matter was limited, given limited space in the transport ships.)

British forces were to withdraw under the terms of peace that ended the War of 1812, consequently, upon returning to Prospect Bluff from Georgia at the end of March, Nicolls received orders to withdraw his marines from the fort. (Note: Vice Admiral Cochrane wrote to Nicolls on 14 February, and to Admiral Malcolm on 17 February stating "when Peace is concluded you are to embark Major Nicolls") (Note: 'On 29 March 1815, Malcolm ordered Nicolls to withdraw, believing this restoration [of land to the Creeks] was being honoured and implemented; Nicolls being "on the ground" saw this differently')

Article Nine of the Treaty of Ghent was believed to result in the restoration of the land back to the Creek Indians, and to overturn the Treaty of Fort Jackson. Cochrane instructed Rear Admiral Malcolm 'to remain for the Protection of the Indian establishment at Apalachicola, until such time as they are restored to their possessions in terms of the treaty of peace.' Malcolm was instructed to leave with the Indians the weaponry and supplies they needed for their protection. Nicolls now had the paradox that he was being asked to embark his troops immediately, and to continue to follow the order to remain until the land was restored to the Creek Indians. On 10 March 1815, Nicolls, a champion of Native American rights, created a treaty on his own initiative, without authorisation, at Nicolls' Outpost on the Florida-Georgia border, 60 miles north of Prospect Bluff.

Millett notes that the British had left the fort well armed and supplied, with the aim of helping to protect against incursions by the United States. Whilst Owsley notes that the warlike stores remained when Nicolls departed, this was not exclusively his decision. As Nicolls hoped, the existence of a well-armed Negro Fort (as the U.S. Army soon called it) so close to the U.S. border was an existential threat to American slavery.

==== Return to England ====
The first part of the Royal Marine infantry detachment departed Apalachicola on 15 April 1815 aboard HMS Seahorse, stopped at Havana, then A Coruña. and arrived at Portsmouth on 30 May 1815. The second, and final, part of the Royal Marine infantry detachment embarked on HMS Cydnus on 22 April, (Note: 'Upon my arrival at Prospect Bluff [on 7 April], the [British infantry] officers and other ranks were preparing for the evacuation; and, fifteen days later, this task had been fully completed.') and were duly returned to Ireland Island in Bermuda, arriving on 13 June 1815, to rejoin the 3rd Battalion as a supernumerary company. (Note: 'The 28th March [1815 of] last [year] I found collected there the major part of the Creek Chiefs... These [tribal] kings were actually receiveing[sic] from us presents, pay and obeying Brevet Major Nicolls' orders until 22 April [1815]', whereupon Spencer sailed away.) Cydnus, HMS Carron and HMS Borer departed the anchorage off Apalachicola together.

The transport ship Mars was tasked to embark 'as many of the Black Corps as they can conveniently stowe.' On 16 May the British evacuated the last of the garrison there, aboard the gun-brig Forward, accompanied by the transports Britannia and Mars. (Note: 'He, the Deponent...was discharged in the month of March last on account of Peace, and did embark at Appalachicola on the same day [in May 1815] (on board the Transport Britannia) that Captain Woodbine did also embark on board the Transport Mars... Signed, L Perdue. Sworn before me this 17th day of October 1815. Signed, Thomas Matthews.') Nicolls was accompanied by the Redstick Creek Francis the Prophet, also known as Josiah Francis and Hillis Hadjo, the Native American spiritual and political leader known for his role in the Battle of Holy Ground, seeking official imprimatur for the treaty Nicolls had negotiated. Francis took his son, Earle, with him, hoping the son could stay and get some education. (In September 1815 Nicolls requested to Morier that Earle Francis remain in 'England to learn to read and write,' the Indians appreciating the power of literacy.) Just days prior to his departure in May Nicolls composed a letter on 12 May 1815 to Hawkins, implying that the freed slaves had been shipped off to British territory.

On 7 June 1815, Nicolls, Woodbine, and Francis arrived at Amelia Island in East Florida, where rumours circulated that the officers were seeking to either obtain British possession of Florida from Spain, or to arm and supply the Florida factions resisting American territorial expansion. In fact, Nicolls had been heading to the Bahamas, and had unintentionally ended up in East Florida. (Note: 'I had intended to write to you from the Bahamas ... but being obliged to put in here in distress.') (Note: JUNE 10.-"It is proper your excellency [the Governor of Georgia] should know that on the 7th inst. a brig and transport arrived at Amelia Island, with col. Nichols, captain Woodbine; an Indian Chief, and his son.) Nicolls sent his final reply to Hawkins, and a letter to the most senior British diplomat in Washington, on 12 June 1815. After mooring for a week, Nicolls headed to Bermuda, arriving a fortnight later. (Note: COL. NICOLLS:-It appears that this great man has left the Floridas for Bermuda, in the gun-brig Forward, accompanied by captain Woodbine; an indian chief and about 50 slave troops.) (Note: 27 Colonial Marines disembarked the transports Mars & Britannia on 29 June 1815, and were accommodated aboard HMS Ruby. They were accompanied by seven Colonial Marines who disembarked HMS Forward on 28 June 1815.) Nicolls re-embarked on the brig Forward on 29 June "for passage to England", and disembarked at Portsmouth on 13 August. (Note: Portsmouth, Aug. 13:- The Forward, Lieut. BANKS[sic], arrived here yesterday from Pensacola, last from Bermuda, in 42 days. The Forward had [Mars and Britannia,] two transports under her convoy, with part of the marine artillery on board, from Pensacola, which she was obliged to leave up at Bermuda, to be hove down, in consequence of their being so leaky. Major Nicholls[sic], who had the command of the marine battalion serving in Florida, has come home in the Forward with an Indian Chief, who has greatly distinguished himself by assisting the British against the Americans, in that country.) Nicolls arrived in London on 14 August, and mentioned this in the letter he wrote to the First Secretary to the Admiralty on 15 August 1815.

==== Aftermath ====
Just prior to departing Amelia Island, Nicolls wrote to Anthony St. John Baker, expressing his concern that Article Nine of the Treaty of Ghent, calling for the restoration of Indian lands to their 1811 boundaries, would not be adhered to. (Note: 'I have been [careful] to prevent a shadow of complaint [on the part] of the United States, well knowing the least thing will suffice as an excuse for their attacking the Indians or robbing them of their Lands.')

In England, Nicolls failed to obtain official support for the Creeks, and the Treaty of Nicolls' Outpost was never ratified. (At the time of his departure in May 1815, Nicolls promised his allies to return in six months, according to Hawkins.) While Josiah Francis failed to receive official recognition from the Foreign Office as the representative of "four Indian nations", he did receive recognition as a former Colonel of the British Army in Florida as well as publicized encounters with British notables, before being sent home. Francis returned to Spanish Florida in 1816, continuing to fight for his nation until he and the Seminole leader Nehemathla Micco were captured in April 1818. Nicolls had housed Francis and his son himself and bought them cold-weather clothing out of his own funds, and Francis' son remained with Nicolls to get an English education.

Nicolls was chastised by British government officials for bringing the two Creeks to England, "productive of great Inconvenience and Expence, and entirely unauthorized". The British Secretary of State, Lord Bathurst, dismissed him as a "wild fellow". However, he was retained on full pay status in the duties of a captain and brevet major of the Royal Marines. While he was in America, he had the local rank of lieutenant colonel (by authority of Vice Admiral Cochrane) as he was commander of a battalion of the Corps of Colonial Marines. He was awarded a pension of £250 annually on 28 December 1815 for a total of 24 serious battle wounds suffered, and awarded a sword of honour by Britain's Patriotic Fund. He was made a brevet lieutenant colonel on 12 August 1819.

In the summer of 1817 Captain George Woodbine, one of Nicolls's former subordinate officers, was present in Spanish East Florida together with the former British soldier and Scottish mercenary lieutenant of Simón Bolívar, Gregor MacGregor. Woodbine and MacGregor both left Spanish East Florida to rejoin the Latin American revolutionary movement prior to U.S. military intervention in East Florida. The names of Nicolls, Woodbine, and MacGregor had become associated with the arming of blacks as soldiers, militiamen, and even as mercenaries. The threat, real or imaginary, was an anathema to North American popular conceptions of the time.

Between July and October 1818, the Niles' Weekly Register of Baltimore published portions of correspondence between Nicolls and the former auxiliary Second Lieutenant Robert Chrystie Ambrister (1797–1818) of the first "battalion" of the Corps of Colonial Marines. Ambrister was one of two British subjects executed in the Arbuthnot and Ambrister incident by order of Major General Andrew Jackson following a drumhead trial at Fort St. Marks in April 1818 (the same month and place as the Josiah Francis and Nehemathla Micco summary executions). Andrew Jackson flew a false British flag on his ship to lure them aboard, and summarily executed them in Spanish territorial waters. In the correspondence, assistance was asked of Nicolls to intervene with the British government on behalf of former allies seeking asylum in Spanish West Florida from perceived American wrongdoing and injustice.

=== Ascension Island ===
In 1823, Nicolls became the first commandant of remote and uninhabited Ascension Island, a small volcanic island in the South Atlantic, halfway between South America and Africa. In 1815, HMS Zenobia and HMS Peruvian had taken the island to prevent it from being used as a staging post from which to rescue Napoleon Bonaparte from Saint Helena. From 1815 until Nicolls took over, the Royal Navy registered the island as a "small Sloop of 50 or 60 Men", HMS Ascension, since the Navy was forbidden to govern colonies. The island had a garrison of about thirty, with a few families, servants, and liberated Africans. The Royal Navy came to use the island as a victualling station for ships, particularly those of the West Africa Squadron (or Preventative Squadron), which were working to suppress the transatlantic slave trade.

Water was scarce, and an important task for Nicolls was to ensure that the island had a stable source of water. He achieved this by installing systems of pipes and carts to bring water to the settlement from the few springs in the mountains. Food was mostly shipped from England, but some could be procured locally: fish, a few vegetables grown on the island, feral goats and sheep, fishy-tasting eggs from a tern colony on the island, and turtle meat obtained during the laying season from December to May. Due to Nicolls's efforts in directing the harvest of turtles, turtle meat, an expensive delicacy in England, became so common it was fed to prisoners and pigs, and Marines complained of it. This surfeit of turtle irritated Nicolls's superiors and the Lords of the Admiralty, and when an admiral ordered Nicolls to stop feeding turtle to prisoners, he started selling or bartering it to visiting ships. With this monotonous diet, men on the island relied on rum for spice. Nicolls understood this, and gave large rations of grog when his men showed what he called "spirited and Soldierlike feelings".

On the confines of the island feuds were vicious, and one surgeon went insane. Pirates were frequently seen off Ascension, keeping the garrison on edge. Nicolls was also busied by many infrastructure projects on the island, building roads, water tanks, a storehouse, and developing the gardens on Green Mountain. For these efforts, Nicolls had about sixty freed Africans sent to Ascension, and additionally asked for convicts.

Nicolls was under pressure to keep Ascension’s running costs as low as possible. He repeatedly suggested to the Admiralty that the lime produced on the island should be bartered in exchange for the wood shipped from Fernando Po and Sierra Leone. He claimed that the local stone, if quarried by convicts, could be produced at a cost low enough to generate a profit when sold in London. His plan to ship New Zealand flax to England was discussed in a letter to Henry Bathurst, 3rd Earl Bathurst.

On 3 November 1828 Captain William Bate replaced Nicolls as commandant on Ascension. Nicolls was given the substantive rank of major before leaving, on 8 May 1828.

=== Fernando Po ===
In April 1829, Nicolls was appointed Superintendent of Fernando Po (now Bioko), a tropical island immediately off the coast of Africa, which the West Africa Squadron used as a base for operations against the slave trade. Nicolls received the appointment after colonial administrator and anti-slave trade crusader William Fitzwilliam Owen had refused the post, and after merchant John Beecroft was deemed unfit for the post. Owen, however, voiced his dissatisfaction with what he viewed as Nicolls's harsh rule on the island, and Beecroft increased his influence in the area. Nicolls, in turn, attacked Beecroft for his dealings with former slavers. Nicolls's health suffered in Fernando Po and by April 1830 he had left for Ascension. When Nicolls returned to England ill, Beecroft was placed in temporary charge of the island.

Tropical illness took a toll on the Europeans at Fernando Po, where hundreds died during Nicolls's time there. Nineteen of the 34 men in Nicolls's first contingent died soon after their arrival, and only five of the original 47 Royal Marines who accompanied him to Fernando Po in 1829 survived two years of duty on the station. Nicolls, somewhat restored to health, served a second term as Superintendent of Fernando Po during 1832–1833. Despite his differences with Owen, Nicolls was just as determined to disrupt the slave trade, and equally energetic in his attempts to convince the British government to adopt a more aggressive stance. Frustrated in territorial annexation schemes, he invited the West African rulers of Bimbia, Old Calabar, Camaroon, Malimba, and the Bonny to Fernando Po to form an anti-slavery alliance. To Nicolls's disappointment, the British government ordered him to evacuate Fernando Po on 29 August 1832 and put an end to operations there. Unfinished work and efforts to provide for the welfare of liberated and displaced slave populations delayed the end of Nicolls's mandate for several months, and he did not return to England until April 1835.

During his time in control of Fernando Po, Nicolls clashed with the Portuguese authorities on the neighbouring islands of São Tomé and Príncipe regarding his refusal to return the hundreds of escaped slaves who had sought refuge on Fernando Po. In a February 1842 letter to The Times he said he was accused by the Portuguese governor, Senhor Ferreira, some of whose slaves were among the escapees, of deliberately enticing slaves to run away and of encouraging "thieves" and "murderers". This charge he denied, asserting that he had never actively encouraged slaves from nearby islands to make the dangerous crossing to Fernando Po, but that if they chose to do so, it was his duty under British law and "as a Christian man" not to return them to slavery. He considered those slaves who killed in the course of their escapes as legally and morally justified in their action, nor did he regard them as thieves for having seized canoes to escape in. He offered to return any stolen canoes, and wrote that if Ferreira could persuade any of the escapees to return voluntarily to a state of slavery, he would not impede them. He wrote to The Times during the debate which followed the Creole case, in which slaves transported aboard the American vessel Creole had taken control of her and forced the crew to take them to a British-run port.

== Later life and family ==
Nicolls retired from the Royal Marines, and was given the substantive rank of lieutenant colonel, on 15 May 1835. On 3 November 1840, he received the brevet British Army rank of colonel, postdated to 10 January 1837. He was awarded a good-service pension of £150 per annum on 30 June 1842.

On 9 November 1846, he was promoted to the brevet Army rank of major general, in June 1854, he was advanced to lieutenant general, and just a year later in June 1855 he was promoted to full general.

In July 1855, he was made Knight Commander of the Order of the Bath (KCB).

In 1809, while still a young captain of Marines, Nicolls married Miss Eleanor Bristow (1792–1880), who was also from northern Ireland. They had the following children:

- Alicia Sarah Nicolls (1810–1891), married Thomas Ashworth in 1847
- Eleanor Hester Nicolls (1811–1898), married Macgregor Laird (1808–1861) in 1837
- Edwina Anna Nicolls (1814–1902), married John Hill Williams in 1853
- Jane Mary Nicolls (1819–1901), married Royal Navy Captain Archibald Douglas William Fletcher (1821–1882)
- Elizabeth Nicolls (1821–1856), married the educator John Richard Blakiston (1829–1917) in 1854
- Lieutenant Edward Nicolls (1821–1844) of the Royal Navy, who died attempting to save a man's life while serving as first lieutenant of HMS Dwarf
- Major Richard Orpin Townsend Nicolls (1823–1862) of the Madras Staff Corps (British Indian Army)

Nicolls died at his residence in Blackheath, London on 5 February 1865. Eleanor outlived her husband by 15 years, dying on 24 November 1880 at the age of 88.

== Legacy ==
Nicolls has been described by Peter C. Smith in a history of the Royal Marines as "possibly the most distinguished officer the corps ever had." An anonymous detractor during the War of 1812 described Nicolls as an "impatient and blustering Irishman" but "apparently brave". (Note: Latour 1816 contains an anonymously authored letter, sent from Havana to Pensacola dated 8 August 1814, advising that "the Colonel is an impatient blustering Irishman, who was governor of Andant [sic]..and is apparently brave'") A similar assessment was said to have been made in 1815 by Lord Bathurst, the Secretary of State for War and the Colonies, who called him "a man of activity and spirit, but a very wild fellow." (Note: He was quoted in a letter from John Quincy Adams to James Monroe dated 19 September 1815: "Why, said Lord Bathurst, to tell you the truth, Colonel Nicholls [sic] is, I believe a man of activity and spirit, but a very wild fellow.")

Nicholls Town, in the Bahamas, is named for Nicolls. Its founders were former slaves Nicolls had helped liberate and reach British territory, where they were free.

An enslaved man called Fernando who joined Nicolls' Corps of Colonial Marines at Pensacola remained in Florida following the British withdrawal in 1816. He fought alongside Native Americans resisting United States' forces invading Florida, and in 1818 was captured by Andrew Jackson and re-enslaved. Renamed "Polydore", Fernando/Polydore would be enslaved by the Jackson family until 1865, passing into the ownership of Andrew Jackson's grandson Samuel in Louisiana. Emancipated in 1865, Fernando/Polydore is recorded in the 1870 United States census as a 100 year old "retired farm labourer" who at some point between 1865-1870 had chosen as his family's surname "Nicles".
