= Fowlstown, Georgia =

- Unincorporated community
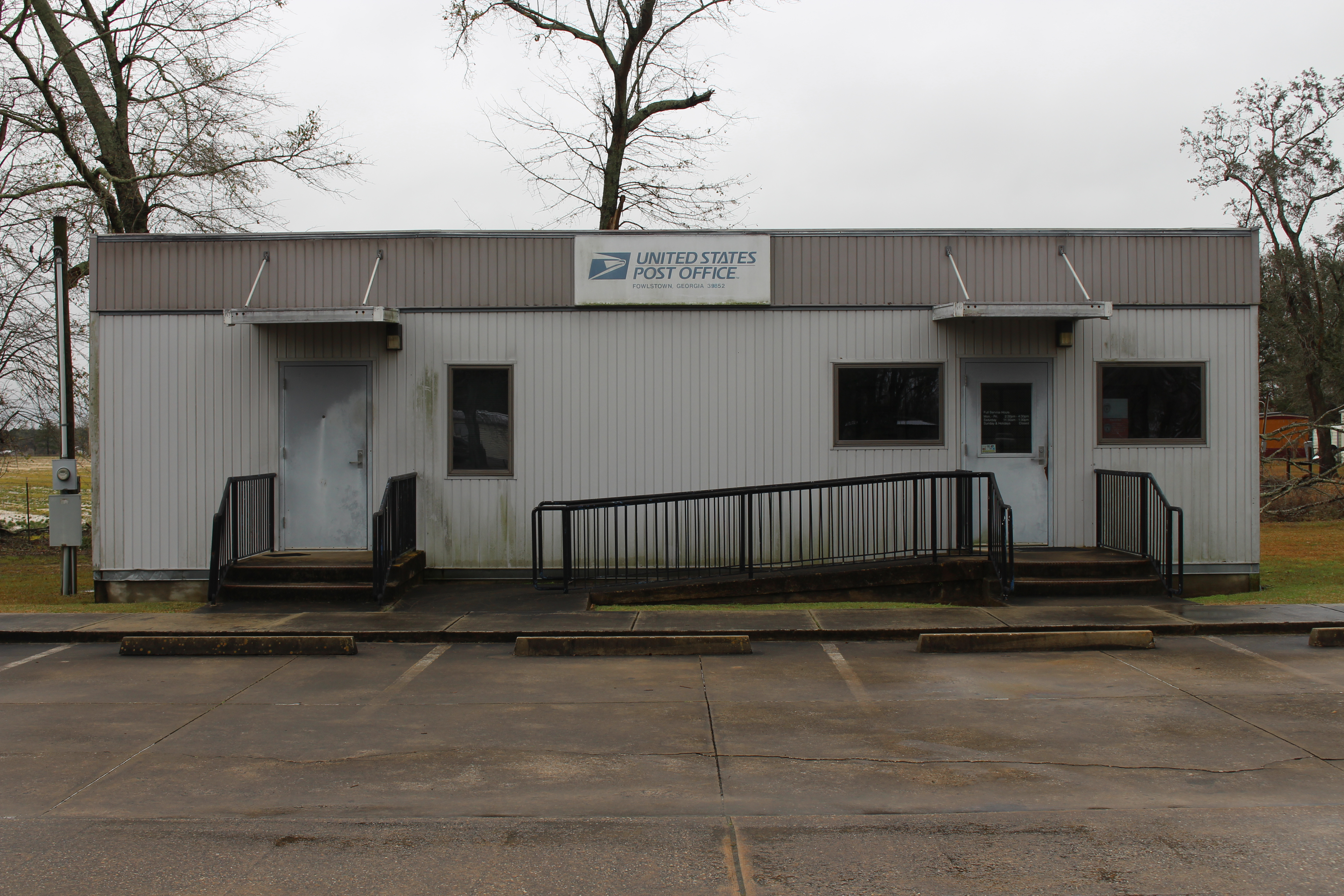
- Fowlstown Post Office

- Location within Georgia
- Coordinates: 30°48′10″N 84°32′50″W
- Country: United States
- State: Georgia
- County: Decatur
- Elevation: 292 ft (89 m)
- Time zone: UTC-5 (Eastern (EST))
  - Summer (DST): UTC-4 (EDT)
- ZIP code: 39852
- Area code: 229
- GNIS feature ID: 355902

Fowlstown is an unincorporated community in Decatur County, Georgia, United States. The community is located on Georgia State Route 309, 7.3 miles (11.7 km) south of Bainbridge. Fowlstown has a post office with ZIP code 39852, which opened on March 12, 1883. An early variant name was Kemp.

== See also ==
- Battle of Fowltown
