= HMS Nimble (1813) =

Cutter of the British Royal Navy

History

United Kingdom
- Name: HMS Nimble
- Launched: 1813
- Acquired: 5 March 1813
- Fate: Sold 18 April 1816

General characteristics
- Tons burthen: 147 (bm)
- Length: Overall:68 ft 5 in (20.9 m); Keel:50 ft 11 5/8 in (15.5 m)
- Beam: 23 ft 3 1/2 in (7.1 m)
- Depth of hold: 10 ft 2 in (3.1 m)
- Complement: 50
- Armament: 10 × 12-pounder carronades

HMS Nimble was a new cutter that the Royal Navy purchased in 1813. The Navy sold her in 1816.

== Career ==
Lieutenant Peter Williams commissioned Nimble on 5 April 1813. (He had come from the gunbrig HMS Richmond)

During the capture of San Sebastian Nimble and Constant blockaded the mouth of Bindassoa from 31 August to 8 September.

Lieutenant Josiah Thompson replaced Williams in August 1814; Williams had been appointed to the rank of Commander on 24 August.

In April–May 1815 Nimble was at the Garonne. There she boarded Young William, which was on her way Bordeaux, and warned her not to enter the river.

On 2 July 1814 the chasse-maree Aimable arrived at Falmouth. Nimble had detained and several other vessels as well.

On 2 November 1815 Nimble returned to Plymouth from Newfoundland. Thompson paid off Nimble in November 1815.

== Fate ==
The "Principal Officers and Commissioners of His Majesty's Navy" offered the "Nimble cutter, of 147 tons", lying at Sheerness, for sale on 18 April 1816. Nimble was sold to Mr. Nixon on that day.

== Postscript ==
In January 1819, the London Gazette reported that Parliament had voted a grant to all those who had served under the command of Lord Viscount Keith in 1812, between 1813 and 1814, and in the Gironde. Nimble was listed among the vessels that had served under Keith in 1813 and 1814. (Note: The money was paid in three tranches. For someone participating in the first through third tranches, a first-class share was worth £256 5s 9d; a sixth-class share, that of an ordinary seaman, was worth £4 6s 10d. For someone participating only in the second and third tranches a first-class share was worth £202 6s 8d; a sixth-class share was worth £5 0s 5d.) She had also served under Keith in the Gironde. (Note: The sum of the two tranches of payment for that service was £272 8s 5d for a first-class share; the amount for a sixth-class share was £3 3s 5d.)
