= Emulous =

British merchant ship (1817–1841)

History

United Kingdom
- Builder: Chapman & Campion, Whitby
- Launched: 31 July 1817
- Fate: Foundered May 1841

General characteristics
- Tons burthen: 225, or 226, or 228, or 230 (bm)
- Sail plan: Brig

Emulous was a merchant ship launched at Whitby in 1817. She traded widely, including to Mauritius under a licence from the British East India Company (EIC). She foundered in the North Atlantic in May 1841.

== Career ==
Emulous first appeared in Lloyd's Register (LR) in 1818.

| Year | Master | Owner | Trade | Source |
|---|---|---|---|---|
| 1818 | J.Sowell | Chapman & Co. | London–Antwerp | LR |
| 1820 | J.Sowell; Trundle | Chapman & Co. | London–Antwerp | LR |

By 1820 Emulous was sailing to the West Indies.

| Year | Master | Owner | Trade | Source |
|---|---|---|---|---|
| 1821 | Trundle | Chapman & Co. | London–Berbice | LR |
| 1822 | Trundle; Hunt | Chapman & Co. | London–Berbice; London–Quebec | LR |
| 1824 | G.Hunt | Chapman & Co. | London–Cape of Good Hope | LR |
| 1825 | G.Hunt | Chapman & Co. | London–Peterburg | LR |
| 1826 | Welbank | Chapman & Co. | London–Rio de Janeiro | LR |

In 1813 the EIC had lost its monopoly on the trade between India and Britain. British ships were then free to sail to India or the Indian Ocean under a licence from the EIC. Emulous, Welbank, master, sailed from London to Mauritius on 4 May 1826.

After the ship Ben Jonson left Madras on 8 June 1826 she encountered several gales during which she had to throw some of her cargo overboard. She started making 2½ feet of water an hour in her hold and so put into Mauritius on 22 July to repair. Her remaining cargo was forwarded on Emulous.

| Year | Master | Owner | Trade | Source & notes |
|---|---|---|---|---|
| 1828 | Welbank | Chapman & Co. | London | LR |
| 1831 | Welbank | Chapman & Co. | London–Archangel | LR |

In 1831 Emulous changed her registry to London, but Chapman & Co. remained her owners.

| Year | Master | Owner | Trade | Source & notes |
|---|---|---|---|---|
| 1832 | Welbank; J.Gale | Chapman & Co. | London | LR |
| 1834 | Welbank | Chapman & Co. | London | LR; repair topsides and bottom 1832, & new top deck and sides 1833 |
| 1837 | Welbank | Chapman & Co. | Liverpool–Quebec | LR; repair topsides and bottom 1832, new wales and deck and sides 1833, & small repairs 1837 |
| 1839 | Welbank; W.Porritt | Chapman & Co. | London–Quebec | LR; repair topsides and bottom 1832, new wales and deck and sides 1833, & small repairs 1837 |

== Fate ==
On 14 May 1841, Howard, of Liverpool, encountered the brig Emulous, of London, Gales, master, at 38°56′N 47°49′W, in a sinking state. Howard took off the crew, when Emulous immediately sank. Emulous had been on a voyage from London to Dorchester, New Brunswick. (Another account gives the date as 11 April.)

Emulous, of London, was last listed in Lloyd's Register in 1841, and was the only one of five vessels by that name whose homeport was London.
