= William Fitzwilliam Owen =

British naval officer and explorer (1774-1857)

Vice-Admiral William Fitzwilliam Owen
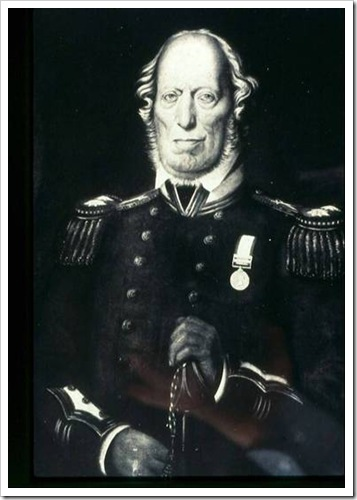
- William Fitzwilliam Owen
- Born: 17 September 1774; Manchester, England
- Died: 3 November 1857 (aged 83); Saint John, New Brunswick
- Military career
- Allegiance: United Kingdom
- Branch: Royal Navy
- Service years: 1788 - 1847
- Rank: Vice-Admiral
- Commands: HMS Nancy (1794); HMS Seaflower (1782); HMS Leven (1813)

Vice-Admiral William Fitzwilliam Owen (17 September 1774 – 3 November 1857) was a British naval officer and explorer. He is best known for his exploration of the west and east African coasts, discovery of the Seaflower Channel off the coast of Sumatra and for surveying the Canadian Great Lakes.

The illegitimate son of Captain William Owen, he was orphaned at the age of four. However, his father's friend Rear-Admiral Sir Thomas Rich, kept an eye on both William and his elder brother Edward. In 1788 at age 13 he embarked as a midshipman in Rich's ship, HMS Culloden, and from that time the Royal Navy was his life. Self-willed and boisterous, he had frequent difficulties early in his naval career.

He served at home and on ships in the East Indies. He was commissioned as a lieutenant in 1797. In 1801 he took command of the fireship HMS Nancy. In late 1801 the hired armed cutter King George, under the command of a Mr. Yawkins (William Yawkins), served under Nelson at his failed attack on Boulogne. On 25 August Nelson came aboard King George to conduct a reconnaissance of the French fleet. In October Nelson gave Owen command over the King George as well, with secret instructions to launch a burning Nancy at the French fleet. The fire attack did not occur and Nancy was sold in December.

After the resumption of war with France in 1803, Owen was given command of the 16-gun brig HMS Seaflower (1782), which sailed to the East Indies. There he served under Rear-Admiral Sir Edward Pellew, Commander-in-Chief East Indies.

He explored the Maldive Islands in 1806, and in the same year discovered the Seaflower Channel, between the islands of Siberut and Sipora off the west coast of Sumatra.

He fought the Dutch in the East Indies, but on 28 September 1808 the French frigate Manche captured Seaflower. The French held Owen from 1808 to 1810 in Mauritius, during which time he was promoted to commander. After his release Owen was promoted to post captain in May 1811, before returning to England in 1813.

From 1815 to 1816, he surveyed the Upper Canadian Great Lakes with Lieutenant Henry Wolsey Bayfield, naming an inlet in southern Georgian Bay "Owen's Sound" in honour of his elder brother, Admiral Sir Edward William Campbell Rich Owen. Between 26 October 1815 and 31 May 1816 he was the senior Royal Navy Officer on the Great Lakes.

Owen mapped the entire east African coast from the Cape to the Horn of Africa between 1821 and 1826 in the sloop Leven and in company with the brig Barracouta. During this period, Owen established a one-man protectorate of Mombasa with the aim of disrupting the "hellish trade" in slaves; but Owen was forced to shut down under orders from the Crown after only three years. When he returned in 1826, with 300 new charts, covering some 30,000 miles of coastline, over half of his original crew had been killed by tropical diseases. His survey of the east coast of Africa is regarded as one of the most challenging ever undertaken by the British Admiralty.

In 1827 he was in charge of settling a colony at Fernando Po. During the first year, he was joined by Lieutenant James Holman who was famous in his time as "the Blind Traveller".

In the mid-1830s, having little hope of further naval appointment, he removed with his family to New Brunswick. He secured title to Campobello Island, which had been granted to his father and was lord proprietor of the same as well as being involved in other investments in New Brunswick. His wife was unhappy with the move, and his daughters noted having to sleep with cats to stay warm. From 1841 he served as a justice of the peace as well as concurrently as judge of the Inferior Court of Common Pleas.

In 1837, he was involved in the incorporation of the Campobello Mill and Manufacturing Company.

Between 1837 and 1842 he was a very visible member of the New Brunswick House of Assembly for Charlotte County. Following his defeat for reelection, he was appointed in December 1843 to the New Brunswick Legislative Council of which he was an active member through 1851. He was elected an Associate Fellow of the American Academy of Arts and Sciences in 1844.

In the final action of his naval career, between September 1842 and December 1847, he conducted the definitive survey of the Bay of Fundy for the Admiralty. Indeed, some charts of the area are still based upon his surveys.

== Family ==
Vice Admiral Owen was twice married: first in January 1818 to Martha Evans with whom he had two daughters (see Captain John James Robinson-Owen), secondly 11 December 1852 in Saint John, New Brunswick to Amy (née Vernon) Nicholson widow of Captain Thomas L. Nicholson (see William Johnstone Ritchie).

Owen was promoted Rear Admiral in 1841 and Vice Admiral in 1854. He died on 3 November 1857 at St. John, New Brunswick.

== Death and legacy ==
Upon Fitzwilliam Owen's death, he was buried by candle-light in the family's tiny chapel, which was noted as "a fitting close to an eccentric life".

A species of African chameleon, Trioceros oweni, was named in his honor by British zoologist John Edward Gray in 1831.

== See also ==
- O'Byrne, William Richard (1849). "Owen, William Fitzwilliam" . A Naval Biographical Dictionary . John Murray – via Wikisource.
