= Hired armed cutter George =

His Majesty's Hired armed cutter George was a cutter that served the Royal Navy between 6 June 1798 and 12 November 1801 under contract. She had a burthen of 125 34/94 tons (bm), and was armed two 6-pounder guns and twelve 12-pounder carronades. She captured one French privateer. During the Napoleonic Wars the French captured her and she served the French Navy until September 1813; she was struck from the French Navy's lists ca. 1816.

Hired armed cutter

She was under the command of Lieutenant Charles Patey when on 18 November 1798 she captured the French privateer lugger Enterprise, off Alderney after a chase of four hours. Enterprise mounted two swivel guns, and had a crew of 16 men under the command of Jacques Adam, master, all well supplied with small arms. Enterprise was two days out of Granville and had not captured anything.

On 2 March 1799, George, under the command of Lieutenant George Hayes, sailed from Plymouth with a convoy for Guernsey. for Guernsey.

In early 1800 George sailed between the Channel Islands and England, convoying vessels. Then on 1 April 1800 George arrived at Plymouth badly damaged from an engagement with a French lugger. George, of twelve 4-pounder guns and 45 men, had encountered the French lugger off the Gaskets. The lugger was armed with eighteen 6-pounders and had a large crew, but George brought her to action, an engagement that lasted an hour. The lugger attempted several times to run into George to permit boarding, but failed. The lugger then left. George had suffered two men killed and four wounded.

In May 1801 Hayes petitioned the House of Lords to be excused from attending the second hearing on a bill authorizing his divorce from his wife for adultery. Hayes explained that he commanded the cutter George, based at Yarmouth, and that he was under orders to take his cutter and several vessels under his command later that month to the coast of Holland for a month on a "particular service" that he was not at liberty to detail. He argued that compelling his attendance would impose "great injury and Inconvenience to His Majesty's service".

Napoleonic Wars

The French captured George ca. August 1803. French records report that George was built ca. 1781, and had a displacement of 130 tons (French). In French service she was armed with ten 4-pounder guns.

The French Navy initially commissioned her on 6 September 1803 as Transport No.714 (Georges). From 1806 she was listed as a combatant vessel under the name Georges, though she may have reverted to that role earlier. On 1 September 1805 the cutter Georges was at Calais, and under the command of enseigne de vaisseau Drinot. She was declared unserviceable in September 1813 at Dunkirk, and struck from the lists around 1816.
