= Battle of Ocheesee =

Battle during Seminole Wars, Florida, US

- Part of Seminole Wars
Date	December 15, 1817–mid-March, 1818
Location	Apalachicola River, between Calhoun and Franklin County, Florida 30°58′N 89°56′W
Status	Military supply convoy immobilized for three months

Belligerents
Red Stick Creeks	United States

Commanders and leaders
Neamathla	Andrew Jackson

The Battle of Ocheesee took place on a bluff overlooking the Apalachicola River, in northwest Spanish Florida, beginning in December of 1817. The shooting part of the battle lasted almost a week, but the engagement lasted "weeks" and was "the longest sustained engagement of the Seminole Wars". The name comes from the bluffs that overlook the river, from which one party of marksmen waged their attack. Today the land is in Torreya State Park.

On December 15, 1817, Red Stick Creek Indians fired from both sides of the river simultaneously on ships carrying supplies upriver to Fort Gaines, Fort Scott, and Fort Hughes, the latter of which was simultaneously attacked. The convoy was halted because the sailors could not show themselves to continue navigation. With the convoy halted, the troops at Fort Scott were at risk of starvation, on half-rations for "a long time". Fort Hughes was abandoned. In effect, Fort Scott and Fort Gaines were under siege.

The underlying issue was ownership of land south of the Flint River, which the other faction of the Creeks (who had just had a civil war) had ceded to the United States in the Treaty of Fort Jackson. The Red Sticks were not a party to the treaty (they were not even notified), and claimed that those Creeks had no right to give away their land. Behind it was the Treaty of Ghent ending the War of 1812, which guaranteed return to the Creeks of the lands taken from them by the United States. The treaty was, in this regard, unenforceable, since the British were scarcely going to send out troops to guarantee Indian rights.

There is not a definite day for the conclusion of the battle. The vessels were still pinned down in the same place when General Andrew Jackson took additional troops from Fort Scott into Spanish Florida on March 11, 1818, reaching Prospect Bluff on March 16, 1818. During this time, the Indians having withdrawn, the supply convoy was set free. To prevent future such problems, Jackson had Fort Gadsden built within the walls of the former British, then Negro Fort. This was a U.S. fort built in Spanish Florida.
