= Nicolls' Outpost =

Fort built by British Lt. Col. Edward Nicolls

- Nicolls' Outpost, within the Chattahoochee Landing Site (8GD4)
- U.S. National Register of Historic Places
- U.S. National Historic Landmark
- Nicolls Outpost historical marker, Chattahoochee, Florida
- Location: Chattahoochee, Florida, U.S.
- Nearest city: Tallahassee
- Coordinates: 30.7006°N 84.8568°W
- Built: 1814
- NRHP reference No.: 83004702

Significant dates
- Added to NRHP: 1983
- Designated NHL: 1983

Nicolls' Outpost was the smaller and more northern of two forts built by British Lt. Col. Edward Nicolls during the War of 1812. (The Americans referred to it as Fort Apalachicola.) The 1815 end of the War of 1812 aborted this project. It was built in 1814 and abandoned early in 1815, at the end of the war.

== Construction ==
Following a November council of war with his warrior allies, Nicolls decided to proceed with the construction of two forts, at their urging. (Note: My intention now is to throw up strong works at the Bluff. I have written for cannon and stores...[The Indian chiefs] entreat me to build two forts... If you take us away [on campaign] you ought to have a protection for our wives and children.) Built at the end of 1814, together with the larger "British post" or storage depot down the Apalachicola, it was the northernmost post built by the British during their Gulf Coast Campaign. It was just below the Spanish Florida–Georgia border, where the Flint and Chattahoochee Rivers meet to form the Apalachicola, in River Landing Park in modern Chattahoochee, Florida. Even though what was built was smaller than the much larger British post eighty miles to the south, further down the Apalachicola, Cox notes "it was the operational base from which attacks into Georgia were to be made."

It was built atop the largest of three surviving mounds of the prehistoric Fort Walton culture, situated above the winter flood stage of the Apalachicola. It could reach both forks of the river with cannon fire. It was armed with a 5 1/2-inch howitzer. It also had a coehorn, a mortar that could fire 24-pound shells.

The start of 1815 was to have seen a British offensive in the south, with the Royal Marine Battalions to advance westward into Georgia, to be joined by Nicolls and his forces from the Gulf Coast. (Note: 'Intended route of operations by the Detachment and Indians under Major Nicolls' dated January 6, 1815, from Nicolls to Cochrane) This is outlined in correspondence from Vice Admiral Cochrane to Major General John Lambert.

On February 20, 1815, according to a report of U.S. Colonel and Indian agent Benjamin Hawkins, he had observed at the outpost "Nicolls with 200 troops, white and black and an assemblage of 500 [Creek] Warriors". The intention of Hawkins was to mount an expedition "up the river" (the Flint), bringing the cannon along. Georgia militia, other U.S. forces, and the faction of the Creek allied with the U.S. (the Lower Creeks) were preparing upriver (in Georgia) for a battle. Hawkins was at Tocktoethla, which he dubbed "115 Mile Camp", this being the distance downstream of Fort Mitchell, Alabama. Thomas Perryman and his tribe retreated from here to the safety of Nicolls' Outpost. News of the treaty ending the war (Treaty of Ghent), which reached both sides in February 1815, prevented the battle from taking place. Hawkins learned of the peace on February 25, 1815.

These plans of the British were overtaken by events, as peace was declared following the conclusion of the Treaty of Ghent. With the offensive cancelled, Nicolls and his men returned to Prospect Bluff at the end of March. The artillery was removed from the outpost, and transported back to Prospect Bluff that month. In April, Capitano Pintado was advised by Nicolls that the outpost's garrison had been reduced to a handful of men. The British abandoned both of its forts on the Apalachicola, leaving them in the hands of the discharged black men formerly of the Corps of Colonial Marines that Nicolls had trained, and of Red Stick Creek Neamathla and his warriors.

The end of armed conflict was replaced with a war of words between Nicolls and Hawkins. From February through June 1815 Nicolls engaged in a heated exchange of letters (Note: Sent by Nicolls on February 28, April 28, May 12 and June 12, 1815) with Hawkins as U.S. Indian Agent. (Note: Hawkins responded on March 19 and 24, May 24 and 28) Hawkins accused Nicolls of being overzealous and of overstepping his authority in his personal defense of Redstick Creeks, Seminoles, and their maroon Creole allies, whom some Americans in authority viewed as nothing more than runaway slaves, lost or unclaimed property.

== Council of 1815 ==
Before abandoning the Fort, an important council (meeting) took place there on March 10, 1815. The meeting was between Red Stick Creek leaders Neamathla, Francis the Prophet (Josiah Francis), Peter McQueen, and more than 30 other indigenous people, and Lt. Col. Nicolls and four other British officers, passing through on their way to British ships to return them to other British colonies (Bahamas, Jamaica, Trinidad) or to England. "The council included representatives from towns or groups of Lower Creeks, Red Sticks, Miccosukee, Alachua, Yuchi and Choctaw. Languages spoken included Hitchiti, Yuchi, and Choctaw. In short, a wide range of cultures was combining into the group that we know today as Seminoles." In retrospect, this was the founding of the Seminoles, a loose alliance of various groups of indigenous refugees in Spanish Florida, although they did not set up a central authority, which was "extremely difficult for the United States military to understand. ... The political and social complications at play in the developing Seminole Nation were utterly incomprehensible to American settlers and officials." The person who did understand them, Indian agent Hawkins, died in 1816.

The Treaty of Ghent stated that indigenous peoples were to be restored "all possessions, rights and privileges which they may have enjoyed, or been entitled to in 1811". The meeting was to point out to the British that having assisting them, the Creeks faced even greater hostility from the Americans. They claimed to be subjects of Britain, and asked British assistance in recovering their lands.

== Treaty of Nicolls' Outpost ==
The most important outcome of the meeting was the little-known Treaty of Nicolls' Outpost. In it, the Creeks promised allegiance to Great Britain, which in turn accepted them as subjects of the British empire. The hope was that Britain would provide them with protection against the United States, so they could recover the land taken since 1811, more specifically that taken in the Treaty of Fort Jackson, which they, the Red Stick Creeks, had not signed and which, they claimed, did not apply to them. Nicolls, a champion of indigenous rights, created this treaty on his own initiative, without authorization.

The outcome was the famous trip of Francis the Prophet to London, together with Nicolls, to seek recognition and assistance from Great Britain. The British government, in no way interested in further conflict with the United States, summarily rejected the Treaty, sent Francis home, and chastised Nicolls.

== Historical marker ==
A historical marker has been erected at the site:

Atop this large prehistoric mound stood Nicolls' Outpost, a British fort of the War of 1812. Built in the fall of 1814, it was a rectangular earthen redoubt with a surrounding stockade and was armed with two small cannons. Garrisoned by 180 white and black Royal Colonial Marines, the outpost was named for Bvt. Lt. Col. Edward Nicolls, a noted British officer of the early 19th century. Nicolls was assigned the task of forming a battalion of Royal Colonial Marines by enlisting and training both free blacks and liberated slaves from Spanish Florida and the United States. He was also ordered to supply a large fighting force of Red Stick Creek and Seminole Indians. The outpost provided protection for Nicolls' main base at today's Fort Gadsden Historic Site in the Apalachicola National Forest. It was to serve as a launching point for a planned invasion of Georgia and more than 500 Creek and Seminole Indians gathered here in February 1815. They were preparing to attack when news arrived of the end of the War of 1812. A major council of chiefs met here in March to appeal for continued British support, but Nicolls' Outpost was abandoned soon after.

== See also ==
- Prospect Bluff Historic Sites

== Bibliography ==
- Cox, Dale (2016). Fort Scott, Fort Hughes & Camp Recovery. Three 19th century military sites in Southwest Georgia. Old Kitchen Books. p. 65. ISBN 979-8362183813.
- Cox, Dale; Conrad, Rachael (2017). Fowltown: Neamathla, Tutalosi Talofa and the first battle of the Seminole Wars. Old Kitchen Books. ISBN 978-0692977880.
- Cox, Dale (November 15, 2022). Nicolls' outpost : a War of 1812 fort at Chattahoochee, Florida (Hardcover ed.). Old Kitchen Books. ISBN 979-8362183813.
- Hughes, Christine F.; Brodine, Charles E., eds. (2023). The Naval War of 1812: A Documentary History, Vol. 4. Washington: Naval Historical Center (GPO). ISBN 978-1-943604-36-4.
- McReynolds, Edwin C. (1972) [1957]. The Seminoles. Norman, Oklahoma: University of Oklahoma Press. ISBN 978-0-8061-1255-8.
- Millett, Nathaniel (2013). The Maroons of Prospect Bluff and Their Quest for Freedom in the Atlantic World. University Press of Florida. ISBN 9780813044545 – via Project MUSE.
- Owsley, Frank L. Jr. (1981). Struggle for the Gulf Borderlands: The Creek War and the Battle of New Orleans, 1812–1815. Gainesville: University Press of Florida. ISBN 978-0-8173-1062-2.
