= HMS Seaflower =

Four vessels of the Royal Navy have been named HMS Seaflower:

- HMS Seaflower (1782) was a 16-gun brig-sloop purchased in April 1782 that the French frigate Manche, under Jean Dornal de Guy, captured near Bencoolen on 29 September 1808.
- HMS Seaflower was a 16-gun brig-sloop listed in 1809, and sold on 1 September 1814.
- HMS Seaflower (1830) was a 4 gun cutter launched at Portsmouth Dockyard on 20 May 1830 and broken up at Charlton, scrapping completed on 8 October 1866.
- HMS Seaflower (1873) was an 8 gun training brig, launched at Pembroke Dockyard on 25 February 1873. Converted to a floating workshop in January 1904, the ship was sold at Charlton on 7 April 1908.
