= Mateo González Manrique =

Spanish Army officer

Governor of West Florida
- In office 1813–1815
- Preceded by: Mauricio de Zúñiga
- Succeeded by: José de Soto

Personal details
- Born: 1745 Ubaté, modern day Colombia
- Died: 1815? Florida?
- Spouse: Ceferina Martorell Valdés
- Profession: Army officer, colonial administrator

Military service
- Allegiance: Spain
- Branch/service: Spanish Army
- Commands: Spanish Florida

Mateo González Manrique (1745 – c. 1815) was a Spanish Army officer and colonial administrator who served as the governor of West Florida from 1813 to 1815. During his tenure as governor, Spanish Florida was caught in the War of 1812 between the United States and Britain. Manrique attempted to remain neutral in the conflict despite the small garrison at his disposal. In an attempt to counterbalance US expansion, he invited British forces to garrison Pensacola in the hopes that this would dissuade an American attack. In 1814, American forces under Andrew Jackson attacked Pensacola, with the British forces in the city blowing up a fort before withdrawing. Following the battle, Jackson returned control of Pensacola to the Spanish. Manrique was succeeded as governor by José de Soto in 1815, and possibly died in the same year.

== Career ==
Manrique was a commissioned officer of the Spanish army, starting his career in 1765 with the regimiento de infantería Saboya, rising to the Field ranks of teniente coronel capitán in 1799, and then Sargento mayor in August 1803. On May 5, 1813, Manrique was appointed governor of Spanish West Florida, reporting to Juan Ruiz de Apodaca the Captain General of Cuba and Florida. He held this post until March 31, 1815. Manrique was succeeded by José de Soto as governor of West Florida.

=== Escalation of the Creek War ===
By 1812 the war against Napoleon and the revolts in South America had resulted in the Spanish position on the Gulf Coast deteriorating to a point of total weakness. Luis de Onís objected to any efforts to defend Florida, either by Spanish action or by alliances with the Indians, or even with British military help. He believed that Spain could only retain Florida through diplomacy, as opposed to of military force. In spring 1813, an attack on Pensacola by the Americans was anticipated by Zuniga, and Apodaca wanted it defended. Given their suspicions about the British, allying with the Indians was the only possibility left to the Spanish to defend Florida.

The Creek indians believed they would be supported by the British and the Spanish, and they would be given warlike stores at Pensacola. Manrique's predecessor Zuniga had invited the Creeks to Pensacola. It is likely the invitation was to discuss future plans. They were not in a position to provide aid for an immediate escalation. It was with these expectations that a party of 60 Creeks traveled to Pensacola in May 1813. This first party was dismissed, and went away empty handed.

After their departure, Manrique came to the same conclusion as his predecessor, the Americans would attack Pensacola in the very near future, and Indian support represented the only plausible Spanish defense. He sought Apodaca's approval, along with requesting supplies for his garrison and the Indians. Before a response was forthcoming from Havana, a second party of approximately 300 Indians arrived in Pensacola.

In July 1813, Peter McQueen, a Métis and Creek chief, prophet, trader and warrior from Talisi, decided to broaden the war against the Americans over their frequent incursions on Creek lands. McQueen demanded that Manrique supply him with ammunition, and warned that he would burn Pensacola to the ground if the governor did not cooperate. This was to lead to an ultimatum, to support the Red Sticks and to break relations with the Americans. McQueen's warriors were unruly, and at one point Manrique used his troops to face down some impatient Creeks.Manrique was able to provide gunpowder and food, but no weapons. Manrique informed his superiors of the intention of McQueen and the Red Sticks to broaden the war against the Americans, seeking approval to arm the Indians. The response was that Manrique should provide all the arms and supplies that he could spare, none of which were forthcoming from Havana or Cadiz. Neither the Spanish nor the British had been able or willing to supply the Creeks in 1813, notwithstanding American suspicions.

Upon leaving Florida, McQueen's party were ambushed, the engagement has since become known as the Battle of Burnt Corn. This was one of the first clashes between the Red Sticks and United States forces, as the intensity of the conflict escalated. After the Battle of Burnt Corn, U.S. Secretary of War John Armstrong notified General Thomas Pinckney, Commander of the 6th Military District, that the U.S. was prepared to take action against the Creek Confederacy. Furthermore, if Spain were found to be supporting the Creeks, an assault on Pensacola would ensue.

Although Jackson's mission in the fall of 1813 was to defeat the Creek, his larger objective was to move on Pensacola. (Note: Mahon notes Jackson's desire to attack Pensacola in 1813, with reference to Marquis James, also with reference to Jackson's letter to Leroy Pope dated October 31, 1813 stating his aims are to penultimately defeat the Creeks, and to conclude in striking 'at the root of the disease' by seizing Pensacola) Jackson's plan was to move south, build roads, destroy Upper Creek towns, and then later proceed to Mobile to stage an attack on Spanish-held Pensacola. He had two problems: logistics and short enlistments. When Jackson began his advance, the Tennessee River was low, making it difficult to move supplies, and there was little forage for his horses.

At this time there were only about 500 Spanish troops in West Florida. Substantial reinforcements would not be forthcoming from mainland Spain, engaged in combat against Napoleon. One way of countering the American threat could be to arm and provision the Indians, so as to bolster the weak Spanish defences.

=== Woodbine's military mission in May 1814 ===
Captain Woodbine of the Royal Marines made contact with Indians. After a meeting of various elders held aboard HMS Orpheus (1809) on May 20, weapons and other gifts were provided by the British. Woodbine was appointed as British Agent to the Creek Nations. He was advised to respect the Spanish, and to communicate this to the Creeks. (Note: 'You are most particularly enjoined on no account whatsoever to give offence to the Spaniards in East or West Florida, but advice[sic] the Chiefs to this effect') A declaration from the Chiefs of the Creek Nation to Cochrane alluded to this. The presence of the Orpheus in the Apalachicola was reported to Generals Flournoy and Jackson in June.

Upon receiving reports that the British to land on Spanish soil to arm natives at war with the United States, and Manrique had not intervened, Jackson's letter to Manrique dated July 12 warned of "disagreeable consequences" if this intelligence was true. Manrique's response dated July 26 referred to the site of the landing as being in the territory of the Indians, not the Spanish. Regarding the extradition of the two chiefs - McQueen and Francis the Prophet - to the Americans, whose presence in Florida was denied, he deplored the hypocrisy with which Spanish fugitives had been allowed to roam free by the Americans. He was critical that Baratarian pirates led by Jean Lafitte were undertaking their operations from American soil, and had not been apprehended by the authorities, resulting in losses to Spanish citizens.

Manrique was in a precarious situation. Whilst too weak to confront the Americans, he did not want to antagonise the Americans, and to maintain the remaining goodwill. Yet, at the same time, did not want to weaken his position by cutting connections with his Creek allies. He appealed for assistance to his superior in Havana, but none was forthcoming. He reported to Apodaca that he would not be able to prevent the British from landing. He took the initiative, and in August 1814 approached the British, inviting them to Pensacola. This was a radical change from the existing policy of holding small populated enclaves with the meager garrison, and avoiding confrontation with either the Americans or the British.

It has been theorized that Manrique was anticipating a substantial British force would be deployed to the Gulf Coast, to which Woodbine and Nicolls were a prelude. The evidence indicates this was promised to him by Nicolls. Rumors were circulating in Pensacola that this would be taking place. The newspapers in Havana were reporting that 25,000 soldiers of Wellington's peninsular army had allegedly arrived in Bermuda in August.

It became apparent that the Americans would be prepared to attack Pensacola. Jackson would force the issue, being well aware of Manrique's position of weakness. In his letter dated August 24, Jackson criticized Manrique for allowing British agents to operate in Pensacola and warned him that he would consider him personally responsible for any depredations suffered by American citizens.

=== Nicolls's military mission in August 1814 ===
At Bermuda, on July 4, 1814, Carron and Hermes embarked a company-strength force of Royal Marines, commanded by Edward Nicolls, for deployment on the Gulf Coast. When the British stopped at Havana on August 4, prior to sailing to the Florida coast, they made contact with Apodaca, the Captain General of Cuba and Florida. An anonymous letter sent from Havana, authored by American merchant and vice-consul Vincent Gray, which found its way into the hands of the Governor of Louisiana William C. C. Claiborne, mentioned that permission to land in Pensacola had been denied to the British. (Note: The letter mentions that the British sought permission 'to land at Pensacola, all of which were refused by the captaln-general. However, I learn that they are determined to land at Pensacola with or without leave, where they will disembark their park of artillery'.) On August 5 Hermes, with Carron accompanying, departed from Havana. They arrived at the mouth of the Apalachicola River eight days later, on August 13, 1814. From August 13 through August 21, Hermes was in the river. A vessel arrived from Pensacola, having been hired by Captain Woodbine, to transfer warlike stores from Prospect Bluff to Pensacola, with the tacit approval of Manrique. When Nicolls arrived at Prospect Bluff in August with 300 British uniforms and 1000 muskets, Manrique, fully aware of the threat the Americans posed to Florida, requested the redeployment of British forces to Pensacola. (Note: Captain Percy to Admiral Cochrane: 'I assented to re-embark the marines and proceed to that place; acquainting him [Nicolls] at the same time with my firm determination, in the event of not receiving a request from the Governor to land them, immediately to return to the anchorage off the Apalachicola, as I had promised the Captain-General, at the Havannah, not to land on Spanish territory without being requested to do so.' 'On the 21st August I left Apalachicola, and arrived at this anchorage on the 23rd; having fallen in with, off the bar, and brought with me sloop HMS Sophie. I fortunately found that a letter from the governor had been sent to me, requiring the naval force might be brought down, as he was threatened with an attack by the Americans: on the next morning I waited on the governor, when he requested me to disembark the detachment, ammunition, &c. which I immediately complied with. The fort San Miguel, the only one near the town, was put into the hands of Lieutenant-Colonel Nicolls; and the British colours were hoisted in conjunction with the Spanish, which he informed me was done with the governor's approbation.') During this time, HMS Sophie arrived at Prospect Bluff, her commander, Lockyer, was met by Major Nicolls Woodbine decided to remain at Pensacola, but dispatched Lockyer to Apalachicola with orders to return with all the remaining arms and a request for all British forces arriving there to join him at Pensacola.

Correspondence from Nicolls to Cochrane advised that upon Woodbine's arrival at Pensacola, 'he was received by the Spanish Governor in the greatest terms of friendship, and solicited by the Governor for his assistance in protecting the town of Pensacola from the immediate attack of the Americans'. Notwithstanding the rosy picture presented by Nicolls, relations between Nicolls and Manrique became strained in the following months.

The British were observed docking the 25th and unloading the 26th. At Pensacola on August 26, 1814, Nicolls issued an order of the day for the 'First Colonial battalion of the Royal Corps of Marines', and at the same time issued a widely disseminated proclamation to the people of Louisiana, urging them to join forces with the British and Indian allies against the American government. Both proclamations were reproduced in Niles' Register of Baltimore. These were a ruse as to the real strength of the British. The "numerous British and Spanish squadron of ships and vessels of war" he described comprised two sixth-rates and two sloops of the Royal Navy (Hermes, Carron, Sophie, Childers), the "good train of artillery" comprised three cannon and twelve gunners, whilst the "battalion" was a company-strength group of 100 Royal Marines infantry, detached from Major George Lewis's battalion.

Nicolls trained and equipped Creek refugees. The British had armed and recruited 500 Indians and 100 blacks as of September 10.

Nicolls set out from Pensacola, for a demonstration of force, in attacking Fort Bowyer near Mobile. (This was Spanish territory that been annexed by United States General James Wilkinson in 1813 just prior to Manrique's tenure.) The attack was a failure, resulting in a loss of face. This defeat sowed seeds of doubt and made Manrique consider whether the British were able to defend Pensacola. One disruptive element of the British presence was that slaves could flee their masters, to join Nicolls. Over 100 slaves in Pensacola alone took up this opportunity. The looting of the Forbes Company store at Bon Secour was another manifestation that the rights of property ownership of Spanish nationals were not being upheld. Robert Henry, Nicolls's artillery officer, went on record as stating that at Bon Secour he was joined by 'ten Black Men who volunteered their services.'

Common knowledge of tensions between Manrique and Nicolls were referred to in a communication from Jackson to James Monroe dated October 10. In the prelude to the attack on Pensacola, this division made any concerted effort impossible. Manrique had no desire to antagonize Jackson, the British wanted a more aggressive approach. To this end, Manrique sought to retain control of the defense of Pensacola. In this power struggle, the British threatened to withdraw their forces unless both the harbor and Fort San Carlos were placed under the joint control of Nicolls and Manrique. Protesting his neutrality, Manrique retorted that it was not in the power of the Governor to declare war, as Gordon wryly noted in his correspondence with Cochrane.

=== Pensacola attacked by Jackson ===
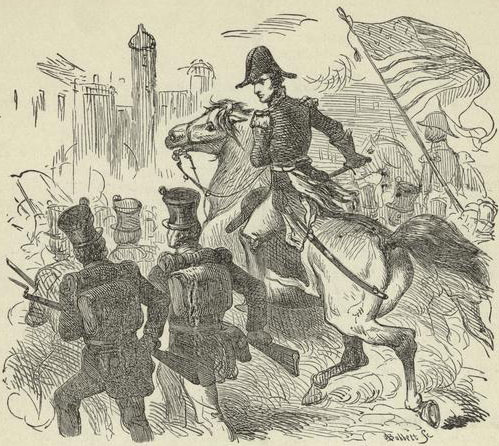
Jackson and his soldiers entering into Pensacola on November 6, 1814.

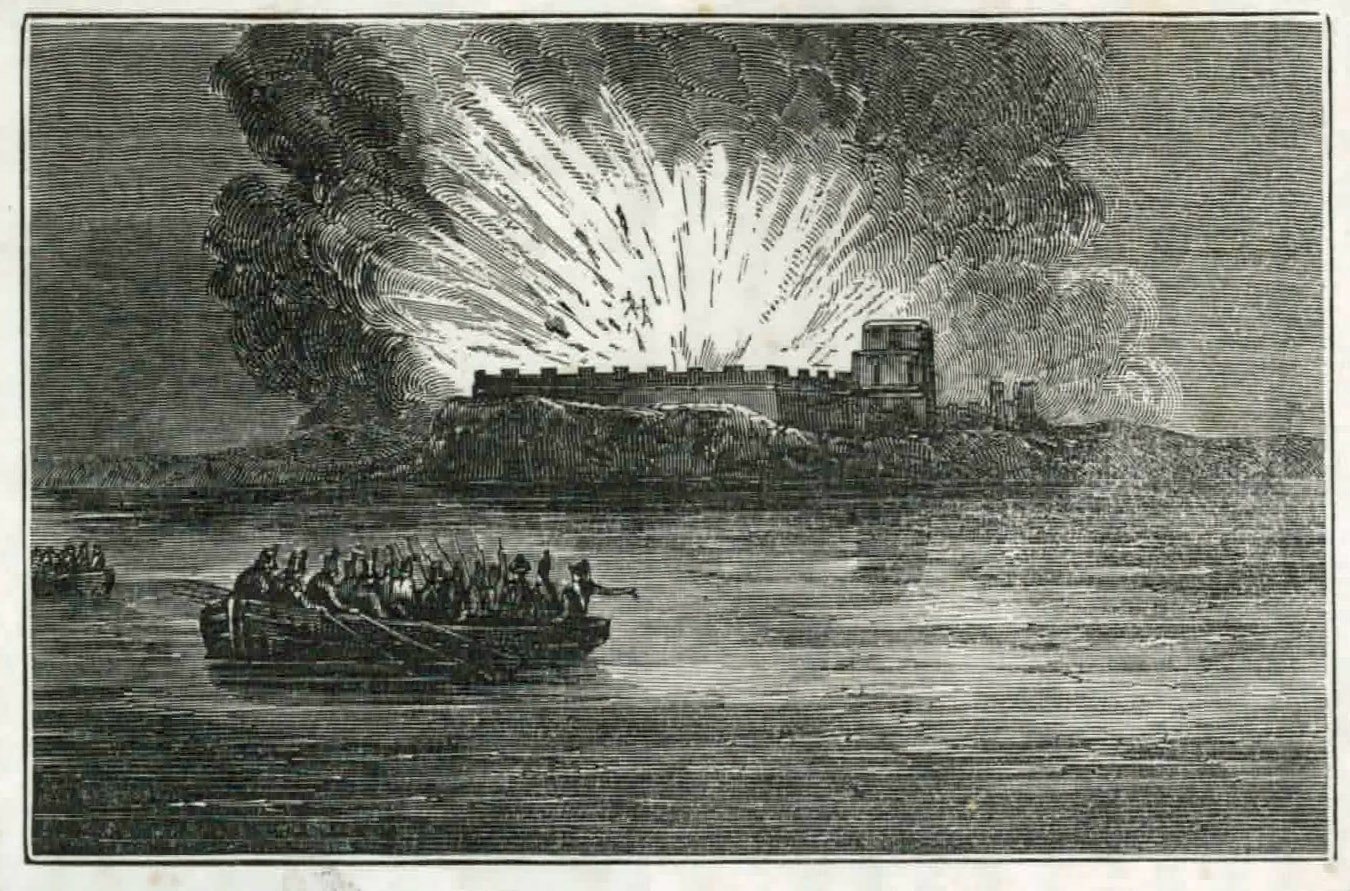
Destruction of Fort Barrancas in Pensacola by the British and their escape

In a letter to Manrique dated September 9, Jackson expressed his consternation that the British flag was flown at Pensacola when Florida was 'under the most strict plea of neutrality'.

Jackson hinted in his letter to Monroe dated September 5 that the seizure of Pensacola, and its subsequent occupation by an American garrison, in concert with Fort Bowyer at Mobile and a fort on Appalachicola would secure the area. In response, Monroe's letter to Jackson dated October 21 requests that the matter of Pensacola is not to be addressed by an attack by Jackson, but by diplomatic means, and that instead he is to prepare for the anticipated arrival of a British task force in Louisiana. (Note: 'I hasten to communicate to you, the directions of the President, that you should at present take no measures, which would involve this Government in a contest with Spain. ... it is deemed more proper, that a representation of the insolent and unjustifiable conduct of the Governor of Pensacola, should be made to that Government thro' the Ordinary channels of communication than that you should resent it by an attack on Pensacola.') Before this instruction arrived, Jackson wrote a letter to Monroe, dated October 26, explaining he was going to make an attack, and his rationale for so doing.

On November 6, Jackson first sent Major Henri Piere as a messenger under a white flag of truce, to deliver an ultimatum: to grant Jackson 'possession of the Barancas and other Fortifications with their munitions of war'. However, the messenger approached the city and was fired upon by the garrison. That night, under cover of darkness, Jackson then sent a second messenger, this time a recently captured Spanish Non-commissioned officer of the Pensacola garrison. Manrique, calling Jackson's bluff, rejected the proposal, 'I am resolved to repel by force the attempt you may make'. A subsequent communication from Jackson protested against his officer being fired upon, whilst carrying a flag of truce, and requesting acceptance of the ultimatum to be received by 6am on November 7. Manrique responded that his duty did not permit him to agree to the ultimatum, to surrender the fortifications to Jackson. Manrique was at pains to emphasize there was no longer a British presence in Pensacola. He recounted that the British had requested possession of the fortifications, which he refused them. He protested that he never tried to violate the neutrality existing between Spain and the United States.

Fort San Miguel and the garrison numbering 268 troops surrendered on November 7. Under the terms of the surrender, Jackson's troops would occupy the fort until such time as a relieving force dispatched from Spain were to arrive, thereby denying the British from further violating the neutrality of the Spanish. Fort San Carlos, which lay 14 miles to the west, remained in British hands. Jackson planned to capture the fort by storming the next day, but it was blown up and abandoned before Jackson could move on it. The British withdrew from Fort San Carlos, along with the British squadron. Jackson's letter to Manrique dated November 9 expresses his disappointment that the British blew up Fort San Carlos, in breach of what was promised, and as such he was no longer prepared to aid him with protecting Spanish neutrality with American troops. Jackson's letter to Monroe dated November 14 provides a status update relative to his 'intended movement against Pensacola.' He mentions the destruction caused as 'the British and Spanish were blowing up the works.' Acknowledging that his attack was 'Not having the Sanction of my Government,' he decided against neither repairing Fort San Miguel, nor occupying it with an American garrison, but to withdraw his troops in order to protect the frontier. Whilst in Pensacola, Jackson received confirmation a week later of a British task force in Jamaica, destined for New Orleans, so he marched to Mobile, arriving there on November 19.

The capture and brief occupation of Pensacola had the advantage of alienating the British from the Spanish, and conversely endearing the Americans to them, according to Jackson, and one account from a Pensacola resident to his brother.

=== Restitution of Spanish property ===
The capture of Pensacola forced Nicolls to retreat to the Apalachicola River. There, Nicolls regrouped at Prospect Bluff, and rallied Indians and refugee ex-slaves. Upon leaving Fort San Carlos on November 9, Nicolls took with him a large proportion of the Spanish garrison, 363 embarked supernumeraries, including 56 Pardos from Cuba, who did not return to Pensacola until 1815.

Manrique complained to Cochrane about the slaves taken from Pensacola by Nicolls. Cochrane replied on December 5, promising that he would command Nicolls to return all slaves taken from Pensacola. He informed Nicolls that a Spanish deputation would be arriving at Prospect Bluff. Lt. José Urcullo arrived at Prospect Bluff on December 27. He was sent by Manrique to recover the "slaves whence the English carried oft", according to the orders he received 10 days previously. Nicolls was away, so Captain Robert Henry, as deputy received him. He stalled Urcullo. Although 133 persons were assembled, they were advised that only those who "voluntarily choose to embark" would be returned. On January 12, a dejected Urcullo, accompanied by only ten slaves, returned back to Pensacola to inform the governor that his mission had failed. Henry wrote to Manrique the same day, explaining that, in the absence of Nicolls, he could not adequately determine who had come from Pensacola.

Manrique protested to Admiral Alexander Cochrane on January 25. He sought not only the runaway Spanish slaves, but also the return of the soldiers. Cochrane responded on February 10, aboard HMS Tonnant, off Mobile. (Note: Cochrane's letter to Manrique, composed on the Tonnant, off Mobile February 10, 1815 does state: 'Sorry that it has not been in my power to bring back the Spanish Soldiers from that vicinity ...., but in a few days I will dedicate a Sloop of War Solely to that purpose' The original transcript is stored within: Letters from Commander-in-Chief, North America: 1815, nos. 1–126 (ADM 1/508)) (Note: Letter from Admiral Cochrane to Admiral Malcolm composed on the Tonnant, off Mobile February 17, 1815 'The Spanish Governor at Pensacola, having requested that a part of the Spanish Troops removed to the Bluff, when the American Army attacked ...you will send a troop ship to Appalachicola to receive them on board, and land them in the harbour of Pensacola'. Archive reference ADM 1/508 folios 556–561, which has been reproduced in its entirety in a secondary source.)

Regarding the runaway Spanish slaves, he wrote a covering letter to Cochrane on March 9, attached to 'a representation from the Inhabitants of Pensacola respecting their losses'. Writing from HMS Royal Oak, off Mobile Bay, on March 15, 1815, Rear Admiral Pulteney Malcolm, Cochrane's subordinate commander of the Mobile Squadron, assured Manrique that Post-Captain Robert Cavendish Spencer (a son of George Spencer, 2nd Earl Spencer) of HMS Carron, had been detailed to conduct a strict enquiry into the conduct of Nicolls and Woodbine, regarding the property losses of Spanish inhabitants of Florida. Malcolm believed that in cases where formerly enslaved persons could not be persuaded to return to their owners, the British government would undertake to remunerate the owners.

Vicente Sebastián Pintado traveled to Prospect Bluff, arriving there on April 7, Spencer having arrived earlier. (Note: Enclosure 8 to Erving. Memorandum of a gentleman of respectability at Bermuda, dated 21 May 1815 "Admiral Cochrane, however, appears to have disapproved of Nicholls's conduct in affording protection to the Spanish slaves, and had sent the Hon. Captain Spencer to Pensacola for the purpose of making arrangements for their restoration; who accordingly proceeded to Appalachicola, with Captain Pintado, named commissioner on the part of the Spaniards.") His correspondence from April and May 1815 was sent to the new governor, José de Soto, who now succeeded Manrique. Spencer would not allow the runaway Spanish slaves to be returned by force. In the presence of Pintado, the colonial marines were disarmed, and discharged from British service. Pintado's report states that Spencer told the Spanish fugitives that they could not be transported to British territory, (Note: [Spencer] solemnly declared that, under no circumstances, were [Spanish fugitive slaves] to board English ships,) and warned them that he foresaw future vengeful behavior on the part of the Americans. Pintado interviewed 128 Spanish slaves, he was able to persuade only 10, all women, to return voluntarily. He estimated 250 runaways to be present.

Cochrane had set the precedence that the fugitive slaves could not be returned by force to the Spanish. (Note: Cochrane's letter to Manrique, composed on the Tonnant, off Mobile February 10, 1815 does state: 'Situated as I am with so few white Troops at Appalachicola it would be attended with much hazard the making use of forcible measures [of returning the Spanish slave fugitives] which accordingly I must entirely decline.' The original transcript is stored within: Letters from Commander-in-Chief, North America: 1815, nos. 1–126 (ADM 1/508)) Even before this, the same rationale was mentioned in Robert Henry's communication to Manrique, dated January 12, which puts forward the same argument that the armed men of the Corps of Colonial Marines outnumbered their European counterparts by a ratio of five to one. Urcullo concurred, and mentioned this in his report to Manrique dated January 23, 1815.

The remainder of the Royal Marine infantry cadre, which had garrisoned Prospect Bluff, embarked HMS Seahorse on April 22, thereby withdrawing from Florida. Pintado also embarked, accompanied by ten slaves who consented to return under an amnesty. Pintado disembarked on April 27, the slaves disembarked on April 29. He submitted a report to De Soto, Manrique's successor, on April 29.

The discord reoccurred when similar tensions resurfaced between Jackson and the Spanish, at the time of the First Seminole War. To facilitate a more cordial relationship with the Spanish, the recent issues of slave insurrection were portrayed as attributable to perfidious British influences during the War of 1812. (Note: Letter from John Quincy Adams to George W. Erving, United States Ambassador to Spain dated December 12, 1818. 'To this letter are annexed fourteen documents, the greater part of which consist of remonstrations, addressed during the late war between the United States and Great Britain to British officers, against their continual violations of the neutrality of the Spanish territory.')
