= José de Soto =

Spanish military officer (born 1757)

11th Governor of West Florida
- In office March 31, 1815 – March 3, 1816
- Preceded by: Mateo González Manrique
- Succeeded by: Mauricio de Zúñiga

Personal details
- Born: 1757 Cuba
- Died: 1824 (aged 66–67) Cuba
- Spouse: María Belén Iznaga y Pérez de Vargas Sotomayor
- Occupation: Colonial Administrator, Soldier

Military service
- Allegiance: Spain
- Branch/service: Spanish Army
- Rank: Colonel
- Commands: Spanish Florida

José de Soto (1757 – 1824), also known as Joseph de Soto, was a Spanish military officer who served as the Governor of West Florida from February 1815 to March 1816.

He commanded the Pensacola garrison that surrendered in November 1814 to Andrew Jackson. Upon becoming governor, he continued unsuccessful efforts to recapture fugitive slaves from Spanish Florida that had been freed by the British in the previous year.

== Career ==
=== Early career ===
As of 1788, he was second lieutenant in the 18th Infantry Regiment of Spain, garrisoned in Cuba. On March 9, 1790, attached to one of the fixed regiments of Havana, he is a Captain. On August 16, 1795 he was promoted to Sargento mayor in the Cuban Regimiento Fijo de la Havana.

In 1802, he was named commander of the third battalion of the Cuban infantry regiment. On September 7, 1804, he was promoted to Lieutenant Colonel. In 1815 he was promoted to the rank of Colonel and given command of the Havana infantry regiment, which he held for 9 years until his death.

=== Creek War prelude and Jackson's attack on Pensacola ===
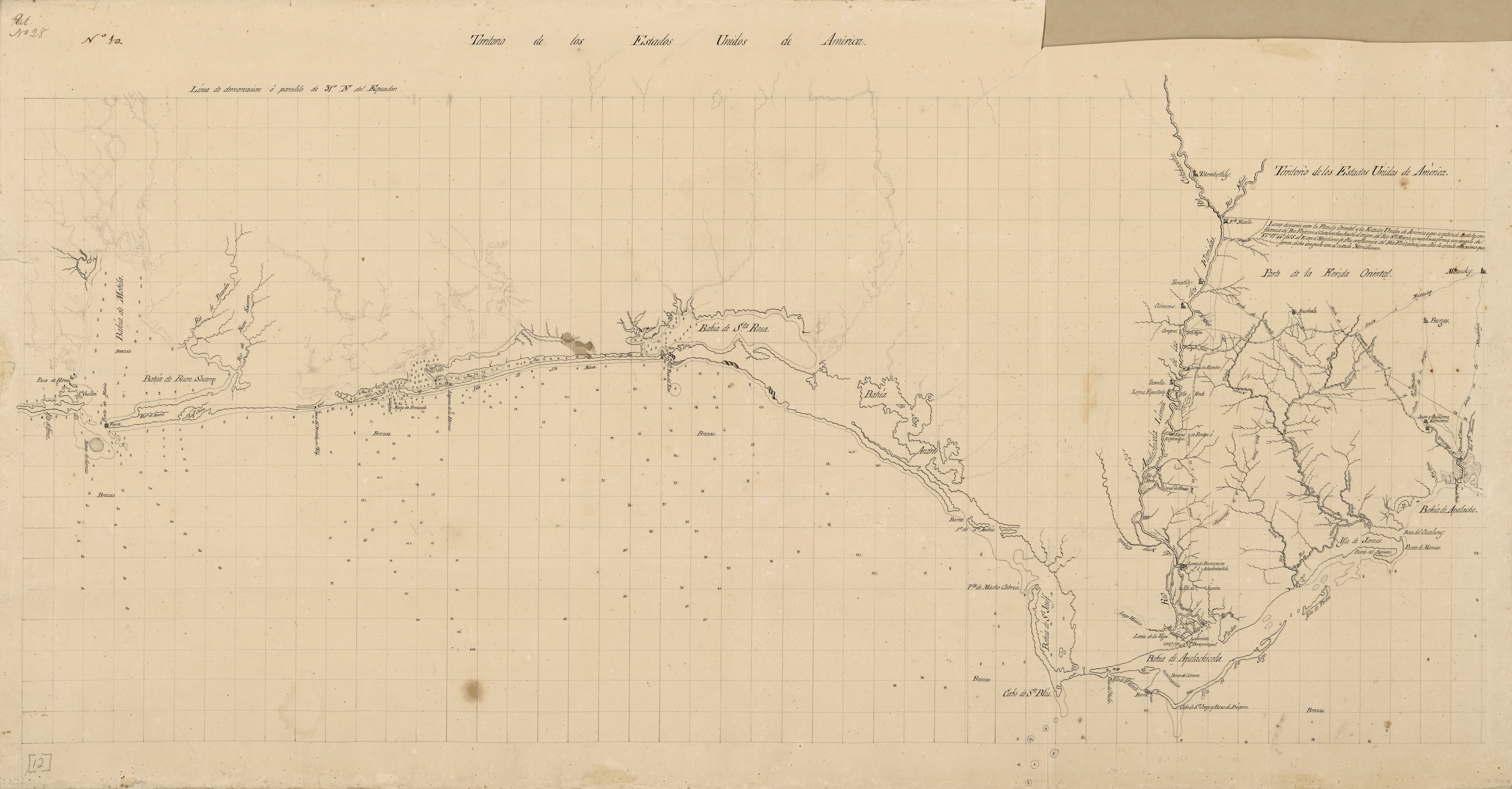
Map of Spanish East and West Florida, stretching from Mobile Bay to Apalachee Bay, with the American border to the north, 1815.

In July 1813, de Soto was witness to the visit to Pensacola by Peter McQueen, just prior to the commencement of the Creek War.

On November 7, 1814, de Soto surrendered Fort San Miguel to Jackson, at the behest of Manrique.

=== Restitution of Spanish property ===
The Spanish Governor, Manrique, sought not only the runaway Spanish slaves, but also the return of the soldiers. Both had been spirited away in November 1814 when the British retreated after the Battle of Pensacola (1814). His first efforts at recovery in January 1815 were fruitless, and upon arriving at Prospect Bluff, his emissary Lt. José Urcullo was dismissed by Captain Robert Henry. Arrangements for the return of the soldiers to Pensacola by the Royal Navy were made in February 1815.

Regarding the runaway Spanish slaves, he wrote a covering letter to Vice Admiral Alexander Cochrane on March 9, attached to 'a representation from the Inhabitants of Pensacola respecting their losses'. Writing from HMS Royal Oak, off Mobile Bay, on March 15, 1815, Rear Admiral Pulteney Malcolm, Cochrane's subordinate commander of the Mobile Squadron, assured Manrique that Post-Captain Robert Cavendish Spencer had been detailed to conduct a strict enquiry into the conduct of Lieutenant Colonel Edward Nicolls and Captain George Woodbine, regarding the property losses of Spanish inhabitants of Florida. Malcolm believed that in cases where formerly enslaved persons could not be persuaded to return to their owners, the British government would undertake to remunerate the owners.

In February 1815, de Soto is purported to have replaced Manrique as Governor, and took over these efforts for the emancipated slaves to be returned to Spanish territory. Manrique's last correspondence on the matter to Cochrane was dated March 9, 1815. Manrique held the post of Governor until March 31, 1815, according to another source.

Vicente Sebastián Pintado traveled to Prospect Bluff, arriving there on April 7, his counterpart Spencer of the Royal Navy having arrived earlier. (Note: Enclosure 8 to Erving. Memorandum of a gentleman of respectability at Bermuda, dated May 21, 1815 "Admiral Cochrane, however, appears to have disapproved of Nicholls's conduct in affording protection to the Spanish slaves, and had sent the Hon. Captain Spencer to Pensacola for the purpose of making arrangements for their restoration; who accordingly proceeded to Appalachicola, with Captain Pintado, named commissioner on the part of the Spaniards.") Eugenio Joseph Sierra, a respected Pensacola surgeon, and William McPherson as representative of the partners of John Forbes & Company, accompanied Pintado. His correspondence from April 29, 1815 was sent to the new governor, José de Soto, who now succeeded Manrique. Spencer would not allow the runaway Spanish slaves to be returned by force. In the presence of Pintado, the colonial marines - freed former slaves - were disarmed, and discharged from British service. Spencer told them that new orders meant they could no longer be transported to British territory, and warned them that he foresaw future vengeful behavior on the part of the Americans. Pintado interviewed 128 Spanish slaves, he was able to persuade only 10, all women, to return voluntarily. He estimated 250 runaways to be present. On May 16, the British evacuated the last of the garrison there.

De Soto's correspondence with his superior in Havana - dated July 15, 1815 - complained that the Negro Fort had become a refuge for "villains of all classes and Nations," and that it made Great Britain undoubtedly “the master of trade” throughout this region.

=== Latter years ===
Zúñiga took over the governorship of West Florida in March 1816.

In 1818, during the Seminole Wars, American officials accused de Soto of "supplying arms and other support to Seminole and Creek Indians at war."

De Soto died in 1824 in Cuba.
