= Battle of Pensacola (1814) =

Battle of the War of 1812

- Part of the War of 1812
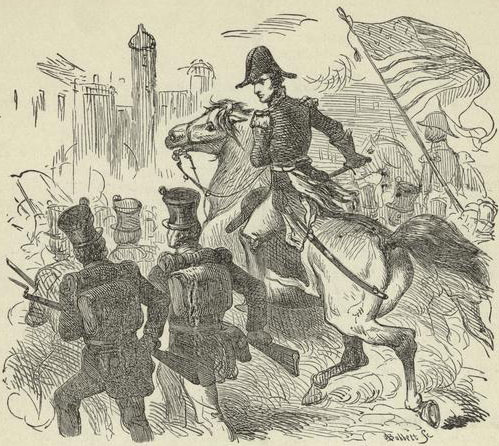
- Jackson and his troops entering Pensacola on November 6, 1814
Date	7–9 November 1814
Location	Pensacola, Spanish Florida
Result	American victory
Territorial changes	United States occupation of Pensacola

Belligerents
United States	United Kingdom (Spain) Spanish Florida; Creeks

Commanders and leaders
(United States) Andrew Jackson	(Spain) Mateo Manrique (surrendered) (United Kingdom of Great Britain and Ireland) Edward Nicolls (United Kingdom of Great Britain and Ireland) James Alexander Gordon

Strength
3-4,000 infantry 5 artillery pieces	British: 200 infantry from Royal Marines, Red Sticks and Royal Marine Artillery; Unknown artillery and black slaves 1 fort 1 coastal battery Creek: Unknown warriors Spanish: 500 infantry unknown artillery pieces 1 fort

Casualties and losses
American: 7 killed and 11 wounded	Spanish: 14 killed and 6 wounded

The Battle of Pensacola (7–9 November 1814) took place, following the Creek War, as part of the Gulf Coast operations during the War of 1812. General Andrew Jackson led his infantry against British and Spanish forces controlling the city of Pensacola in Spanish Florida. The Spanish forces surrendered the city to Jackson, and the outlying British contingent withdrew.

The battle was the only engagement of the war to take place in territory under the sovereignty of the Kingdom of Spain.

== Background ==
=== Horseshoe Bend ===
Many refugees fled to Spanish West Florida (see Prospect Bluff) after the Red Stick Creeks were defeated at the Battle of Horseshoe Bend at the end of the Creek War.

Captain Woodbine of the Royal Marines made contact with Indians. After a meeting of various elders held aboard HMS Orpheus (1809) on May 20, weapons and other gifts were provided by the British. Woodbine was appointed as British Agent to the Creek Nations. The presence of the Orpheus in the Apalachicola was reported to Generals Flournoy and Jackson in June.

=== Escalation of tensions with Jackson ===
Upon receiving reports that the British had landed on Spanish soil to arm natives at war with the United States, and Manrique had not intervened, Jackson's letter to Manrique dated July 12 warned of "disagreeable consequences" if this intelligence was true. He sent John Gordon (militia captain) to Pensacola, to see Manrique, and to gather information. Gordon traveled to Pensacola, arriving on July 20, 1814. His report dated July 29 was provided to Jackson. He had spoken to Governor Manrique, to whom he delivered a letter from Jackson earlier that day. Given that Americans were harming Indians in Spanish territory without the consent of the Governor, he felt authorized to arm the Indians, it being implied to Gordon this would take place. Based upon what others told him, it was rumored the Indians were being provided with arms and ammunition by the Spanish 'but did not see it myself.' The report made mention of discovering there was now a British presence at Prospect Bluff, and others confirming that three thousand muskets had been supplied by the British earlier that year.

Manrique's response dated July 26 referred to the site of the landing as being in the territory of the Indians, not the Spanish. Regarding the surrender of two chiefs to the Americans, their presence being denied, he deplored the hypocrisy with which Spanish fugitives had been allowed to roam free by the Americans. He was critical that Baratarian pirates led by Jean Lafitte were undertaking their operations from American soil, and had not been apprehended by the authorities, resulting in losses to Spanish citizens.

It became apparent that Jackson would be prepared to attack Pensacola. Jackson would force the issue, being well aware of Manrique's position of weakness. In his letter dated August 24, Jackson criticized Manrique for allowing British agents to operate in Pensacola and warned him that he would consider him personally responsible for any depredations suffered by American citizens.

Manrique was in a precarious situation. He appealed for assistance to his superior in Havana, Juan Ruiz de Apodaca the Captain General of Cuba and Florida, but none was forthcoming. He reported to Apodaca that he would not be able to prevent the British from landing. He took the initiative, and in August 1814 approached the British, inviting them to Pensacola. This was a radical change from the existing policy of holding small populated enclaves with the meager garrison, and avoiding confrontation with either the Americans or the British. The British were observed docking the 25th and unloading the 26th. It has been theorized that Manrique was anticipating a substantial British force would be deployed to the Gulf Coast, to which Woodbine and Nicolls were a prelude. The evidence indicates this was promised to him by Nicolls. Rumors were circulating in Pensacola that this would be taking place. The newspapers in Havana were reporting that 25,000 soldiers of Wellington's peninsular army had allegedly arrived in Bermuda in August. In a letter to Manrique dated September 9, Jackson expressed his consternation that the British flag was flown at Pensacola when Florida was 'under the most strict plea of neutrality'.

Jackson hinted in his letter to James Monroe dated September 5 that the seizure of Pensacola, and its subsequent occupation by an American garrison, in concert with Fort Bowyer at Mobile and a fort on Appalachicola would secure the area. In response, Monroe's letter to Jackson dated October 21 requests that the matter of Pensacola is not to be addressed by an attack by Jackson, but by diplomatic means, and that instead he is to prepare for the anticipated arrival of a British task force in Louisiana. (Note: 'I hasten to communicate to you, the directions of the President, that you should at present take no measures, which would involve this Government in a contest with Spain. ... it is deemed more proper, that a representation of the insolent and unjustifiable conduct of the Governor of Pensacola, should be made to that Government thro' the Ordinary channels of communication than that you should resent it by an attack on Pensacola.') Before this instruction arrived, Jackson wrote a letter to Monroe, dated October 26, explaining he was going to make an attack, and his rationale for so doing.

=== Nicolls's military mission in August 1814 ===
At Bermuda, on July 4, 1814, Carron and Hermes embarked a company-strength force of Royal Marines, commanded by Edward Nicolls, for deployment on the Gulf Coast. When the British stopped at Havana on August 4, prior to sailing to the Florida coast, they made contact with Apodaca, the Captain General of Cuba and Florida. An anonymous letter sent from Havana, authored by American merchant and vice-consul Vincent Gray, which found its way into the hands of the Governor of Louisiana William C. C. Claiborne, mentioned that permission to land in Pensacola had been denied to the British. (Note: The letter mentions that the British sought permission 'to land at Pensacola, all of which were refused by the captaln-general. However, I learn that they are determined to land at Pensacola with or without leave, where they will disembark their park of artillery'.) On August 5 Hermes, with Carron accompanying, departed from Havana. They arrived at the mouth of the Apalachicola River eight days later, on August 13, 1814. From August 13 through August 21, Hermes was in the river. A vessel arrived from Pensacola, having been hired by Captain Woodbine, to transfer warlike stores from Prospect Bluff to Pensacola, with the tacit approval of Manrique. When Nicolls arrived at Prospect Bluff in August with 300 British uniforms and 1000 muskets, Manrique, fully aware of the threat the Americans posed to Florida, requested the redeployment of British forces to Pensacola. (Note: Captain Percy to Admiral Cochrane: 'I assented to re-embark the marines and proceed to that place; acquainting him [Nicolls] at the same time with my firm determination, in the event of not receiving a request from the Governor to land them, immediately to return to the anchorage off the Apalachicola, as I had promised the Captain-General, at the Havannah, not to land on Spanish territory without being requested to do so.' 'On the 21st August I left Apalachicola, and arrived at this anchorage on the 23rd; having fallen in with, off the bar, and brought with me sloop HMS Sophie. I fortunately found that a letter from the governor had been sent to me, requiring the naval force might be brought down, as he was threatened with an attack by the Americans: on the next morning I waited on the governor, when he requested me to disembark the detachment, ammunition, &c. which I immediately complied with. The fort San Miguel, the only one near the town, was put into the hands of Lieutenant-Colonel Nicolls; and the British colours were hoisted in conjunction with the Spanish, which he informed me was done with the governor's approbation.') During this time, HMS Sophie arrived at Prospect Bluff, her commander, Lockyer, was met by Major Nicolls Woodbine decided to remain at Pensacola, but dispatched Lockyer to Apalachicola with orders to return with all the remaining arms and a request for all British forces arriving there to join him at Pensacola.

Correspondence from Nicolls to Cochrane advised that upon Woodbine's arrival at Pensacola, 'he was received by the Spanish Governor in the greatest terms of friendship, and solicited by the Governor for his assistance in protecting the town of Pensacola from the immediate attack of the Americans'. Notwithstanding the rosy picture presented by Nicolls, relations between Nicolls and Manrique became strained in the following months.

The British were observed docking the 25th and unloading the 26th. At Pensacola on August 26, 1814, Nicolls issued an order of the day for the 'First Colonial battalion of the Royal Corps of Marines', and at the same time issued a widely disseminated proclamation to the people of Louisiana, urging them to join forces with the British and Indian allies against the American government. (Note: Nicolls 'issued a proclamation to the effect that he was at the head of the advance guard of a British force... coming to help the Indians) Both proclamations were reproduced in Niles' Register of Baltimore. These were a ruse as to the real strength of the British. The "numerous British and Spanish squadron of ships and vessels of war" he described comprised two sixth-rates and two sloops of the Royal Navy (Hermes, Carron, Sophie, Childers), the "good train of artillery" comprised three cannon and twelve gunners, whilst the "battalion" was a company-strength group of 100 Royal Marines infantry, detached from Major George Lewis's battalion.

Nicolls trained and equipped Creek refugees. The British had armed and recruited 500 Indians and 100 blacks as of September 10.

Nicolls set out from Pensacola, for a demonstration of force, in attacking Fort Bowyer near Mobile. (This was Spanish territory that been annexed by United States General James Wilkinson in 1813 just prior to Manrique's tenure.) The attack was a failure, resulting in a loss of face. This defeat sowed seeds of doubt and made Manrique consider whether the British were able to defend Pensacola. One disruptive element of the British presence was that slaves could flee their masters, to join Nicolls. Over 100 slaves in Pensacola alone took up this opportunity. The looting of the Forbes Company store at Bon Secour was another manifestation that the rights of property ownership of Spanish nationals were not being upheld.

Common knowledge of tensions between Manrique and Nicolls were referred to in a communication from Jackson to James Monroe dated October 10. In the prelude to the attack on Pensacola, this division made any concerted effort impossible. Manrique had no desire to antagonize Jackson, the British wanted a more aggressive approach. To this end, Manrique sought to retain control of the defense of Pensacola. In this power struggle, the British threatened to withdraw their forces unless both the harbor and Fort San Carlos were placed under the joint control of Nicolls and Manrique. Protesting his neutrality, Manrique retorted that it was not in the power of the Governor to declare war, as Gordon wryly noted in his correspondence with Cochrane.

British relations deteriorated with the Spanish governor, so the British force left the town and consolidated in the outlying Fort San Carlos and at the Santa Rosa Punta de Siguenza battery (later rebuilt as Fort Pickens).

=== Preparations at Pensacola ===
General Jackson planned to drive the British from Pensacola in Spanish Florida, then march to New Orleans to defend the city against any British attack. His forces had been diminished due to desertions, so he was forced to wait for Brigadier General John Coffee and his volunteers before moving against the city. Jackson and Coffee met at Pierce's Stockade in Alabama. Jackson assembled a force of up to 4,000 men; he moved out towards Pensacola on November 2 and reached it on November 6. The forces in the Anglo-Spanish fort totaled 700 men. It consisted of about 500 Spanish infantry, with some Spanish artillery pieces, with around 200 British infantry and Creek warriors. Jackson first sent Major Henri Piere as a messenger under a white flag of truce to Spanish Governor Mateo González Manrique. However, the messenger approached the city and was fired upon by the garrison in Fort San Miguel. Jackson then sent a second messenger, this time a Spaniard, and offered to garrison the forts with Americans, who would hold them until relieved by Spanish troops; this would ensure Spain's neutrality in the conflict. Manrique rejected the offer.

== Battle ==
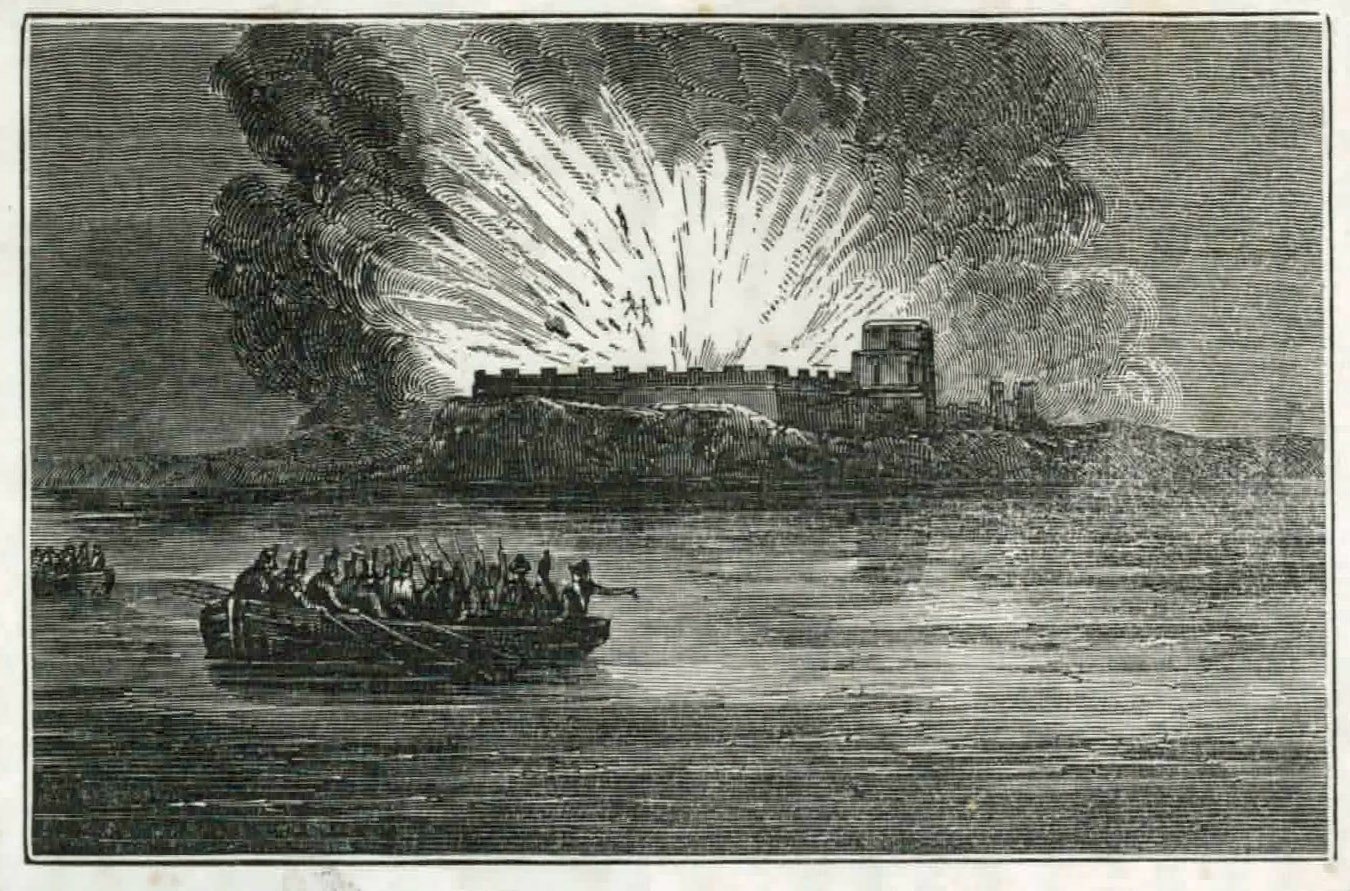
Destruction of Fort Barrancas by the British

At dawn, Jackson had 3,000 troops marching on the city. (Note: Captain John Gordon estimated there were 5 cannons and 3,000 troops in his correspondence to Vice Admiral Cochrane. When Nicolls recounted the events of Pensacola in 1817, he claimed there were 5,000 troops.) The Americans flanked the city from the east to avoid fire from the forts and marched along the beachfront, but the sandy beach made it difficult to move up the artillery. The attack went ahead nonetheless and was met with resistance in the center of town by a line of infantry supported by a battery. However, the Americans charged and captured the battery. Fort San Miguel and the garrison numbering 268 troops surrendered on November 7. Under the terms of the surrender, Jackson's troops would occupy the fort until such time as a relieving force dispatched from Spain were to arrive, thereby preventing the British from further violating Spanish neutrality. Fort San Carlos, which lay 14 miles to the west, remained in British hands.

Jackson planned to capture the fort by storm the next day. On the morning of the 8th Captain Gordon saw 2,000 men and 3 cannon marching towards their fort. It was blown up and abandoned before Jackson could move on it and the remaining British withdrew from Pensacola along with the British squadron (comprising HMS Seahorse (38 guns; Capt. Gordon), HMS Carron (20 guns; Capt. Spencer), HMS Sophie (18 guns), HMS Childers (18 guns; Capt. Umfreville) and HMS Shelburne (12 guns). (Note: Millett's summary of events: 'The town was overrun; the Americans met little resistance from Spanish residents. The British had taken refuge in Fort Barrancas, located at the mouth of the harbor. As the situation became hopeless, they decided to board the British fleet anchored in the bay, blow up Fort Barrancas, and retreat to the fort on the Apalachicola River. In the ensuing chaos British forces, their Indian allies, nearly the entire slave population of Pensacola, and over two hundred Spanish troops (most of whom were black and from Havana) evacuated the town.') Nicolls took with him a large proportion of the Spanish garrison, 363 embarked supernumeraries, who did not return to Pensacola until 1815. (Note: Cochrane's letter to Manrique, composed on the Tonnant, off Mobile 10 February 1815 does state: 'Sorry that it has not been in my power to bring back the Spanish Soldiers from that vicinity ...., but in a few days I will dedicate a Sloop of War Solely to that purpose' The original transcript is stored within: Letters from Commander-in-Chief, North America: 1815, nos. 1–126 (ADM 1/508)) (Note: Letter from Admiral Cochrane to Admiral Malcolm composed on the Tonnant, off Mobile 17 February 1815 'The Spanish Governor at Pensacola, having requested that a part of the Spanish Troops removed to the Bluff, when the American Army attacked ...you will send a troop ship to Appalachicola to receive them on board, and land them in the harbour of Pensacola'. Archive reference ADM 1/508 folios 556–561, which has been reproduced in its entirety in a secondary source.)

== Aftermath ==
Jackson's letter to Manrique dated November 9 expresses his disappointment that the British blew up Fort San Carlos, in breach of what was promised, and as such he was no longer prepared to aid him with protecting Spanish neutrality with American troops. Jackson's letter to Monroe dated November 14 provides a status update relative to his 'intended movement against Pensacola.' He mentions the destruction caused as 'the British and Spanish were blowing up the works.' Acknowledging that his attack was 'Not having the Sanction of my Government,' he decided against neither repairing Fort San Miguel, nor occupying it with an American garrison, but to withdraw his troops in order to protect the frontier. Jackson suspected the squadron which had left Pensacola harbor would return to strike at Mobile, Alabama. Whilst in Pensacola, Jackson received confirmation a week later of a British task force in Jamaica, destined for New Orleans, so he marched to Mobile, arriving there on November 19. Jackson abandoned Pensacola to the Spanish and set out to Mobile, and upon reaching the town he received requests to hurry to the defense of New Orleans.

The battle had forced the British out of Pensacola and left the Spanish in control. Hyde states that Spanish inhabitants of Pensacola were angered by the British destruction of Fort Barrancas and the removal of part of the Spanish garrison. The capture and brief occupation of Pensacola had the effect of alienating the British from the Spanish, and conversely endearing the Americans to the latter, according to Jackson, and one account from a Pensacola resident to his brother. Nonetheless, Cox notes that citizens of Pensacola filed claims with the US Government, for losses suffered during the occupation under Jackson, when slaves were murdered. Admiral Cochrane remarked to General Lambert that the attack on Pensacola had a detrimentally big impact upon the momentum of the offensive against New Orleans.

American casualties were negligible; around seven dead and eleven wounded. (Two officers and nine enlisted men wounded are documented by Eaton.) The Spanish suffered fourteen dead and six wounded, according to Owsley. Lieutenant Colonel Edward Nicolls stated there were no deaths among the British, and was of the opinion that the Americans suffered 15 fatalities and numerous casualties. (Note: The primary source used by Nicolas is a letter from Edward Nicolls to Lord Bathurst dated 5 May 1817, UK National Archives reference WO 1/344, folio 421. '[We] retreated fighting from the place without the loss of a man... and causing a loss to the enemy of 15 killed and some officers & privates wounded in the face of 5000 men and 5 pieces of cannon, with only 700 men [of the Anglo-Spanish force]' The purpose of the letter was for Nicolls to be reimbursed for expenses in relation to Nicolls entertaining the Creek indians.) Four active infantry battalions of the Regular Army (1-1 Inf, 2-1 Inf, 2-7 Inf and 3-7 Inf) perpetuate the lineages of American units (elements of the old 3rd, 39th and 44th Infantry Regiments) that were at the Battle of Pensacola.

== See also ==
- First Battle of Fort Bowyer

== Notes and citations ==
Notes

Citations

Bibliography

- "Film reel 4, Admiralty Records, North America, 1815", Letters from Commanders-in-Chief, North America: 1815, nos. 1–126., War of 1812 Documents from the British National Archives microfilm, The Historic New Orleans Collection, 2006, ADM 1/508
- Bassett, John Spencer, ed. (1969) [1927]. Correspondence of Andrew Jackson. Vol. II: May 1, 1814 to December 31, 1819. Washington, D.C.: Carnegie Institution of Washington. OCLC 1082121859.
- Boyd, Mark F. (1937). "Events at Prospect Bluff on the Apalachicola River, 1808-1818". Florida Historical Society. 16 (2): 55–96.
- Boyd, Mark F. (1958). "Historical sites in and around the Jim Woodruff reservoir area Florida-Georgia". Smithsonian Institution, Bureau of American Ethnology. River Basin Surveys Papers, No. 13 (Bulletin 169). Washington: GPO: 195–314. doi:10.6067/XCV8J9663S.
- Cox, Dale (2020). The fort at Prospect Bluff. Old Kitchen Books. ISBN 978-0-57-863462-3.
- Eaton, John Henry; Reid, John (1828). The life of Major General Andrew Jackson (3rd ed.). McCarty & Davis.
- Eaton, Joseph H. (2013) [1851]. "Film reel M1832, 1 roll. ARC ID: 1184633.". Returns of Killed and Wounded in Battles or Engagements with Indians and British and Mexican Troops, 1790–1848. Record Group 94: Records of the Adjutant General's Office, 1762–1984. National Archives and Records Administration, Washington D.C.
- Fisher, Ruth Anna (1949). "The Surrender of Pensacola as Told by the British". The American Historical Review. 54 (2): 326–329. JSTOR 1845391.
- Fraser, Edward; Carr-Laughton, L. G. (1930). The Royal Marine Artillery 1804-1923, Volume 1 [1804-1859]. London: The Royal United Services Institution. OCLC 4986867.
- Heidler, David Stephen; Heidler, Jeanne T (2003). Old Hickory's War: Andrew Jackson and the Quest for Empire. Louisiana State University Press. ISBN 978-0-8071-2867-1.
- Hughes, Christine F.; Brodine, Charles E., eds. (2023). The Naval War of 1812: A Documentary History, Vol. 4. Washington: Naval Historical Center (GPO). ISBN 978-1-943604-36-4.
- Hyde, Samuel C. (2004): A Fierce and Fractious Frontier: The Curious Development of Louisiana's Florida Parishes, 1699–2000. Louisiana State University Press. ISBN 0807129232
- James, William (2002) [1827]. The Naval History of Great Britain. Vol. 6, 1811–1827. Conway Maritime Press. ISBN 0-85177-910-7.
- Latour, Arsène Lacarrière (1816). Historical Memoir of the War in West Florida and Louisiana in 1814–15, With an Atlas. translated by H. P. Nugent. Philadelphia: John Conrad & Co. OCLC 1413399.
- Mahon, John K (1991). The War Of 1812. Da Capo Press. ISBN 0306804298.
- Marshall, John (1829). "Percy, William Henry" . Royal Naval Biography. Vol. sup, part 3. London: Longman and Company. pp. 64–70.
- Millett, Nathaniel (2005). "Britain's 1814 Occupation of Pensacola and America's Response: An Episode of the War of 1812 in the Southeastern Borderlands". Florida Historical Quarterly. 84 (2): 229–255.
- Millett, Nathaniel (2013). The Maroons of Prospect Bluff and Their Quest for Freedom in the Atlantic World. University Press of Florida. ISBN 978-0-81-304454-5 – via Florida Scholarship online within Oxford University Press.
- Nicolas, Paul Harris (1845): Historical Record of the Royal Marine Forces. Volume 2, 1805–1842
- Owsley, Frank L. Jr. (2017) [1981]. Struggle for the Gulf Borderlands: The Creek War and the Battle of New Orleans, 1812–1815 (PDF). Gainesville: University Press of Florida. ISBN 978-0-8173-1062-2.
- Patterson, Benton Rains (2008), The Generals, Andrew Jackson, Sir Edward Pakenham, and the road to New Orleans, New York: New York University Press, ISBN 978-0-8147-6717-7
- Sugden, John (January 1982). "The Southern Indians in the War of 1812: The Closing Phase". Florida Historical Quarterly. 60 (3): 300. JSTOR 30146793.
- Tucker, Spencer (ed). (2012): The Encyclopedia of the War of 1812: A Political, Social, and Military History. ABC-CLIO. ISBN 1851099565
- Wilentz, Sean (2005). Andrew Jackson. New York, NY: Henry Holt and Company. ISBN 978-0-8050-6925-9. OCLC 863515036.
- "Documents Relating to Colonel Edward Nicholls and Captain George Woodbine in Pensacola, 1814". Florida Historical Quarterly. The Greenslade Papers: 51–54. July 1931.
