= Vicente Sebastián Pintado =

Spanish cartographer and military officer

Vicente Sebastian Pintado

Personal details
- Born: Vicente Sebastian Pintado y Brito; February 20, 1774 Santa Cruz de La Palma, Canary Islands (Spain)
- Died: August 20, 1829 (aged 55) Havana, Cuba
- Spouse: Maria Teresa Eulalia Balderas
- Occupation: Cartographer, engineer, military officer and land surveyor

Vicente Sebastian Pintado y Brito (February 20, 1774 - August 20, 1829) was a Spanish cartographer, engineer, military officer and land surveyor of Spanish Louisiana and Spanish West Florida. He is known for conducting surveys of lands for settlers who had requested grants in Louisiana and Florida, as well as the so-called "Pintado plan", a street map of Pensacola drawn in 1812 which included the position and size of the solares designated for construction of the city's church and other public buildings.

In the course of his military career, he suppressed the 1795 Pointe Coupee slave Conspiracy and the 1804 Kemper Rebellion. As a man familiar with violent uprisings, and having been Alcalde (a magistrate) since 1800, he was sent on a diplomatic mission in 1815, to negotiate for the recovery of fugitive slaves from a British outpost of the Royal Navy.

He lived for more than 35 years in America (25 of them in Louisiana and Florida) and left a large corpus of work consisting of maps, plats, letters and documents vital to an understanding of the complicated sale of lands in Florida and Louisiana during the period.

In 1974, the Library of Congress in Washington, D.C. obtained a donation of the Pintado Collection, a collection of about 1,500 documents now stored in its Division of Manuscripts.

== Biography ==
=== Early years ===
Vicente Sebastian Pintado was born on February 20, 1774, in Santa Cruz de La Palma (Canary Islands, Spain). His parents were Diego Eligio Pintado and Antonia de Brito y Salazax. Although little is known of his youth, Beerman theorizes he would be expected to have had a good background in mathematics and design. It has been theorized his family may have migrated to Louisiana as part of the Canary Islander, or Isleño, settlements in the 1770s.

His presence in Louisiana in 1793 is first documented, when Pintado sailed for Havana, Cuba aboard the barque La Hermosa María Yendo de Campo. During its passage north of Tolvos island he prepared a maritime chart of latitudes, this being his first commission as a cartographer. From Havana, he was ordered to Louisiana, a Spanish province at the time.

=== Louisiana ===
In 1794-1795, Pintado served under baron Francisco Luis Héctor de Carondelet, the governor of Louisiana and West Florida, headquartered at New Orleans. Carondelet entrusted him with the command of a sloop to carry out various commissions, operating from the Spanish fort San Juan del Bayou that protected the Lake Pontchartrain entrance of Bayou St. John and Lake Borgne, often carrying letters from Carondelet to the Captain General of Cuba, Luis de las Casas.

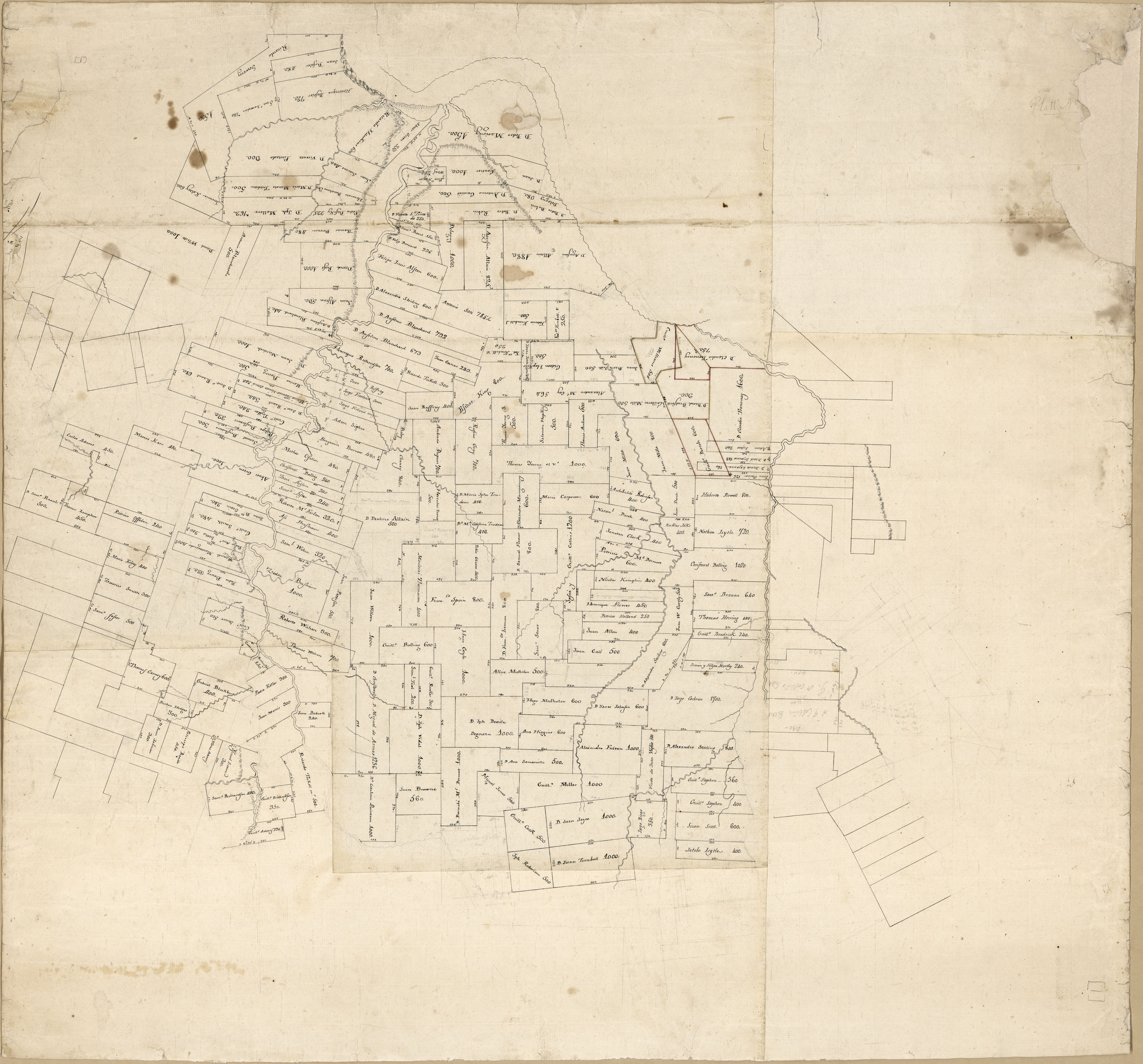
Map of the New Feliciana District in Spanish West Florida, by Pintado.

In 1795, at the behest of Carondolet, Pintado led a survey of the lands around the fort at Christian Pass (Pasa Cristian), as well as 1,300 acres of land on the banks of the Carondelet Canal belonging to Jean Baptiste Macarty, colonel of the militia of New Orleans. Pintado subsequently performed numerous other surveys in Louisiana. In 1796 Carondelet commissioned Pintado to conduct a survey of lands granted to Ambrosio Longue-Épée in Iberville County on the west bank of the Mississippi River opposite Baton Rouge. After the work was completed, on May 1 of that year Carondelet appointed him assistant surveyor of Spanish Louisiana, an office he occupied from 1796 to 1805. In 1797, Carondelet instructed Pintado to do surveys in the district of New Feliciana north of Baton Rouge, and in 1798 he served as captain of mounted militias raised in the same district. The following year he bought some land near Baton Rouge.

On April 1, 1800, Pintado was appointed mayor and commandant of the militia in Bayou Sara, near the modern city of St. Francisville on the Mississippi River, replacing the late Captain Anselmo Blanchard. He continued to serve as a Captain, albeit in the cavalry squadron of the Legion Mixta de Milicias del Misisipi After the recovery of Louisiana by France in 1801 and its sale to the United States in 1803, the political climate around Baton Rouge became precarious for Pintado. In 1804, three brothers, Samuel, Nathan and Reuben Kemper, wanting to separate this region from Spanish control and deliver it to the United States, attempted to foment a rebellion. On August 7, Samuel and Nathan Kemper marched on Baton Rouge with some 30 men to seize the fort.

According to the last treaty, Baton Rouge was under Spanish sovereignty, although most of its inhabitants were Anglos who preferred the sale of Louisiana to the United States. On hearing of the impending attack on Baton Rouge, the Spanish governor, Carlos de Grand Pré, prepared to defend Baton Rouge, forcing the withdrawal of the Kemper brothers to Bayou Sara, which was still under the command of Pintado. The rebels subsequently captured the settlement, burning its houses and a cotton mill. Pintado managed to escape and led a detachment of troops to harass those Americans who supported Kemper, forcing the insurgents to withdraw above the 31st parallel of latitude north, into the Territory of Mississippi. The Kemper brothers, undaunted by this setback, organized another assault the following year, with Ruben Kemper moving to the Bahamas where he solicited the British government for aid in expelling the Spanish from Baton Rouge. Pintado assisted in repelling this latest intrusion by the rebels, and on September 3, 1805, Nathan and Samuel Kemper were arrested by the Spanish authorities.

=== Florida ===
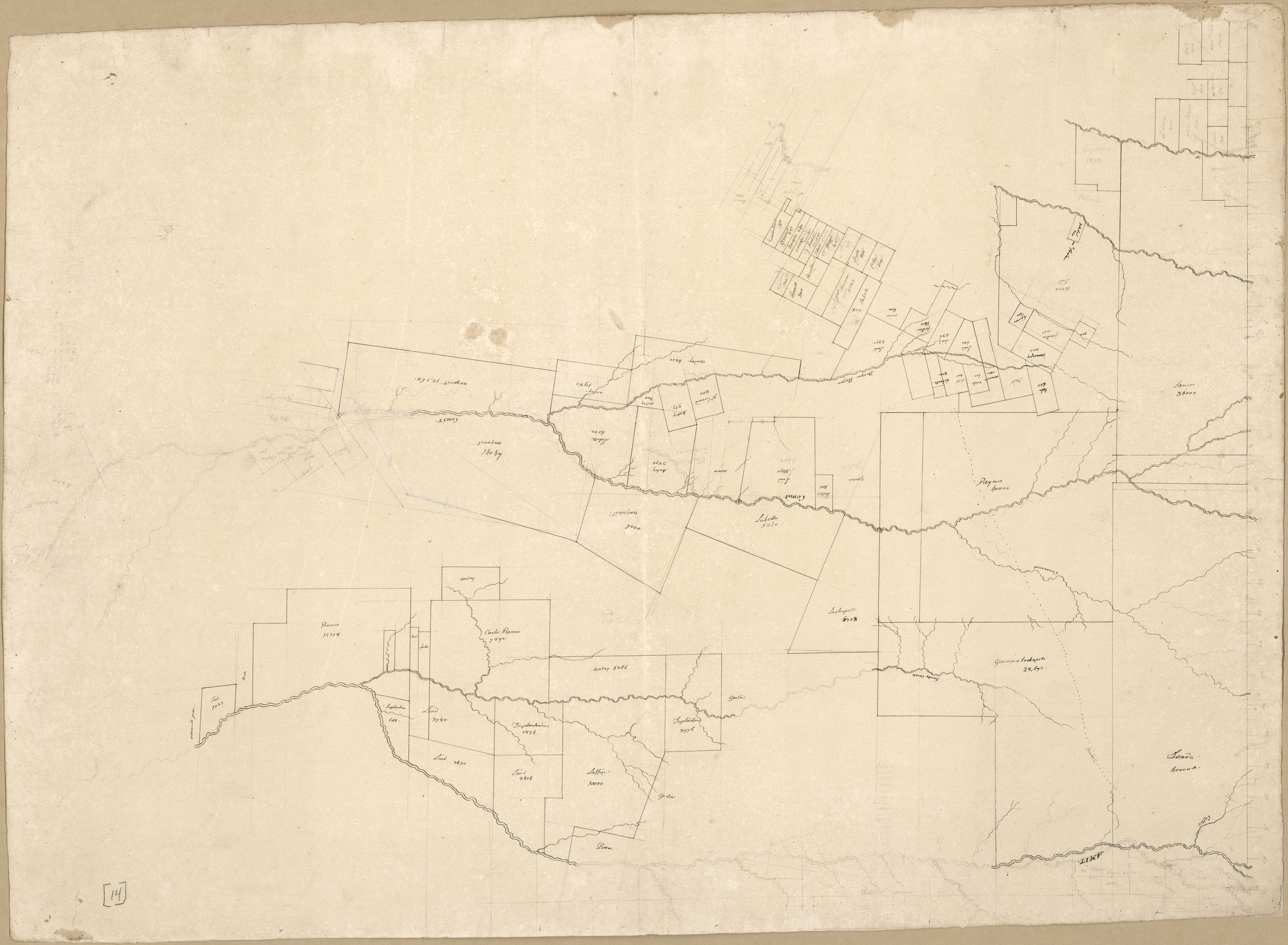
Map of Spanish West Florida by Pintado.

Pintado served as assistant surveyor of Spanish West Florida from 1803 to 1805. Recognized by the Spanish authorities for his ability in this office, Pintado was named surveyor general of West Florida on October 9, 1805, his appointment being confirmed on December 13. Carlos Trudeau, the surveyor general of Louisiana, had previously been selected for the position, but because of his advanced age and family ties in Louisiana, refused a relocation to Pensacola. Trudeau and his former assistant Pintado divided possession all maps, plats and documents pertaining to official land measurements, Pintado keeping those related to the Floridas and Trudeau those concerning Louisiana.

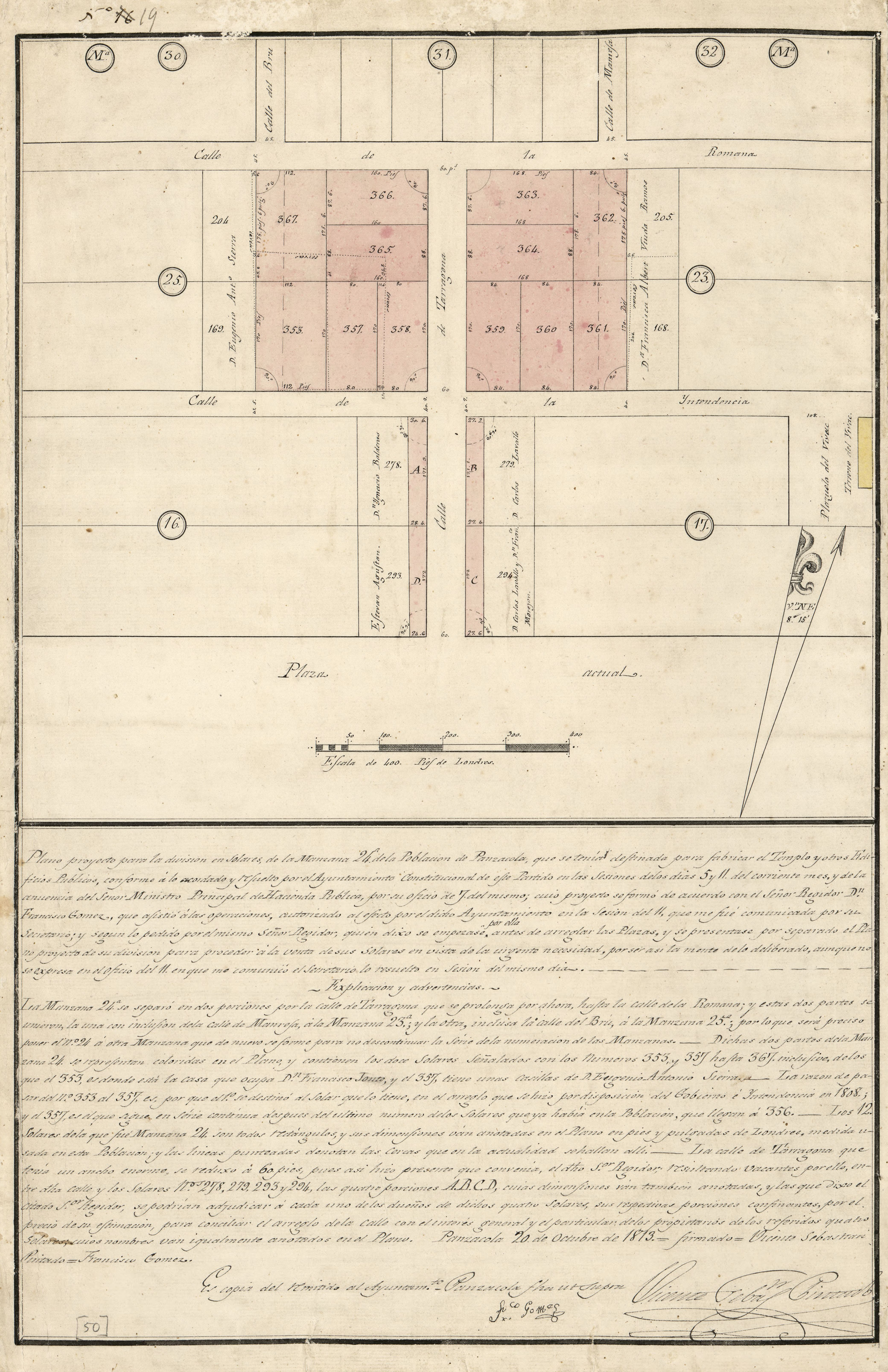
Copy of the Pintado Plan of Pensacola, showing the division of solares in the town

The Cortes of Cádiz issued a royal order on October 28, 1812, awarding Pintado the title of Captain of Infantry, which made him a full army officer. In the same year, a decree by the Spanish authorities mandated the renaming of plazas and streets in Pensacola, as well the construction of a new church and government buildings. Consequently, Pintado elaborated a street map of the town, the so-called "Pintado plan", which later received the approval of the city council on December 7, 1813.

Manrique's letter to Cochrane on January 25, 1815 sought the return of the runaway Spanish slaves who had sought refuge with Colonel Edward Nicolls. Writing from HMS Royal Oak, off Mobile Bay, on March 15, 1815, Rear Admiral Pulteney Malcolm, Cochrane's subordinate commander of the Mobile Squadron, assured Mateo González Manrique that Post-Captain Robert Cavendish Spencer (a son of George Spencer, 2nd Earl Spencer) of HMS Carron, had been detailed to conduct a strict enquiry into the conduct of Nicolls and Woodbine, regarding the property losses of Spanish inhabitants of Florida. Malcolm believed that in cases where formerly enslaved persons could not be persuaded to return to their owners, the British government would undertake to remunerate the owners.

Alexander Cochrane had set the precedent that the fugitive slaves could not be returned by force to the Spanish. (Note: Cochrane's letter to Manrique, composed on the Tonnant, off Mobile February 10, 1815 does state: 'Situated as I am with so few white Troops at Appalachicola it would be attended with much hazard the making use of forcible measures [of returning the Spanish slave fugitives] which accordingly I must entirely decline.' The original transcript is stored within: Letters from Commander-in-Chief, North America: 1815, nos. 1–126 (ADM 1/508)) Even before this, the same rationale was mentioned in Robert Henry's communication to Manrique, dated January 12, which puts forward the same argument that the armed men of the Corps of Colonial Marines outnumbered their European counterparts by a ratio of five to one. Urcullo concurred, and mentioned this in his report to Manrique dated January 23, 1815.

Pintado traveled to Havana, where he met Cochrane aboard his flagship Tonnant on February 28. On March 1, 1815, Pintado, his servant and Dr Eugenio Sierra embarked HMS Brazen for conveyance to Apalachicola Bay, to meet with Spencer. Pintado and his entourage, now joined by William McPherson as representative ("Majordomo") of John Forbes and Company, traveled to Apalachicola, Florida, accompanied by Spencer aboard HMS Carron, which he embarked on March 15 at Pensacola, and arrived on March 27. (Note: Enclosure 8 to Erving. Memorandum of a gentleman of respectability at Bermuda, dated 21 May 1815 "Admiral Cochrane, however, appears to have disapproved of Nicholls's conduct in affording protection to the Spanish slaves, and had sent the Hon. Captain Spencer to Pensacola for the purpose of making arrangements for their restoration; who accordingly proceeded to Appalachicola, with Captain Pintado, named commissioner on the part of the Spaniards.") Pintado and his two companions stayed at Apalachicola, while Spencer traveled to Prospect Bluff. He sent two letters dated March 31 and April 2 respectively, and then a third letter dated April 4, requesting their presence at Prospect Bluff, 20 miles up river, where they arrived on April 7.

The condition of their visitation was that they could not forcibly make the fugitives return to slavery, they had to persuade them to do so voluntarily, observed Pintado. In a few instances, when a fugitive slave was being interrogated by Spencer and Pintado, and had the impression they would be taken away by force, the reaction was to either head into the forest or threaten retaliatory violence, noted Pintado. He commented that Spencer would warn the fugitive that if they were to remain, upon the imminent departure of the British they would lose their protection, 'explaining to them the danger in which they were in of being caught by the Indians and delivered to their masters in hope of receiving a reward from them.' Pintado interviewed Spanish slaves, he was able to persuade only 10, all women, to return voluntarily. He estimated 250 runaways to be present. (His colleague Dr Sierra had 128 on his list.) Pintado was disembarked from HMS Cydnus at Pensacola on April 27. His correspondence from April 29, 1815 was sent to the new governor, José de Soto, who now succeeded Manrique.

Following the conclusion of this expedition, Pintado once again turned his attention to surveying and drew several maps. He drew a map of the territory stretching from Mobile, Alabama to the Apalachee Bay. His map of the Apalachicola River area was based on what he had observed whilst undertaking his diplomatic mission at Prospect Bluff.

Pintado continued serving as surveyor general until 1817, at which time he was transferred to Havana, Cuba.

=== In Havana ===
In Havana, Pintado continued to issue certificates of surveys for land in West Florida and Louisiana, given that he possessed the West Florida land registry archives. He was no longer undertaking Surveyor General duties, but was employed as an engineer until his death 12 years later.

James Grant Forbes, tasked with transitioning Florida from a Spanish colony to a U.S. territory, wrote to U.S. Secretary of State John Quincy Adams on June 25, 1821. He had spoken with Pintado in Havana, who made it clear that he would only hand over the archive upon payment of a large sum. He noted that his colleague Trudeau had been paid $20,000 for the equivalent documents pertaining to Louisiana. In a letter from Jackson - the military governor of the Florida Territory - to Adams dated July 30, 1821, the same complaint is made of 'the failure to obtain the archives', noting the risk of fraudulent land claims on antedated titles. On August 25, 1822, the Commissioners for the Adjudicators of land claims in Florida wrote to Adams about the same issue. (Note: 'The late Surveyor General Don Vincente [sic] Sebastian Pintado has retained in his possession the record of his proceedings; and individual claimants are subjected to the payment of enormous sums for copies and exemplifications.')

In 1822, the Captain General of Cuba, Nicolas Mahy, ordered Pintado to prepare a file containing descriptions of all distributions of land, including solares and water rights, made in both the Floridas under the administration of the Spanish government from 1801 - 1818. Pintado completed this project in 1823. A copy was handed over to the American authorities as part of Article II of the Treaty of 1819. In April 1828, the American minister in Madrid, Alexander Hill Everett, asked Spanish Secretary of State Manuel González Salmón for a copy of Pintado's work.

The following April, the Spanish Minister Francisco Tacón wrote from Philadelphia that United States Secretary of State Martin van Buren had requested a copy of Pintado's work, consisting of 120 items concerning the distribution and granting of land in the Floridas (1808–18), certified in Havana. The request was honored, and Tacón replied.

Pintado remained in Havana, retaining his original copy of the file despite the claims of the Americans. In 1829, aware of his failing health, he informed his wife Eulalia Balderas of the existence of these papers, and told her that in case of his death, she should not copy or give information about them to anyone, except in exchange for money to support the family, including their four children.

Pintado died in Havana on August 20, 1829.

== Personal life ==
In 1816, when Pintado was 42 years old, he married a native of Louisiana, Maria Teresa Eulalia Balderas y Dubuisson, whose father, Ignacio Balderas (born in Salamanca, Spain) had served with Pintado in Pensacola as captain of Infantry of the Regimiento de Infantería Fijo de Luisiana. They had four children.

== After his death ==
In 1830, Pintado's widow sold the exclusive file to land speculators in Louisiana, Florida and Missouri. Apparently the American government had refused to pay the $15,000 she demanded, so she sold them to the highest bidders. After Pintado's death, his widow sold the papers to Rezin Bowie and John Wilson for $24,500 (the United States declined to pay the high price). As noted by J. R. Hébert PhD, in 1841 General John Wilson was in possession of these documents, comprising 62 maps and plats bound in a leather portfolio addressed to "John Wilson".

== Legacy: The Pintado Collection ==
In 1974, the Pintado collection was donated to the Library of Congress in Washington, D.C. The assemblage consists of about 1,500 items, including "correspondence, bills of sale, court transcripts, testimonies, surveys, notebooks, plats, land grants, maps, petitions, and other papers relating principally to Pintado's duties as mayor, commandant, and surveyor general. Among these papers are records of properties and land in West Florida from the Mississippi River in Louisiana to the Pearl River (today the dividing line between the states of Mississippi and Louisiana), north of Lake Pontchartrain and the Gulf region in the present states of Mississippi, Alabama and Florida. The documents were compiled by Pintado during the sale of Louisiana, the occupation of West Florida by the British (1813–14) and the transfer of the Floridas by Spain to the United States in 1819, crucial years in the history of the region.

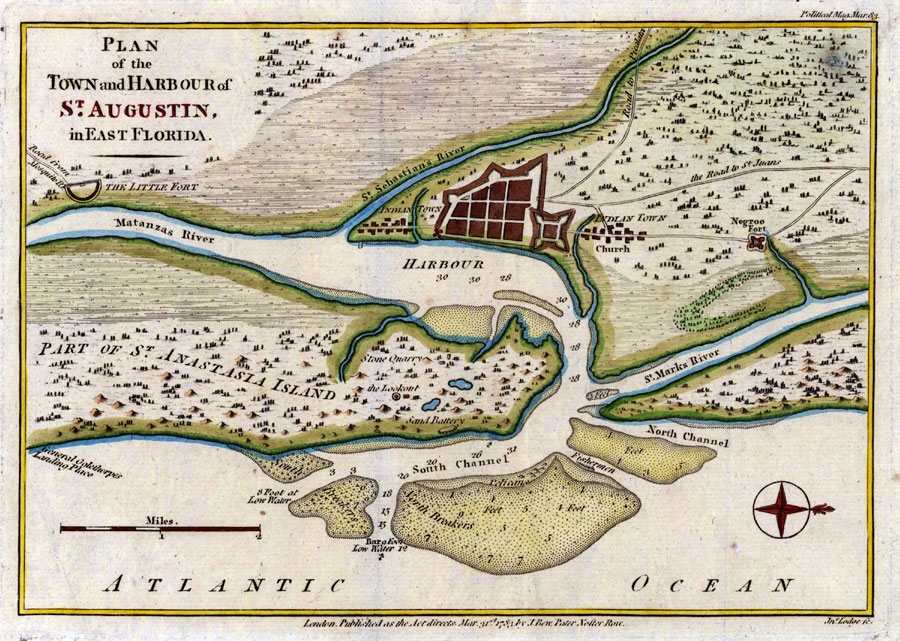
Plan of the town and harbour of St. Augustine in East Florida, 1783, by Tomas Lopez

Of the 62 maps and plats in the Pintado Collection, 15 were drawn by Pintado himself. The remaining maps, plats, and cadastres were made by assistants under his supervision, and focus mainly on the regions around Baton Rouge, New Feliciana, Mobile and Pensacola, as well as Apalachicola Bay, which divided the two Floridas (West Florida extended to the Mississippi River). The collection also includes a copy of a plan made by the famous Spanish cartographer Tomás López, a map of the city and port of Saint Augustine, Florida, made in 1783.

Most of the papers are dated between 1799–1817, the period in which Pintado served as mayor and commander of New Feliciana near Baton Rouge, and later as Surveyor General of West Florida. Few of the Pintado documents date before 1799, and none of the official documents are dated after 1817, although there are applications for certificates of land grants in Louisiana and West Florida.

== Additional archival materials ==
In the P. K. Yonge Library of Florida History, Special Collections, George A. Smathers Libraries, University of Florida, Gainesville, Florida, in the collection "Pioneer Days in Florida", there is a smaller collection of Pintado material: "Official records and correspondence of Vicente Sebastian Pintado, from 1817 to 1837. The letters and certifications in the collection pertain to land grants in Pensacola, Florida, and the liquidation of the estate of former Louisiana and West Florida Intendant Juan Ventura Morales. Also included is a lengthy diligencia on Pintado's own lands in Pensacola and an inventory of settlers who received land grants from the Spanish Crown."
