= HMS Childers (1812) =

Brig of the Royal Navy

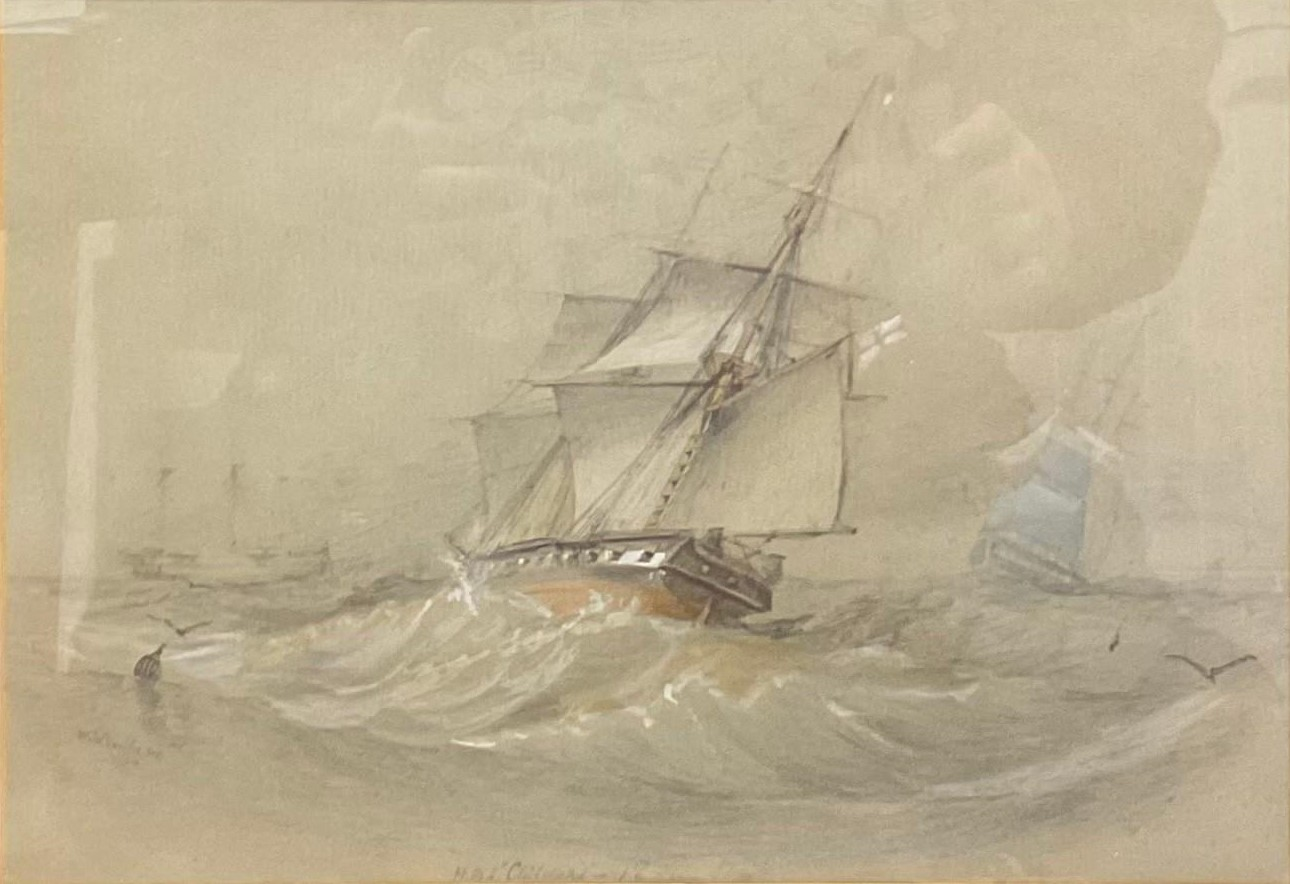
- Childers

History

United Kingdom
- Name: HMS Childers
- Ordered: 19 January 1811
- Builder: Nicholas Diddams, Portsmouth Dockyard
- Laid down: August 1811
- Launched: 9 July 1812
- Commissioned: 22 August 1812
- Fate: Broken up 1822

General characteristics
- Class & type: Cruizer-class brig-sloop
- Tons burthen: 38351/94 (bm)
- Length: 100 ft 1 in (30.5 m) o/a; 77 ft 3 1/2 in (23.6 m) (keel)
- Beam: 30 ft 6 1/2 in (9.3 m)
- Depth of hold: 12 ft 10 in (3.9 m)
- Sail plan: Brig
- Complement: 121
- Armament: 16 × 32-pounder carronades; 2 × 6-pounder bow guns

HMS Childers was a Royal Navy 18-gun Cruizer-class brig-sloop that Nicholas Diddams built at Portsmouth Dockyard and launched in 1812. She was broken up in 1822.

== Royal Navy service ==
Commander Buckland Bluett commissioned Childers in July 1812. When news of the outbreak of the War of 1812 reached Britain, the Royal Navy seized all American vessels then in British ports. Childers was among the 42 Royal Navy vessels then lying at Spithead or Portsmouth and so entitled to share in the grant for the American ships Belleville, Janus, Aeos, Ganges and Leonidas seized there on 31 July 1812. (Note: A first-class share was worth £20 19s 0d; a sixth-class share, that of an ordinary seaman, was worth 4s 1d; the Commander in Chief received £230 10s 8d.)

Commander John Bedford replaced Bluett in August and sailed for the Leeward Islands on 29 September. On 3 November she captured the American schooner Snapper, along with Acasta, Aeolus and Maidstone. Snapper was a privateer of 172 tons, out of Philadelphia. She carried 11 guns and had a crew of 90 men under the command of Captain J. Green. (Note: A first-class share of the prize money was worth £20 8s 11d; a sixth-class share was worth 2s 11d.) That same day Childers captured the brig Isabella, which was sailing from New York to Puerto Rico. Some six weeks later, on 16 December, Childers captured the brig Baltimore, which was on her way to Bermuda.

From December 1813 onwards, she was under Commander John Brand Umfreville.

For the rest of the conflict, she was with a flotilla of ships operating off the Gulf coast. (Note: 'The Childers having joined me [at Pensacola] on the 6th [September 1814] from New Providence with a further supply of arms, ammunition etc for the Indians as also a small supply of flour for the squadron.') In September 1814, she took part in the first, unsuccessful attack on Fort Bowyer. (Note: Arsene Latour mistakenly named Anaconda as the fourth vessel present during the Battle of Fort Bowyer, rather than Childers, and this error has persisted in some accounts. James, in mentioning the many inaccuracies of Latour's book in relation to the failed attack on Fort Bowyer, does refer to Latour 'misnaming one vessel'.) The final contribution was to embark a field piece, some sick marines and provisions, to allow the remaining marines to march to Pensacola without hindrances, which was appreciated by the artillery officer. (Note: '[Our artillery detachment] retreated about four miles... he recommended our retreating to Pensacola on this I did not hesitate to embark the howitzer which the lieut. of the Childers handsomely offered to take to the schooner, together with about seven or eight sick men, and such provisions, as was not convenient for men to carry on the March.') For much of the autumn, Carron was at Pensacola, until General Andrew Jackson's numerically superior land forces expelled the British flotilla after the battle of Pensacola at the start of November 1814.

On 27 January 1815 Childers left Nassau, Bahamas, escorting a convoy heading to Britain, Childers moored at Bermuda the following week. On 21 May Childers departed Bermuda, and arrived at Portsmouth on 23 June 1815.

Commander Richard Wales assumed command in October 1815, in the Leeward Islands. Lieutenant Edward W. Corry Astley (acting) assumed command in September 1816 while Wales was ill, giving up command on Wales's return. During Astley's command, yellow fever attacked the crew of Childers, forcing him to bring her into English Harbour, Antigua, with only 15 men available for duty. According to The Naval Chronicle, within a month she lost over 35 officers and men dead from fever.

In January 1817 Commander Amos Freeman Westropp assumed command.

== Fate ==
Childers was broken up at Chatham on 7 March 1822.
