= Borodino (1813 ship) =

History

United Kingdom
- Name: Borodino
- Namesake: Borodino
- Owner: 1813:Row or Row & Co.; 1830:Redman
- Builder: Laing & Co, South Shields
- Launched: 25 February 1813
- Fate: Wrecked 7 February 1830

General characteristics
- Tons burthen: 309, or 3139/94 (bm)
- Length: 96 ft 0 in (29.3 m)
- Beam: 28 ft 8 in (8.7 m)
- Armament: 8 × 18-pounder carronades

Borodino was launched in 1813 at South Shields. She served as a government transport and was wrecked in 1830.

== Career ==
Borodino first entered the Register of Shipping (RS) in 1813 with Spurs, master, Row, owner, and trade London transport.

Borodino first entered Lloyd's Register in 1820 with Marshall, master, Row, owner, and trade Cork.

There are references in online resources of the "Borodino transport" carrying troops and supplies for the British government, sometimes to or from as far as India.

On 13 March 1821 Borodino arrived at Gravesend with Commander John Furneaux, his officers, and 15 of the crew of HMS Carron, which had wrecked on the India coast between Bengal and Madras on 6 July 1820. Borodino had come from Trincomalee via the Cape of Good Hope and Saint Helena.

On 10 August 1823, R. William Horton wrote from London to Lord Charles Somerset, Governor of the Cape Colony, South Africa, that Borodino, of 309 tons, would shortly be dispatched to the Cape to carry two companies of men of the disbanded Royal African Corps from the Cape to Sierra Leone. Then on 24 March 1824, a detachment of European troops, four officers and 130 men, arrived at Freetown from the Cape.

On 24 August 1825 Borodino carried two companies of the 32nd Regiment of Foot from Corfu to England. The regiment was rotating out of the Ionian Islands. The two companies disembarked on 17 November.

On 27 May 1826 detachments of the 52nd and 81st Regiments of Infantry, embarked on the Borodino transport at Portsmouth, for Halifax. On 22 September she returned, arriving at Portsmouth on 13 October, having been six weeks going to Halifax and three weeks returning.

Lloyd's Register for 1830 showed Borodino with Killick, master, Redman, owner, and trade London–Sierra Leone.

== Fate ==
While Borodino was at Sierra Leone, she lost her captain, mate, and most of her crew to disease.

Later in 1829 Borodino sailed for London under Captain Haines and in mid-January arrived in St Mary's Roads, Isles of Scilly, leaking and with lost sails and bulwarks. On 7 February 1830, while still awaiting sufficient improvement in the weather to reach Milford Haven, Borodino lost both anchors in a gale and was driven onto the Carn Morvel Rock, St Mary's. Her crew were rescued and, after the weather moderated, a great part of her cargo of African oak and other goods was saved.

The Register of Shipping (1831), had the annotation "Lost" by her name.
