= Solar (Spanish term) =

In Spanish urban development a solar is a plot of land that meets minimum conditions to be built on and developed properly according to existing land use regulations. These conditions relate primarily to water supply and access to the electrical grid, disposal or purification of wastewater and road access.

The specific characteristics required for such a plot to be considered a "solar" are set for each Spanish Autonomous Region based on these criteria. During the Spanish colonization of the Americas, the solar was one of the basic units into which cities were divided; solares were assigned when a new settlement was founded.

== See also ==
- Chacra
- Ejido
- Hacienda
- Manzana (unit)
