= Robert Cavendish Spencer =

English naval officer and noble

Captain The Honourable Sir Robert Cavendish Spencer KCH
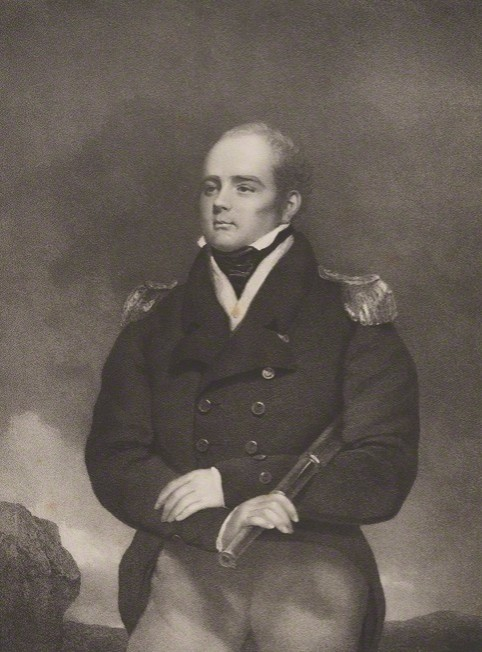
- Sir Robert Cavendish Spencer
- Born: 24 October 1791; England
- Died: 4 November 1830 (aged 39); Off Alexandria, Egypt
- Parents: George Spencer (father); Lavinia Bingham (mother)
- Relatives: John Spencer (brother); Frederick Spencer (brother); George Spencer (brother); Sarah Lyttelton (sister)
- Military career
- Service: Royal Navy
- Units: HMS Tigre; HMS Malta; HMS Espoir; HMS Carron
- Commands: HMS Pelorus; HMS Kite; HMS Cydnus; HMS Ganymede; HMS Owen Glendower; HMS Naiad; HMS Madagascar

Sir Robert Cavendish Spencer KCH (24 October 1791 – 4 November 1830) was an English officer of the Royal Navy. Well-connected by birth, he made a naval career, which attracted the sons of the nobility and also of those from naval backgrounds, to serve under him and, despite liberal politics, worked as a reforming administrator with the future William IV of the United Kingdom.

== Life ==
Born on 24 October 1791, he was the third son of George Spencer, 2nd Earl Spencer, and brother of John Spencer, 3rd Earl Spencer, Frederick Spencer, 4th Earl Spencer, George Spencer, and Sarah Lyttelton. In August 1804 he entered the navy on board HMS Tigre with Captain Benjamin Hallowell, and served under him, in Tigre and afterwards in HMS Malta—being promoted to be lieutenant on 13 December 1810—till appointed to command the brig HMS Pelorus, in October 1812. On 22 January 1813 Spencer was promoted to be commander of HMS Kite, from which he was moved into HMS Espoir, one of the squadron off Marseille, under the command of Captain Thomas Ussher.

On 19 January 1814, he was appointed to HMS Carron, stationed on the coast of North America; and was promoted to post rank by the Commander-in-Chief, North American Station, on 4 June 1814. He was engaged in operations against Fort Bowyer in September 1814. and New Orleans. Captain Spencer was mentioned in dispatches for his part in reconnoitering the Bayou Catalan, so as to determine a suitable location for British forces to disembark, in order to attack New Orleans. (Note: Letter from Cochrane to the Admiralty, dated 18 January 1815.) (Note: Letter from Keane to Pakenham, dated 26 December 1814.) He headed to Fort Bowyer for a second time in February 1815. Spencer was among the sailors who landed near Mobile, and was second in command of the Naval party.

As per the letter sent by Rear Admiral Pulteney Malcolm to the Spanish Governor Manrique dated 15 March 1815, Spencer had been detailed to conduct a strict enquiry as a third party, regarding the property losses of Spanish inhabitants of Florida, specifically Spanish fugitive slaves who had fled their owners to the company of Edward Nicolls and George Woodbine. Spencer did not share Nicolls's abolitionist stance and was genuinely attempting to do his job. Rear Admiral Malcolm believed that in cases where formerly enslaved persons could not be persuaded to return to their owners, the British government would undertake to remunerate the owners. His counterpart Vicente Sebastián Pintado embarked the Carron at Pensacola on 15 March, and arrived at Apalachicola on 27 March. Spencer travelled alone 20 miles north to Prospect Bluff, then sent for Pintado and his party, they arriving there on 7 April. (Note: Enclosure 8 to Erving. Memorandum of a gentleman of respectability at Bermuda, dated 21 May 1815 "Admiral Cochrane, however, appears to have disapproved of Nicholls's conduct in affording protection to the Spanish slaves, and had sent the Hon. Captain Spencer to Pensacola for the purpose of making arrangements for their restoration; who accordingly proceeded to Appalachicola, with Captain Pintado, named commissioner on the part of the Spaniards.") The enquiry was in addition to two activities he was originally tasked with by Cochrane on 25 February 1815, delivering needed provisions, and investigating the Prospect Bluff garrison's debts.

Cochrane had set the precedence that the fugitive slaves could not be returned by force to the Spanish. (Note: Cochrane's letter to Manrique, composed on the Tonnant, off Mobile February 10, 1815 does state: 'Situated as I am with so few white Troops at Appalachicola it would be attended with much hazard the making use of forcible measures [of returning the Spanish slave fugitives] which accordingly I must entirely decline.' The original transcript is stored within: Letters from Commander-in-Chief, North America: 1815, nos. 1–126 (ADM 1/508)) Even before this, the same rationale was mentioned in Robert Henry's communication to Manrique, dated 12 January, which puts forward the same argument that the armed men of the Corps of Colonial Marines outnumbered their European counterparts by a ratio of five to one. Urcullo concurred, and mentioned this in his report to Manrique dated 23 January 1815.

Prior to meeting Pintado, Spencer's letter to Rear Admiral Malcolm, dated 12 March 1815 stated that 'all persuasive means of getting them back [to their slaveowners] have been tried and have failed'. The previous day, Spencer's colleague Robert Gamble warned Rear Admiral Malcolm of his concerns that ‘from the claims that have been put in, I feel we shall be detained at Apalachicola much longer than we expected’. In April 1815, Spencer spent much of that month at Prospect Bluff on the Apalachicola River, its garrison comprising primarily Britain's Red Stick Indian allies in part, but also the fugitive slaves, with whom he was charged with settling their claims and dismissing them from British service in the Corps of Colonial Marines. (Note: Whilst contemporary biographies refer to 'our Indian allies', he was there to defuse diplomatic tensions regarding Spanish slaveowner claims.) Spencer would not allow the runaway Spanish slaves to be returned by force. Innerarity mentions that Spencer 'expostulated with, encouraged, threatened, advised and did every thing short of... the application of force'. Pintado noted that Spencer would warn the fugitive that if they were to remain, upon the imminent departure of the British they would lose their protection, 'explaining to them the danger in which they were in of being caught by the Indians and delivered to their masters in hope of receiving a reward from them.' In a few instances, when a fugitive slave was being interrogated by Spencer and Pintado, and had the impression they would be taken away by force, the reaction was to either head into the forest or threaten retaliatory violence, noted Pintado. Lieutenant Colonel Edward Nicolls received orders to withdraw his troops from the fort at Prospect Bluff. (Note: A letter from Spencer to Cochrane dated 17 February 1816 does mention that 'The 28th March [1815 of] last [year] I found collected there the major part of the Creek Chiefs... These [tribal] kings were actually receiveing[sic] from us presents, pay and obeying Brevet Major Nicolls' orders until 22 April [1815]', whereupon Spencer sailed away.)

In accordance with Cochrane's orders, Cydnus was moored off Prospect Bluff. Sir Alexander Cochrane appointed Spencer to command Cydnus on 19 April 1815, for his efforts in Louisiana and Florida, as Captain Frederick Langford died on 17 February 1815 whilst in the Gulf of Mexico. Cydnus embarked the Royal Marine detachment on 22 April, moored at Pensacola on 27 April to disembark Pintado, arriving at Bermuda on 13 June 1815. Cydnus next sailed to Halifax, arriving on 24 June 1815. He was in attendance at the court martial of Robert Falcon, his officers and men for the loss of HMS Cyane, which took place on board Akbar at Halifax on 28 June 1815.

He left the North America and West Indies Station and arrived in Portsmouth on 22 December 1815. In 1815 Spencer commanded HMS Cydnus on the home station, and in 1817–1819 the 26-gun frigate HMS Ganymede in the Mediterranean, where he conducted a negotiation with the Bey of Tunis. From 1819 to 1822, he commanded HMS Owen Glendower on the South American station, and from 1823 to 1826, the 46-gun frigate HMS Naiad in the Mediterranean, where he took part in the operations against Algiers in the summer of 1824. He was then employed on the coast of Greece, during the Greek War of Independence.

From August 1827 to September 1828, Spencer was private secretary and Groom of the Bedchamber to the Duke of Clarence, then Lord High Admiral. They worked on naval reform in the areas of gunnery and steam power. In October 1828, he was nominated Knight Commander of the Royal Guelphic Order, and was knighted on 24 November. In September 1828 he was appointed to command HMS Madagascar, again serving in the Mediterranean.

== Death ==
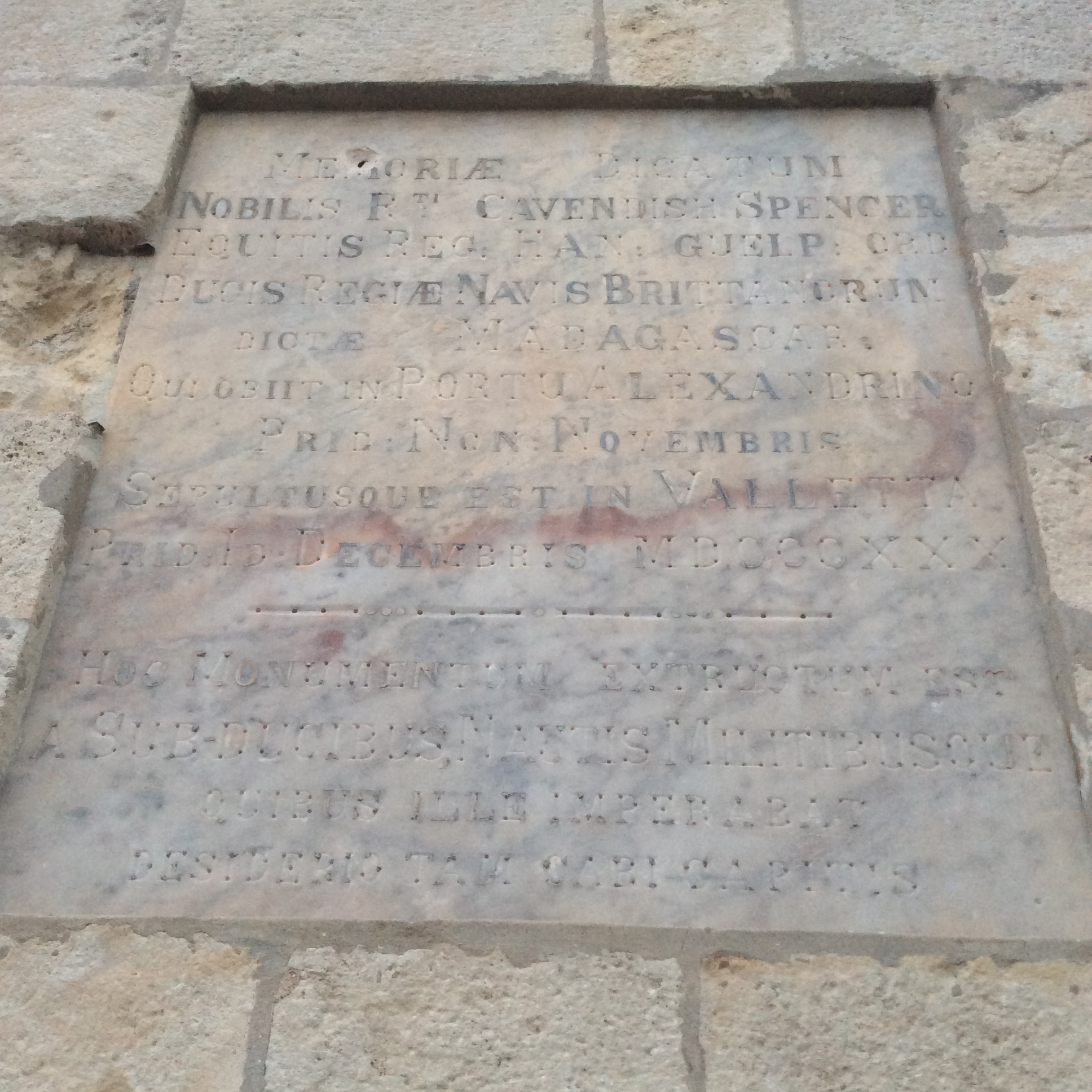
Inscription on the Spencer Monument, Malta

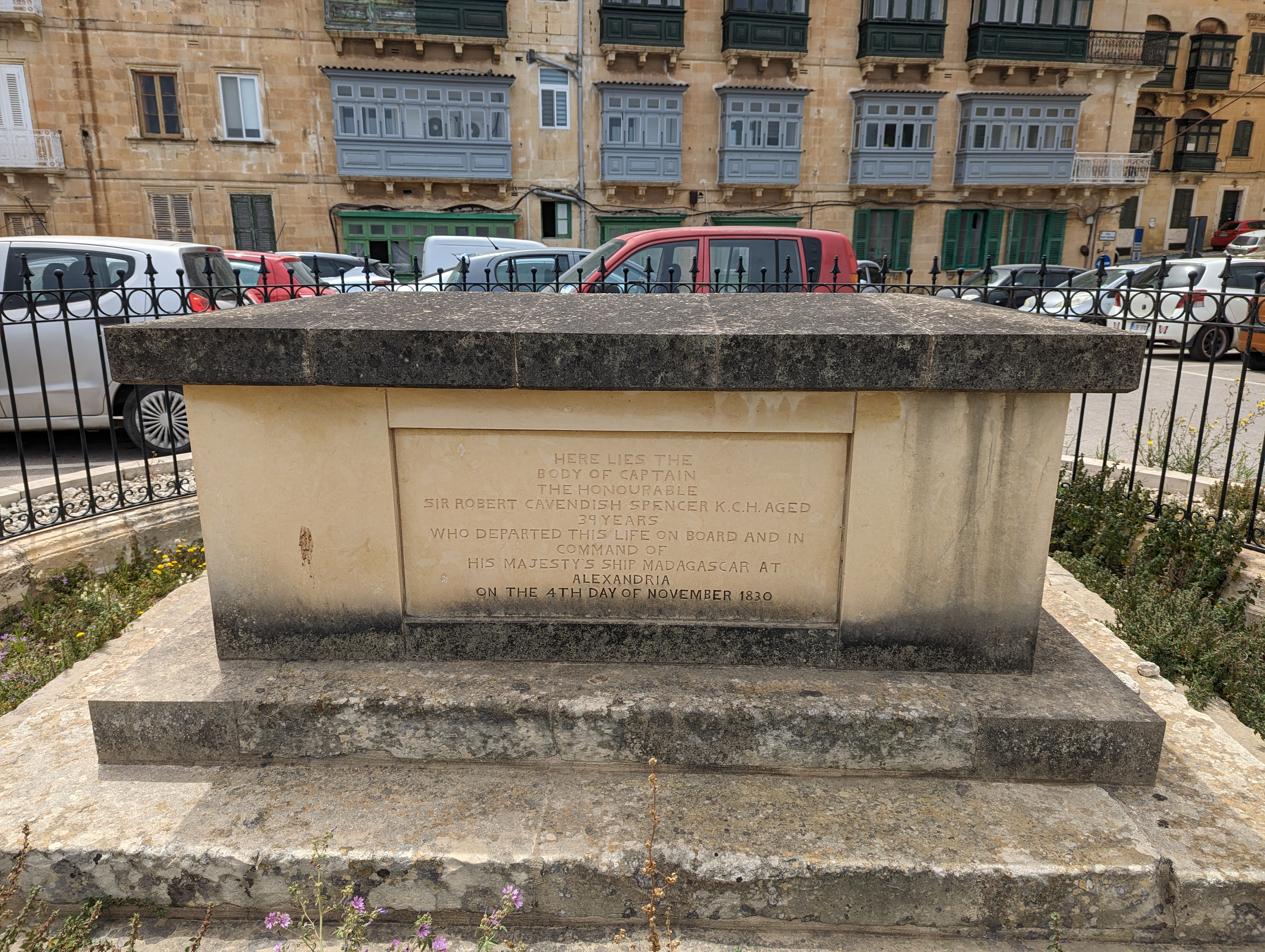
Spencer's tomb, Spencer's Bastion, Valletta, Malta

Spencer died, off Alexandria, on 4 November 1830; he had just been recalled to the United Kingdom as surveyor-general of the ordnance. He was unmarried. He was buried in Malta. A memorial to his memory was erected in Great Brington sculpted by Francis Chantrey.
