= Fort Bowyer =

- Location within Alabama
- 30°13′41″N 88°1′23″W
- Location: Western terminus of AL 180; Gasque, Alabama

History
- Built: 1813

Fort Bowyer was a short-lived earthen and stockade fortification that the United States Army erected in 1813 on Mobile Point, near the mouth of Mobile Bay in what is now Baldwin County, Alabama, but then was part of the Mississippi Territory. The British twice attacked the fort during the War of 1812.

The first attack took place in September 1814; unsuccessful, it led to the British changing their strategy and attacking New Orleans. The second attack, following the Battle of New Orleans, was successful. It took place in February 1815, after the Treaty of Ghent had been signed but before the news had reached that part of America. Between 1819 and 1834 the United States built a new masonry fortification, Fort Morgan, on the site of Fort Bowyer.

== Construction ==
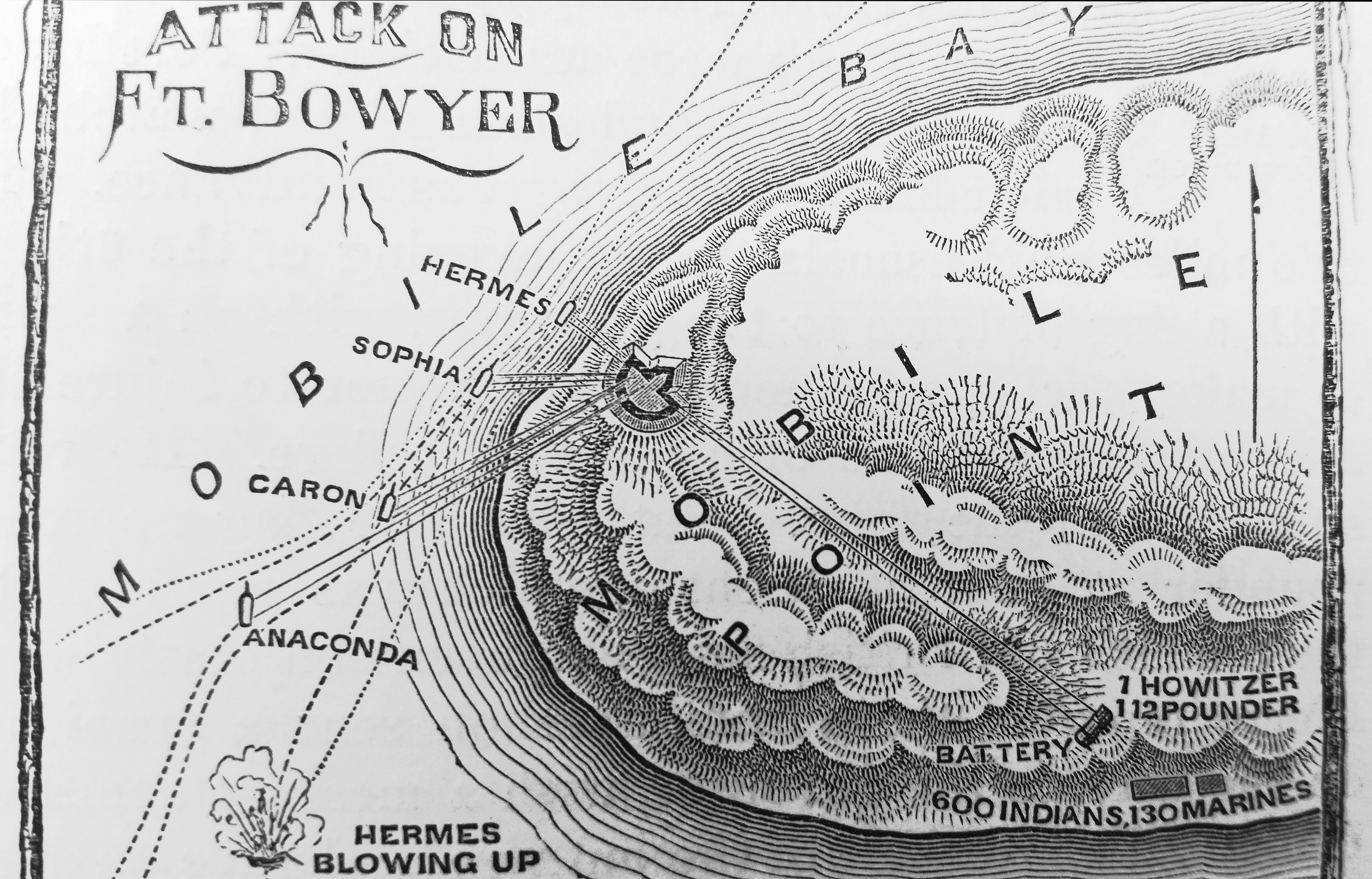
Fort Bowyer, mistakenly showing HMS Anaconda instead of HMS Childers

Mobile had been a Spanish possession before the beginning of the Patriot War, but Congress had declared it American territory after the War of 1812 started. After Spanish forces evacuated Mobile in April 1813, the Americans built a redoubt on Mobile Point.

In June 1813, Colonel John Bowyer completed the fort. The fort, which initially had 14 guns, was made of sand and logs and fan-shaped, with the curved face facing the ship channel into Mobile Bay. On the landward side there was a bastion, flanked by two demi-bastions. The fort's purpose was to impede any British invasion at this point on the Gulf Coast, as the fort commanded the narrow entrance to Mobile Bay. About a year after the fort's construction, the Americans abandoned it, but in August 1814, Major William Lawrence and 160 men from the 2nd U.S. Infantry re-garrisoned it.

== First battle ==
First Battle of Fort Bowyer
- Part of War of 1812
Date	September 14–16, 1814
Location	Fort Bowyer, Mississippi Territory
Result	American victory

Belligerents
United Kingdom	United States

Commanders and leaders
William Percy; Edward Nicolls (WIA)	William Lawrence

Strength
British: 60 Royal Marines, 1 artillery piece, 2 sixth-rates, 2 brig-sloops Native Americans: ~60 warriors Total: ~120 troops (Note: Embarked as supernumeraries are: 58 warriors & 21 marines on HMS Carron, with 29 marines and 12 marine artillerymen on HMS Childers. James refers to 60 marines and 120 indians, based on Percy's letter sent prior to departing Pensacola. This is a lower figure than the 130 marines and 600 indians in contemporary American accounts such as that of Major Arsène Latour's Historical Memoir of the War in West Florida and Louisiana in 1814-15. James refers to Latour 'misnaming one vessel'. The complements of Hermes, Sophie, Carron, and Childers were 135, 121, c.135, and 121 respectively.)	160 infantry, 6–14 artillery pieces (disputed),

Casualties and losses
34 killed, 35 wounded 1 decapitated 2 captured 1 sixth-rate scuttled, 1 brig-sloop damaged	4 killed, 5+ wounded

The First Battle of Fort Bowyer took place in mid-September, 1814. Captain William Percy of the Royal Navy decided to attack the fort in preparation for an assault on Mobile. He believed Bowyer to be a low, wooden battery mounting some six to 14 small caliber guns. (Note: 'I have been able to obtain that it is a low wood battery of little strength, mounting at the most fourteen Guns of small Calibre en barbette; though others state the number only at six.' Taken from letter from Percy to Cochrane, dated September 9, 1814, archive reference ADM 1/505 folios 152–55, reproduced in a secondary source)

=== Background ===
Capturing the fort would enable the British to move on Mobile and thereby block Louisiana's trade. From Mobile, the British could move overland to Natchez to cut off New Orleans from the north.

Percy took with him HMS Hermes (22 guns), HMS Sophie (18 guns), HMS Carron (20 guns; Captain Robert Cavendish Spencer), and a fourth vessel, HMS Childers (18 guns; Capt. Umfreville). (Note: The Louisiana State Museum has a map of the battle showing the fourth vessel as Anaconda, rather than Childers. American sources often mis-attributed the fourth vessel as HMS Anaconda, of 18 guns. Lossing contains a map that shows the tracks of the vessels. Lossing's map is probably based on the map in the possession of the Louisiana State Museum.) Lieutenant Colonel Edward Nicolls volunteered to proceed with diversionary forces on land. (Note: Marshall quotes a letter from Percy to Cochrane, dated September 9, 1814, that states, "[Nicolls] volunteered to proceed with a party of about 60 marines and 130 Indians; I shall sail tomorrow or next day, after embarking them.")

On the morning of September 12, Percy landed Nicolls's force of 60 Royal Marines, (Note: The muster from HMS Childers shows that she carried 29 marines and 12 marine artillerymen. In addition the muster from HMS Carron shows that she carried 21 marines as supernumeraries, and around 60 native American allies, under the command of Robert Henry (1791–1850). Despite Nicolls having promised 130 Indians, the muster records "Indian Warriors victualled – 58 in number".) (Note: Latour claims that 'the enemy had landed six hundred Indians or Spaniards, and one hundred and thirty marines' but this does not reconcile with the ship musters.) (Note: Roosevelt's observation. 'Latour is the only trustworthy American contemporary historian of this war, and even he at times absurdly exaggerates the British force and loss, Most of the other American "histories" of that period were the most preposterously bombastic works that ever saw print. But as regards this battle, none of them are as bad as even such British historians as Alison... Almost all British writers underestimate their own force and enormously magnify that of the Americans.') and about 60 Indians, together with a 5 1/2-inch howitzer, (Note: The 5 1/2-inch howitzer fired a shell of about 24 pounds. A 24-pounder cannon had a 5.82 inch bore and fired a shot with a diameter of 5.547 inches. The howitzer was much lighter than the gun and used a smaller powder charge, but could produce plunging fire, which a gun could not.) about 9 miles to the eastward. The British land force then marched against the fort and Lawrence's 160 men.

A further sixty Indians, under First Lieutenant James Cassell, had been detached to secure the pass of Bon Secour 27 miles to the east of the fort, but they played no active part in the attack itself.

The American forces in Fort Bowyer, commanded by William Lawrence, consisted of 160 infantry, and a disputed number of cannon (reports range between 6 and 14 guns).

=== Battle ===
The battle began with the Americans repulsing the British land attack on September 14. Nicolls, ill at the time, was observing on Hermes. On September 15, after contrary winds had died down, Percy crossed the bar with Hermes, Sophie, Carron, and Childers. The fort opened fire at 3:20 p.m. and at 3:30 Hermes opened fire. The U.S. fort and Hermes were at musket-shot range. At 3:40, Sophie opened fire also, but the other two vessels were not able to get into a firing position. (Note: Percy records these events occurring one hour later.) During the battle a wooden splinter wounded Nicolls in the eye.

The British naval attack was unsuccessful. After two hours of fruitless bombardment, Hermes ran aground and lay helpless under the fire from the fort. Sophie's boats took off Hermes' crew and Percy set her on fire; she subsequently blew up after the fire reached her magazine. (Note: 'By the Deserters we learn that the ship we have destroyed was the Hermes.' Letter from Lawrence to Jackson dated September 16th.) The remaining ships anchored for the night some one and half miles from the fort.

=== Aftermath ===
The next morning they re-crossed the bar and sailed away. Hermes had lost 17 killed in action, 5 mortally wounded and 19 wounded, while Sophie had 6 killed in action, 4 mortally wounded and 12 wounded, and the Carron had one mortally wounded, and 5 wounded. In all, including the marine killed on shore (Charles Butcher), the British lost 34 killed and 35 wounded in the land and naval attacks, (Note: Latour had estimated British casualties to be 162 killed and 70 wounded, whereas the ship musters record 33 killed in action and died of wounds.) while the Americans lost only four men killed and five or more wounded. Two marines deserted, and were apprehended the following day by Lawrence's men. (Note: Two Royal Marine Privates, William Smith and Michael Brioffer (Brioffaud?) 'who basely deserted to the Enemy') Percy's court-martial for the loss of Hermes concluded that the circumstances had warranted the attack.

The defeat at Fort Bowyer led the British to decide to attack New Orleans instead. However, after their defeat at the Battle of New Orleans, the British decided to try again to take Mobile.

== Second battle ==
Second Battle of Fort Bowyer
- Part of War of 1812
Date	February 7–12, 1815
Location	Fort Bowyer, Mississippi Territory
Result	British victory

Belligerents
United Kingdom	United States

Commanders and leaders
(United Kingdom) John Lambert	(United States) William T. Lawrence (surrendered)

Strength
1,400 infantry, 11 artillery pieces, 3 (estimated) Rocket frames,	370–375 infantry, 22 artillery pieces,

Casualties and losses
13 killed, 18 wounded 17 captured (Note: Includes prisoners taken shortly after the battle by Major Uriah Blue's relief force.)	1 killed, 10 wounded, 374 captured.

The Second Battle of Fort Bowyer was the first step in a British campaign against Mobile, but turned out to be the last land engagement between British and American forces in the War of 1812.

=== Background ===
After the unsuccessful British attack in September 1814, American General Andrew Jackson, recognizing Fort Bowyer's strategic importance, ordered the fort strengthened. (Note: "[Jackson] understood the strategic importance of Mobile and Fort Bowyer".) Now its garrison comprised 370 officers and men of the 2nd Infantry Regiment, and Jackson proclaimed "ten thousand men cannot take it". Despite Jackson's bravado, Lawrence, in command of the fort, described his position as precarious because of the undefended landward approaches to the fort.

Following the defeat at New Orleans, Admiral Cochrane and General John Lambert (replacing Pakenham) received some considerable reinforcements, and then went back to the original plan, before New Orleans, which had been to take Mobile first.

The British troops came from the 4th, 21st, and 44th Regiments of Foot, who had fought at New Orleans. The second Brigade was commanded by Arthur Brooke The commander of the naval forces was Captain T.R. Ricketts of the 74-gun third-rate, HMS Vengeur. Captain Spencer of the Carron was among the sailors landed near Mobile, and was second in command of the naval party. The bomb vessels Aetna and Meteor were present during the siege of Fort Bowyer in February 1815.

When the British captured the fort, they discovered that it mounted three long 32-pounders, eight 24s, six 12s, five 9s, a mortar, and a howitzer. However, Fort Bowyer's weakness was its vulnerability to an attack from the landward side.

=== Battle ===
The British campaign began with an investiture of Fort Bowyer. On 8 February, Lambert landed a force of around 1,000 men seven miles east of the fort. The Royal Engineer Colonel Burgoyne surveyed the fort and decided on the method of attack. That night a 100 yard parallel was dug, at the loss of 10-12 men, which in the morning was occupied by soldiers who kept up such a musket fire on the fort that the enemy could not make any effectual reply.

The next night the parallel was extended and the following night four batteries were completed. The troops brought with them four 18-pounder cannons, two 8-inch howitzers, three 5 1/2-inch and two 4.4-inch mortars. In addition to these eleven conventional artillery pieces, HMS Tonnant landed Lieutenant John Lawrence's 25-man detachment of Royal Marine Artillery with several Congreve rocket launchers, two 6-pounder rockets, and a hundred 12-pounder rockets. While they were constructing their siege works, the British forces endured constant American fire and took light casualties, but continued undeterred. Once their guns were in place, the British were ready to launch a devastating artillery attack on the now vulnerable fort.

On February 12 after a barrage of artillery, Lambert, under a flag of truce, called on the fort to surrender. He demanded that Major Lawrence accept British terms to prevent the needless slaughter of his men. Lawrence realised the vulnerability of the fort. It had no casemates to protect the gunpowder magazine, or the wounded, and it lacked land facing ramparts, which would cost a lot of men to defend. Lawrence reluctantly surrendered to the British, after having resisted for five days. An alternative history from British sources explains that on 11 February, before opening fire, Lambert called upon the fort to surrender. After negotiations, it was agreed that the Americans would leave as prisoners of war the following morning. The Governor reportedly begged for the delay "as so many of his men had got drunk." That was agreed to, with the gate of the fort moving to British control on 11 February, according to a British regimental historian.

=== Aftermath ===
With Mobile Bay secured by British warships and Fort Bowyer now under British control, the remaining American forces in the area hurried to Mobile to prepare for the expected onslaught there. With Fort Bowyer under control, Admiral Cochrane and General Lambert's next move was to take Mobile.

All British plans were cancelled when HMS Brazen arrived on February 13, carrying news that the Treaty of Ghent had been signed on the previous Christmas Eve. When news of ratification of the treaty arrived on March 5, ending the war, the British withdrew.

The final attachment of Mobile to the United States from the Spanish Empire was the only permanent exchange of territory during the War of 1812.

Fort Bowyer subsequently reverted to U.S. control. The War Department would later replace it with the more heavily fortified Fort Morgan.

Two active battalions of the Regular Army (1-1 Inf and 2-1 Inf) perpetuate the lineage of elements of the old 2nd Infantry that was present at Fort Bowyer in both 1814 and 1815.

== See also ==
- List of conflicts in the United States
