= Thomas Flournoy (general) =

American militia officer (1775–1857)

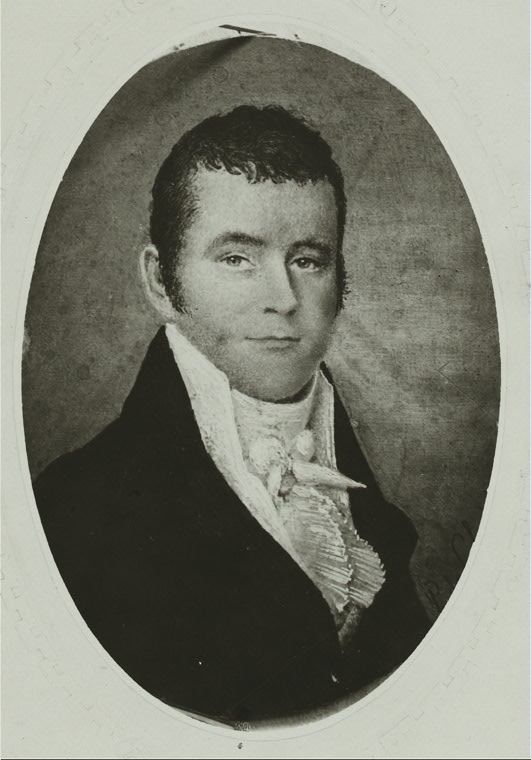
- Born: January 3, 1775; Henrico County, Virginia
- Died: July 24, 1857 (aged 82); Augusta, Georgia
- Military career
- Allegiance: United States
- Branch: Georgia Militia; United States Army
- Service years: ? –1812; 1812–1814
- Rank: Lieutenant colonel Brigadier general
- Commands: Seventh Military District
- Conflicts: Florida Patriot War; War of 1812

United States Treaty Commissioner
- In office 1820–1820

Thomas Flournoy (1775–1857) was a lawyer from Georgia and an officer in the Georgia Militia who was commissioned brigadier general in the United States Army when the War of 1812 began. In 1813 he became commanding officer of the Seventh Military District with headquarters in New Orleans. There he alienated important political leaders by questioning their loyalty. During the operations against the Red Sticks in Alabama he only half-heartedly supported the troops in the field, as the operations took place in his district but was under the overall command of Thomas Pinckney. Having been relieved of his command Flournoy resigned in 1814. In 1820 he was one of the United States commissioners negotiating with the Creeks, but he resigned the same year as a consequence of what he saw as undue interference from the State of Georgia.

== Early life ==
Flournoy was born in Henrico County, Virginia January 3, 1775. He studied law at Litchfield, Connecticut and moved with his older brother Robert to Augusta, Georgia where he practised law. A conflict with former governor and chief justice George Walton led to a duel 1804, in which he shot and killed Walton's nephew John Carter Walton. Flournoy was a lieutenant colonel in the Georgia Militia and as such became involved in the Florida Patriot War. When the War of 1812 began he was commissioned brigadier general in the United States Army.

== War of 1812 ==
In 1813, Flournoy replaced James Wilkinson as commander of the Seventh Military District with headquarters in New Orleans. Operations against the Red Sticks was, however, placed under the overall command of Thomas Pinckney, the commander of the Sixth Military District, even when taking place within the Seventh District. Subsequently, Flournoy was very unenthusiastic about providing troops and supplies to Pinckney and also to Andrew Jackson. He managed to alienate important political leaders in New Orleans and Louisiana by questioning their loyalty. He was criticized for the Battle of Fort Mims where the Red Sticks stormed the fort and defeated the militia garrison, afterwards killing the garrison and the refugees within it.

In the fall of 1813, the United States began a coordinated operation to defeat the Red Sticks. Three columns, one under Pickens, one under Flournoy and one under Jackson would from three different directions move against Hickory Ground. Flournoy's troops, put under the field command of Brigadier General Ferdinand Claiborne moved from Mobile, Alabama to Fort Stoddert and further north using the Alabama River as a supply route. Claiborne forces contained Mississippi Militia and United States Volunteers as well as Choctaw fighters and the 3rd U.S. Infantry Regiment.´In December Claiborne reached the Holy Grounds where he defeated the Red Sticks. In spite of the victory, Flournoy's petulance drove him to refuse to issue supplies to the 3rd Infantry. In 1814, Andrew Jackson replaced Flournoy as commander of the Seventh Military District.

== Indian Commissioner ==
After being replaced as military district commander, Flournoy returned to Augusta. He resigned his commission in the fall of 1814 and resumed his law practice. In 1820, he and Andrew Pickens were selected by Secretary of War John C. Calhoun to be United States commissioners negotiating what eventually would be the First Treaty of Indian Springs. Almost immediately after having assumed his appointment, Flournoy came into conflict with the commissioners who had been appointed by the state of Georgia. Writing to Calhoun, he vehemently rejected the Georgia commissioners claim to participate in the negotiations on equal terms with the federal commissioners. But Calhoun dismissed Flournoy's request that he should tell Georgia that the constitutional prerogatives of negotiating Indian treaties was vested in the United States, and told him to listen to and respect the state commissioners. Flournoy immediately resigned, saying that he refused to take responsibility for the actions of others who in the end would not sign the treaty.

== Family Life ==
Thomas Flournoy descended from French Protestants. He was born January 3, 1775, the eight of ten children to Mathews Flournoy and Elizabeth Patsy Prior Smith Flournoy. In 1801, Flournoy married Sophia Davis of Florida at the house of Governor Milledge of Georgia. They had nine children that lived to be adults. She died in 1829 and in 1834 Thomas married Miss Catherine Howell of Philadelphia. They had no children. Flournoy died in Augusta July 24, 1857. His second wife was still alive in 1894.
