= HMS Carron (1813) =

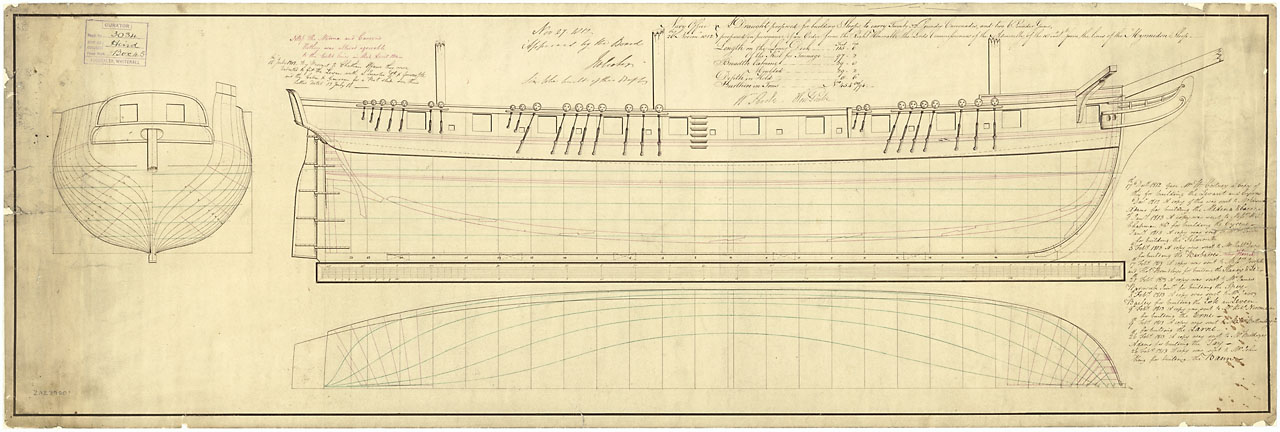
- Carron

History

United Kingdom
- Name: HMS Carron
- Ordered: 18 November 1812
- Builder: Edward Adams, Bucklers Hard
- Laid down: March 1813
- Launched: 9 November 1813
- Commissioned: 11 November 1813
- Fate: Wrecked 6 July 1820

General characteristics
- Class & type: 20-gun Cyrus-class sixth-rate post ship
- Tons burthen: 459 2/94 (bm)
- Length: 115 ft 8 1/2 in (35.3 m) (gundeck); 97 ft 2 3/4 in (29.6 m) (keel)
- Beam: 29 ft 9 1/2 in (9.1 m)
- Depth of hold: 8 ft 6 1/8 in (2.59 m)
- Sail plan: Full-rigged ship
- Complement: 135
- Armament: 20 × 32-pounder carronades; 2 × 6-pounder chase guns

HMS Carron was a 20-gun Cyrus-class sixth-rate post ship of the Royal Navy built in 1813 by Edward Adams, at Bucklers Hard in Hampshire. From August 1814 to April 1815, she was deployed on the Gulf Coast, in support of the operations of Edward Nicolls, commanding a detachment of Royal Marines, allied Creek warriors, and fugitive escapee slaves of the Corps of Colonial Marines. At the end of the war, she conveyed fugitive escapee slaves to be resettled. She was wrecked in 1820.

== Career ==
Carron was first commissioned in January 1814 under Captain Robert Cavendish Spencer (a son of George Spencer, 2nd Earl Spencer). At Bermuda, on 4 July 1814, Carron and Hermes embarked a company-strength force of Royal Marines, commanded by Edward Nicolls, for deployment on the Gulf Coast. They arrived at the mouth of the Apalachicola River on 13 August 1814. The vessels then took part in the unsuccessful British attack on Fort Bowyer on 15 September 1814 in which Hermes was lost. For much of the autumn, the Carron was at Pensacola, until General Andrew Jackson's numerically superior forces expelled the British at the start of November 1814.

Shortly thereafter, Carron made two lucrative captures when on 29 November she captured the schooners Hirondelle and Dos Amigos. For Spencer, the prize money was worth several years' pay. For an ordinary seaman, the money was worth a half to three-quarters of a year's pay. (Note: A first-class share of the prize money was worth £778 5s 4d; a sixth-class share, that of an ordinary seaman, was worth £14 0s 1 1/2d.)

Under the rules of prize-money, she shared in the proceeds of the capture of the American vessels in the Battle of Lake Borgne on 14 December 1814, in the run up to the Battle of New Orleans. (In 1821 the survivors of the British flotilla shared in the distribution of head-money arising from the capture of five American gun-boats and sundry bales of cotton. (Note: A first-class share of the prize money was worth £34 12s 9 1/4d; a sixth-class share was worth 7s 10 3/4d.))

Lieutenant James Barnwell Tattnall became Carron's acting temporary commander in 1814, during Captain Spencer's absence. Captain Spencer was mentioned in dispatches for his part in reconnoitering the Bayou Catalan on 18 December, so as to determine a suitable location for British forces to disembark. (Note: Letter from Cochrane to the Admiralty, dated 18 January 1815.) (Note: Letter from Keane to Pakenham, dated 26 December 1814.) At the time of the besieging of Fort Bowyer in February 1815, Captain Spencer was among the sailors landed near Mobile, and was second in command of the Naval party.

Carron was moored off St Vincent Island, near Apalachicola Bay, on 27 March 1815, and stayed in this area for the next month or so. On 19 April, her commander was reappointed to command HMS Cydnus.

Sir Alexander Cochrane rewarded Spencer his efforts in Louisiana and Florida by appointing him to command Cydnus in April 1815 after her captain had died. Captain Nicholas Pateshall commanded Carron from April 1815 until she was paid off in August 1816 at Portsmouth. (Note: Captain Pateshall, of the Jasseur[sic] is promoted to the rank of Post Capt. and appointed to the Carron (a vacancy occasioned by the death of Captain Langford, Cydnus).) (Note: The Carron, Captain Pateshall, and the Jaseur, Captain Lock, have arrived this week [on 17 July 1816] from Halifax; the latter left that place the 2nd inst. and was only 15 days on the passage.)

When the British evacuated, a number of refugees were embarked on 20 April, and Lieutenant Ambrister was embarked on 22 April, when both the Carron and the Cydnus sailed away from Apalachicola, Florida. When Carron arrived at New Providence in the Bahamas on 6 May, he disembarked. The refugees disembarked when Carron arrived at Bermuda on 22 May 1815. (Note: Within enclosure 8 to Erving. Memorandum of a gentleman of respectability at Bermuda, dated 21 May 1815 "I have since learned, that the Carron... is arrived at Nassau, on here way to Bermuda, with 176 slaves, of all ages... The People expected in the Carron, who are from Louisiana and West Florida, are also to be sent to Trinidad.")

On 6 August 1815, she was moored in Murray's Anchorage alongside HMS Dominica and HMS Regulus, and rode out a destructive gale that hit Bermuda. Carron sailed on a cruise from 10 August, returning to Bermuda on 26 August. On 15 November she sailed to 'Trinidad, with refugees.' The shipment of 32 refugees and their 43 children were mis-reported in the press as '50 North American Indians, who joined, during the late war, Admiral Cochrane’s squadron.' This was the second time she had conveyed fugitive slaves for resettlement to Trinidad. (Note: 'The initial Merikins arrived in Trinidad on May 27, 1815 (88 on the HMS Levant) and July 5, 1815 (and 58 on the HMS Carron)... November 27, 1815 [saw the] arrival of [the third group, via HMS Carron again, of] 65 ... The fourth and largest group of settlers arrived on August 20, 1816 with 411 men.')

Carron arrived at Portsmouth on 17 July 1816, and was paid off the following month.

Carron was recommissioned in May 1818 under Commander John Furneaux, for service in the East Indies.

== Fate ==
She was wrecked on 6 July 1820 six miles north of the Black Pagoda, which was 30 miles north of Puri. (Note: Some contemporary accounts refer to Carron being lost off the "Juggernaut", another name for the White Pagoda or Jagannath Temple, Puri.) Carron had been sailing south from the Sandheads, for Madras when she grounded at 3 am while her crew thought she was 60 miles off the coast. Despite all efforts to free her, she quickly took on water, lost her boats and broke apart. In the morning, the survivors found that she was only a quarter of a mile offshore. Those who could made it ashore; in all, she lost a lieutenant of artillery, the master, and 19 crewmen to drowning. The court martial board blamed a strong, unexpected current for the loss.

On 13 March 1821 Borodino arrived at Gravesend with Commander John Furneaux, his officers, and 15 of the crew of Carron. Borodino had come from Trincomalee via the Cape of Good Hope and Saint Helena.
