= Fort George (Pensacola, Florida) =

- Fort George site
- U.S. National Register of Historic Places
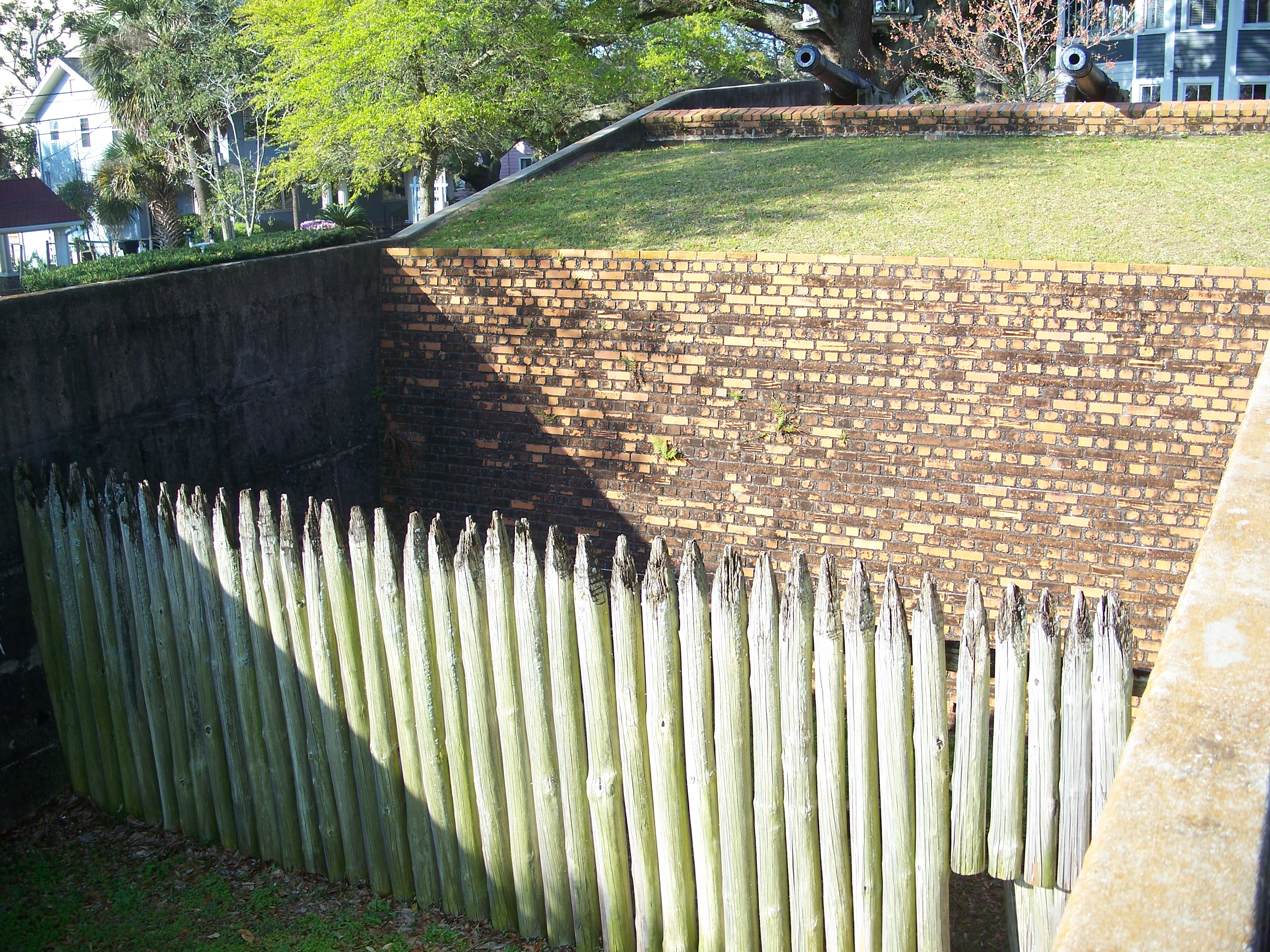
- Fort reconstruction

- Location within Florida Location within the United States
- Location: Pensacola, Florida
- Coordinates: 30°25′7″N 87°13′2″W
- Area: less than one acre
- NRHP reference No.: 74000620
- Added to NRHP: July 8, 1974

Fort George was a British fort built in 1778 for the protection of Pensacola, Florida. The Spanish captured it in Siege of Pensacola on May 10, 1781, during the American Revolutionary War.

The fort no longer exists, though part of it was later recreated to mark its original location. This reconstruction is part of the Fort George Memorial Park, which is in the North Hill Preservation District. The park is located on La Rua and Palafox Streets.

The site was added to the U.S. National Register of Historic Places on July 8, 1974.
