= Homathlemico =

Muscogee chief, hanged 1818

Homathlemico (died April 8, 1818) was a chief of the Muscogee people who once lived at Autussee in what is now Alabama in North America. Along with Hillis Hadjo (Francis the Prophet), he was decoyed to shore and captured near St. Marks, East Florida by an American naval ship flying a British flag during what is now known as the First Seminole War. Five days later, Homathlemico was summarily executed by hanging at Fort San Marcos de Apalache by order of U.S. Army major-general and future president Andrew Jackson. Jackson claimed that Homathlemico had led the party responsible for the Scott massacre, although there was no due process or trial on these charges before he was executed for his alleged crimes.

== See also ==
- Jim Boy – Muscogee war chief (1792–1851)
- Arbuthnot and Ambrister Incident (1818)

== Sources ==
- Boyd, Mark F. (1937). "Events at Prospect Bluff on the Apalachicola River, 1808–1818". Florida Historical Quarterly. 16 (2): 55–96. Article 4.
- Rosen, Deborah A. (2015). Border Law: The First Seminole War and American Nationhood. Harvard University Press. doi:10.4159/9780674425699. ISBN 978-0-674-42569-9. LCCN 2014030726. OCLC 906025995.
