= Milly Francis =

Creek (Red Stick faction) leader

Personal details
- Born: 1803 (about) near Montgomery, Alabama
- Died: 1848 (aged 44–45) Muskogee County, Oklahoma
- Cause of death: Tuberculosis
- Resting place: Somewhere on the campus of Bacone College
- Spouse: Cochar Hoboithley
- Children: Eight children; three survived to adulthood
- Parent(s): Josiah Francis, Polly Moniac
- Nickname: The Creek Pocahontas

Milly Francis (c. 1803–1848), daughter of Creek leader Josiah Francis (Francis the Prophet), was born near what is today Montgomery, Alabama, about 1803. Her name is sometimes thought to be an Anglicization of the Creek name "Malee", but the most recent thinking is that "Milly" was her birth name. She was a member of the Red Stick faction of the Creek tribe.

== Rescue of Duncan McCrimmon ==
In 1818, when living with her father on the Wakulla River near the San Marcos de Apalache fort (modern St. Marks, Florida), she saved the life of a U.S. soldier, Duncan McCrimmon (sometimes misspelled McKrimmon). He had gotten lost on a day out fishing. He was captured by two Creek warriors, and tied naked to a tree in preparation for his execution. Milly persuaded the executioners not to do it. This incident received much attention in the U.S. press, and was cited as an influential example of how the Indians were not all "savages" as was their customary portrayal. McCrimmon sought her out later, brought her "a modest gift of money from the citizens of Milledgeville" (the capital of Georgia, where McKrimmon lived), and offered to marry her, but she declined, although she accepted the money.

This too received wide publicity; she was called "the Creek Pocahontas". She was arguably, after Sacagawea, the most famous Native American woman of the nineteenth century. Census records show that hundreds of baby girls were named for her.

== Later life; pension ==
She presumably witnessed the 1818 execution by hanging of her father by Andrew Jackson, after McCrinnon told Jackson where her father was. She along with others of her father's town were then ordered to walk to Fort Gadsden and from there back to the Creek nation in Alabama. She was already "something of a celebrity" when she arrived at Fort Gadsden, which is where McCrimmon found her.

According to the 1832 Creek census, she had married Cochar Hoboithley and had had three children, although there were later 5 more. She was among those relocated on the Trail of Tears to Oklahoma. She built a small cabin on what is now the grounds of Bacone College. Her husband, a warrior, died in 1837 on his way to join her.

Many years later, Lieutenant Colonel Ethan Allen Hitchcock was sent in 1842 by the U.S. government "to investigate reports of frauds committed on the newly arrived emigrants" (to the Indian Territory). He had heard of her and, on the pretext of investigating "her claim for eight slaves then living among the Seminoles", sought her out. Finding her in great poverty, with only three surviving of her eight children, and "dressed something like a white woman", he wrote to Secretary of War J. C. Spencer asking that she be given a pension by the U.S. government.

This proposal was passed by Congress and signed into law in 1844. She was to receive a pension of $96 per year, retroactive to September 1843, and a medal, the cost of which was not to exceed $20. Milly did not even hear of this until just before her death in poverty in 1848 (of "consumption"), and received nothing. The pension monies due her at the time of her death were to have been paid to an Indian agent to benefit her children. A warrant for $20 to pay for the medal was issued in March 1848; Milly died in May without ever seeing it. While a scholar says it was "a treasured artifact to her descendants,"

The site of Milly's grave is also unknown, though presumably on the grounds of Bacone College, where her cabin was. There is a monument to her there, and historical markers at the site of Fort Gadsden, today Prospect Bluff Historic Sites, and at San Marcos de Apalache Historic State Park.
