= Arbuthnot and Ambrister incident =

1818 executions of British subjects by American general Andrew Jackson

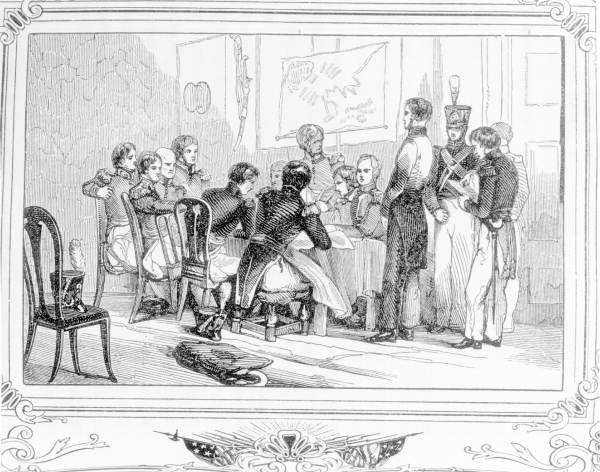
1848 illustration of the trial of Ambrister

The Arbuthnot and Ambrister incident occurred in April 1818 during the First Seminole War when American general Andrew Jackson invaded Spanish Florida and his troops detained two British subjects, Alexander Arbuthnot and Robert Ambrister. They were later tried by court-martial, found guilty of aiding the Native Americans against the United States, and executed. This prompted protests from the British and Spanish governments and condemnation as a violation of the conventions of war.

Arbuthnot and Ambrister were tried and executed in what is modern-day Wakulla County, Florida, at Fort Saint Marks.

== Background ==
Robert Chrystie Ambrister had been born in 1797 in Nassau, The Bahamas. During the Napoleonic Wars, he served as a midshipman in the Royal Navy between 1809 and 1813, when Ambrister returned to the Bahamas. In 1814, he was commissioned into the Royal Marines as the rank of auxiliary second lieutenant, serving in Spanish Florida in the Corps of Colonial Marines under Brevet Major Edward Nicolls during the War of 1812. Discharged from the military in Nassau in May 1815, Ambrister returned to Spanish Florida in 1817 with fellow Royal Marine veteran George Woodbine and Scottish soldier of fortune Gregor MacGregor.

Alexander George Arbuthnot was a Scottish merchant and translator who had been present in Florida since 1803 and occasionally served as a diplomatic go-between for various polities in the region.

== History ==
Arbuthnot and Ambrister were charged with aiding the Seminole, Red Sticks, and maroons against the United States. According to Samuel J. Watson, Jackson "lacked clear authority or jurisdiction under the law or in his position as a field commander" but had them "tried by court-martial, essentially as stateless persons and presumably unlawful combatants or spies, and they were executed at St. Marks without any reference to higher authority in Washington. (Federal law required presidential review in such cases.) Eighteen days passed between the initial capture and the court-martial; Jackson advised the War Department of the prisoners but conveniently neglected to explain what he intended to do with them...he reported the executions after the fact, on May 5, in the same report that announced his intention to occupy Pensacola." Pensacola was then a Spanish dominion and its occupation by Jackson, again according to Watson, had been specifically forbidden by both the executive and legislative branches.

Jackson's actions triggered short-lived protests from the British and Spanish governments and an investigation by the United States Congress. Congressional reports found fault with Jackson's handling of the trial and execution of Arbuthnot and Ambrister, but Congress chose not to censure the popular general.

Jackson's execution of Arbuthnot, Ambrister and the Muscogee and Seminole leaders Josiah Francis and Homathlemico was perceived, both in Britain and elsewhere, as an act of barbarity violating the conventions of warfare.

== See also ==
- Chesapeake–Leopard affair (1807)
- Don Pacifico affair (1850)
- Trent Affair (1861)
