= Hillis Hadjo =

Muscogee Creek leader (c. 1770–1818)

Josiah Francis
- Heles Haco
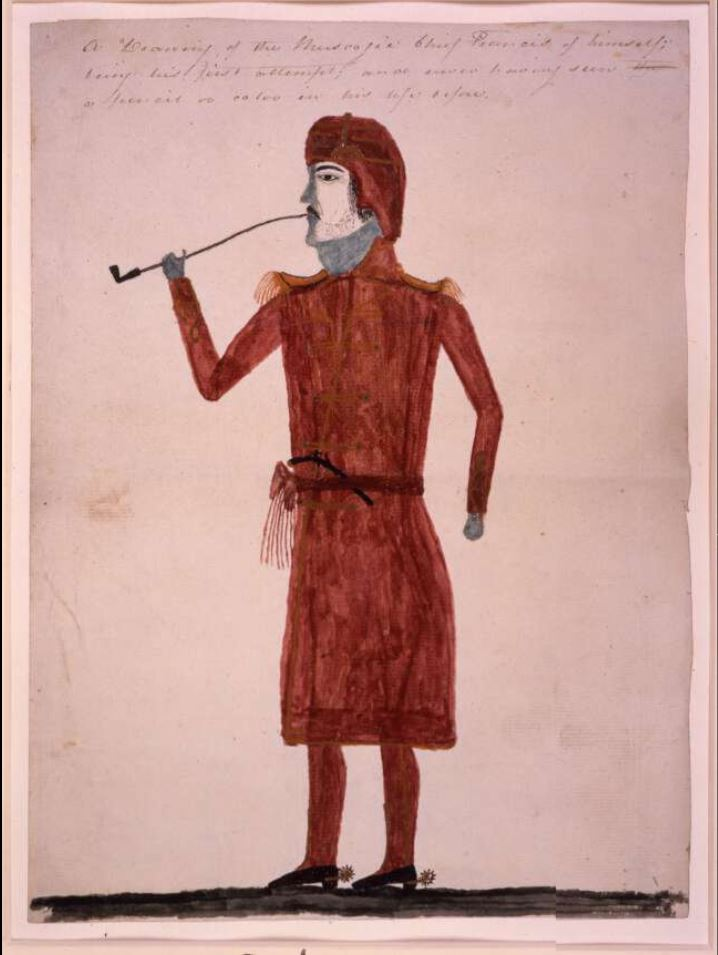
- Self-portrait of Josiah Francis

Red Stick Creek leader
- In office 1813–1818
- Preceded by: None
- Succeeded by: None

Traveled to England as representative of the Indian Nations (Creek and three other local tribes)

Personal details
- Born: Heles Haco; 1770 near Montgomery, Alabama
- Died: April 9, 1818 (aged 47–48) Fort San Marcos de Apalache
- Cause of death: Execution by hanging
- Resting place: San Marcos de Apalache
- Party: Red Stick Creeks
- Spouse: Hannah Moniac
- Relations: David Moniac, Alexander McGillivray
- Children: Polly, Milly, Earle
- Parent(s): European-American father, Creek mother
- Education: Illiterate. Sought education in England for his son.
- Nickname: Francis the Prophet

Military service
- Battles/wars: Battle of Burnt Corn, Battle of Horseshoe Bend (1814)
- An ally of his was Neamathla.

Josiah Francis, also called Francis the Prophet and known in Muscogee as Heles Haco ("crazy-brave medicine", anglicized as Hillis Hadjo) (c. 1770–1818), was a "charismatic religious leader" of the Red Stick Creek Indians. According to the historian Frank Owsley, he became "the most ardent advocate of war against the white man, as he believed in the supremacy of the Creek culture over that of the whites". He traveled to London as a representative of several related tribal groups, unsuccessfully seeking British support against the expansionism of the United States, then was captured and hanged without trial on the orders of General Andrew Jackson shortly after his return to Spanish Florida.

== Name ==
His native name has been written with a variety of spellings in English: Hilis, Hildis, and Hidlis. His last name is found as Hadgo, Hadsho, and Haya. There are also combined forms found, such as Hillishago and Hillishager. "The English always referred to him as Hidlis Hadjo." In a letter, Andrew Jackson called him "Hillishageer".

In traditional Creek orthography, his name would be Heles-haco Creek pronunciation: [hilis hatʃo] “Crazy Medicine” composed of the medicinal prefix heles- and the war title haco "crazy".

== Parents and early life ==
Francis was the son of a Muscogee Creek mother and a father of European descent. Since Muscogee Creeks were matrilineal and matrilocal, Francis inherited his clan from his mother and was a citizen of the Muscogee Confederacy. Francis and others like him became military leaders, passionate defenders of the Creek cause, apparently to demonstrate their legitimacy to the full-blooded Creek. Francis refused to wear white men's clothing during his visit to New Orleans. He was a trader and metal artisan, the latter skill learned from his father, David Francis, a South Carolina frontier blacksmith and silversmith. He "lived among the Alabama and Coushatta people near the point where the Cousa and Tallapoosa Rivers joined to form the Alabama", near modern Montgomery, Alabama. Little is known about his mother or his childhood.

Francis married Hannah Moniac (Muscogee), half-sister of William Weatherford and aunt of David Moniac, the first Native American to graduate from the U. S. Military Academy at West Point. David's father and Hannah's half-brother was "the prosperous and well-known Creek businessman Samuel Moniac. She was a relative of Muscogee leader Alexander McGillivray," who led the faction of "southern" Muscogee Creeks that were more receptive to assimilation into American society as a survival technique.

== Influence of Tecumseh and Seekaboo ==
Tecumseh, a leader from further north, in 1811 traveled throughout the lands west of the Appalachian mountains; settlement by whites was just beginning. With some encouragement from the British, with whom he had contact in Canada, he attempted to create a pan-Indian confederation, from north to south, that could force the new Americans to remain east of the mountains. His greatest success was among the Creeks, to whom he may have been linked through one or both of his parents. (His tribal origins are not known with certainty.) His credibility was enhanced by the New Madrid earthquakes and the Great Comet of 1811. Among the Creeks, his greatest influence was on Francis. Although Tecumseh's visit was brief, and he was widely credited later with incendiary speeches now believed to be forgeries by whites, he left behind his partner, the prophet Seekaboo (also spelled Sukaboo). One source says that he was a Shawnee, another that he was probably a Creek. Francis had extensive conversations with him. "The first recorded public fact of his life is being created a prophet, which was about the latter part of 1812. It took Sukaboo, the great Shawnee prophet, ten days' work to endow Francis with prophetic powers. When that was completed, Francis was considered the greatest prophet in the Creek Nation. He himself now assumed the role of prophet-maker, [and] made many prophets."

== Red Stick leader ==
Francis, as Prophet, was a leader of the Red Stick ("northern") faction of the Creek Indians, who opposed American expansion into their lands. He "hated the white man and his culture." He particularly disapproved of the husbandry of domestic animals, to the point of slaughtering his own (and burning his house) when he decided, about 1812, to give up the ways of whites. He began to have visions "and began to preach with the fervor of a new convert." He founded a new village, Holy Ground, on a bluff above the Alabama River. Opposition by the "Lower", or southern, Creeks, who favored accommodation to the whites, led to civil war, without a clear victor. In late July 1813, Francis accompanied Peter McQueen and over 300 other Red Sticks to Pensacola to ask the Spanish for weapons. On their return, their party was attacked in the Battle of Burnt Corn. Francis, who was called later "the principal instigator of this Creek war", led the attack on Fort Sinquefield, killing at least 13, two days after his Red Stick allies Peter McQueen and William Weatherford attacked Fort Mims in which over 250 men, women, and children were slain. The U.S. response did not take long to arrive, additional troops having been assembled. The U.S. won a decisive victory over the Creeks in the Battle of Horseshoe Bend (1814). Francis and some 1000 other Red Sticks and their allies fled to northern Florida, into the semi-wilderness of the Florida panhandle, where they soon aligned with British forces, which openly recruited Indian allies and became known as Seminoles. At the center of the wilderness was the strong new fort at Prospect Bluff, where Francis and Peter McQueen both wore British uniforms. It was built by the British after their defeats at the Battle of New Orleans and the Battle of Pensacola (1814) and intended as a base for operations against the southern United States. There were so many Creek refugees there ("virtually the entire surviving population of Redsticks") that famine was a real concern; the British were unprepared for that number of refugees. No food was available for purchase, and crops couldn't be raised without months of delay. Food had to be brought in from other British posts.

== Trip to England ==
When Colonel Edward Nicolls, the commander at Prospect Bluff, was returning to England after the end of the War of 1812 in February 1815, he took Francis with him, as Francis insisted on (and Nicolls discouraged). Before leaving, Francis disposed of the eight enslaved people he had, likely the same eight his daughter later claimed. The purpose was to get British agreement to the Treaty of Nicolls' Outpost, which Nicolls, on his initiative and without authorization (in fact, the British knew nothing of it until Nicolls and Francis arrived in England), had negotiated between the Creek Indians and the British Crown. The Treaty recognized the Native Americans as subjects of the Crown, that is, as British citizens. Francis took his son, Earle, with him, hoping the son could stay and get some education. A listing of crown expenditures on Francis's behalf reveals that besides his son, he was accompanied by a servant and an interpreter. (This conflicts with reports elsewhere that Francis was fluent in English and Spanish, as well as "Alabama" and "Muscogee".)

The day after arriving by boat, upon traveling to London on August 14, 1815, he stayed with Colonel Nicolls at his home near Eltham, Kent (near London). "Nicolls found it necessary to support the Indians [Francis and his son Earle] from his own funds, even to the point of buying them winter clothes." Francis was forbidden from traveling back to Florida until December 30, 1816, which was ordered by Earl Bathurst to prevent the visit from causing tensions with the United States after the Treaty of Ghent. Earle remained in England, and Col. Nicolls made several requests for a subsidy for the boy's keep and education, but his requests were to no avail. There is no record as to what ultimately happened to the boy. The government representative in charge of American policy, Earl Bathurst, refused to see him until a year had gone by; the meeting was to tell Francis the Creeks should make peace with the Americans, as he could give no support if another war between the two parties occurred in the future . Nicolls was chastised for exceeding his authority; he was posted, apparently as punishment, to remote Ascension Island, and later to Fernando Po. Bathurst gave Francis "a brace of pistols", a commission as a brigadier general, and sent him home but not without Francis meeting several prominent people, the story of which has not been written. A hint of it is in this report in the American press:

We see a pompous account of a ball given on board a Russian frigate lying off Woolwich, (Eng.) on the anniversary of the emperor's birth-— we notice it on account of the following paragraph: "The double sound of a trumpet announced the arrival of the patriot Francis, who fought so gloriously in our cause in America: he was dressed in a most splendid suit of red and gold, and by his side he wore a tomahawk, mounted in gold, presented to him by the prince regent; he appeared much delighted with the appearance of the frigate." We suppose this "patriot Francis" is a savage.

His shoulder bag is in the British Museum. Also in the British Museum are "a long hunting shirt of deer skin, moccasins, leggings and a belt". The following spring he received £200 of "clothing and agricultural implements" of which a list has survived.

== Hanging by Andrew Jackson ==
Francis arrived at Nassau, Bahamas in January 1817, where the governor, by order of Lord Bathurst, gave him another £100 in cash. He returned to Florida in 1817 to settle at his new home on the Wakulla River, near the fort San Marcos de Apalache (modern St. Marks, Florida). His daughter Milly Francis in 1818 famously rescued a U.S. soldier, Douglas McCrimmon, who had been captured by the Indians, a story that received national newspaper publicity. After his release, McCrimmon told General Andrew Jackson in person (Jackson was on a ship off St. Marks) that Francis, the leader of the Sinquefield massacre, was nearby. Jackson lured Francis aboard the U.S. schooner Thomas Shields by falsely flying a British flag. He was placed in irons and immediately hanged at St. Marks by Jackson, without a court-martial or any other legal proceeding, in sharp contrast with the "court of inquiry" he set up in the Arbuthnot and Ambrister incident. His daughter witnessed his hanging and later turned down McCrimmon's offer of marriage, possibly as a result of the capture.

== See also ==
- Homathlemico – Muscogee chief, hanged 1818
