= Panton =

Panton may refer to:

== Places ==
- Pantón, a municipality in Galicia, Spain
- Panton, Lincolnshire
- Panton, Vermont
- Panton Hill, Victoria
- Panton Arms Hotel, Pentraeth, a hotel in Anglesey

== Other uses ==
- Panton (surname)
- Panton Hill Football Club
- Panton, Leslie & Company
- Panton–Valentine leukocidin
- Panton Records, a Czech record label
- Panton Principles, a 2009 open science document named after a pub in Cambridge, England

== See also ==
- Pantone (disambiguation)
- Pantonality (disambiguation)
