= Panton (surname) =

Panton is a Scottish and English surname. Notable people with the surname include:

- Alexander Panton, Australian politician
- Catherine Panton-Lewis, Scottish golfer
- David Morrieson Panton (1870–1955), English cleric
- Diana Panton, Canadian singer
- Diomedes Panton, Filipino cyclist
- Frank Panton, British military scientist
- George Panton, British botanist
- Giles Panton, Canadian actor
- Jane Ellen Panton (1847–1923), English writer
- Javier González Panton, Cuban volleyball player
- John Panton, Scottish golfer
- John Panton (MP), Welsh politician
- John Panton (Australian politician), Australian politician
- Joseph Anderson Panton, Scottish-Australian magistrate
- Lucy Panton, British journalist
- Paul Panton, Welsh barrister and antiquarian
- Peter Panton, Australian racing cyclist
- Thomas Panton (1731–1808), English racehorse owner
- Thomas Panton (gambler) (died 1685), English gambler and property speculator
- Verma Panton, Jamaican architect
- Verner Panton, Danish designer
- Wayne Panton, Caymanian Premier
- William Panton, Scottish merchant

== See also ==
- Panton Corbett, English politician
