= Prospect Bluff Historic Sites =

Place in Florida listed on National Register of Historic Places

- British Fort
- U.S. National Register of Historic Places
- U.S. National Historic Landmark
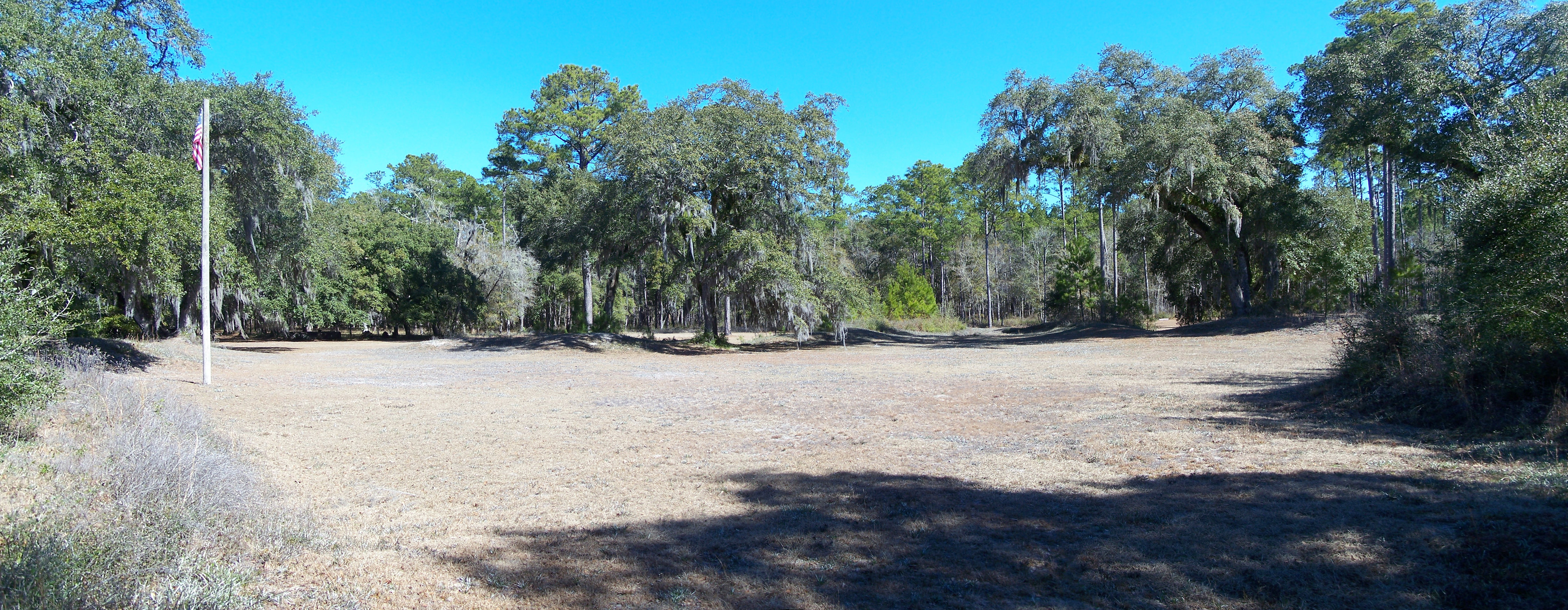

- Location within Florida Location within the United States
- Location: Franklin County, Florida
- Nearest city: Sumatra
- Coordinates: 29°56′N 85°1′W
- Area: 7 acres (2.8 ha)
- Built: 1814
- NRHP reference No.: 72000318

Significant dates
- Added to NRHP: February 23, 1972
- Designated NHL: February 23, 1972

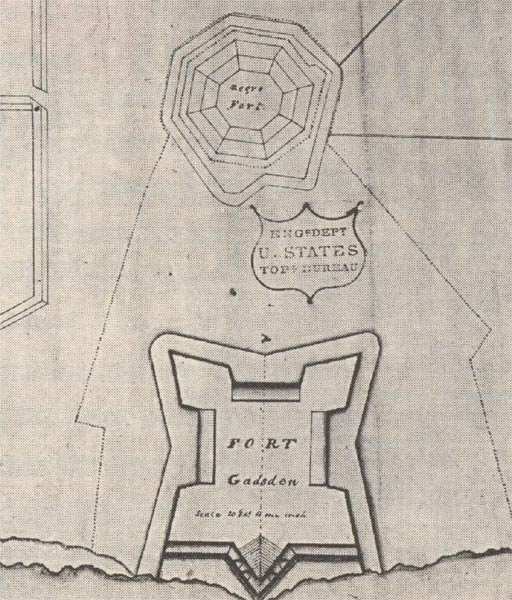
Map of Fort Gadsden, also showing the location of the original "Negro Fort". Prepared by Major James Gadsden in 1818.

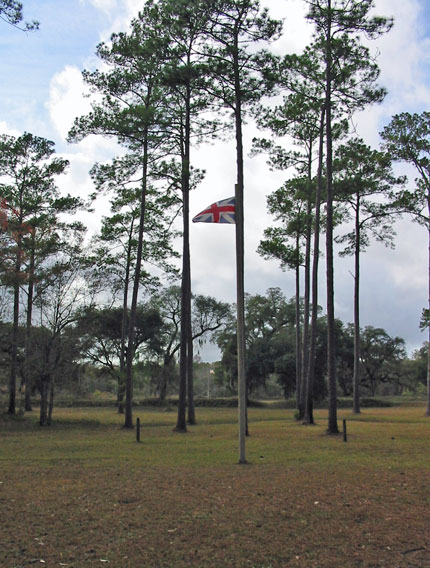
A Union Jack on the site of the original British fort.

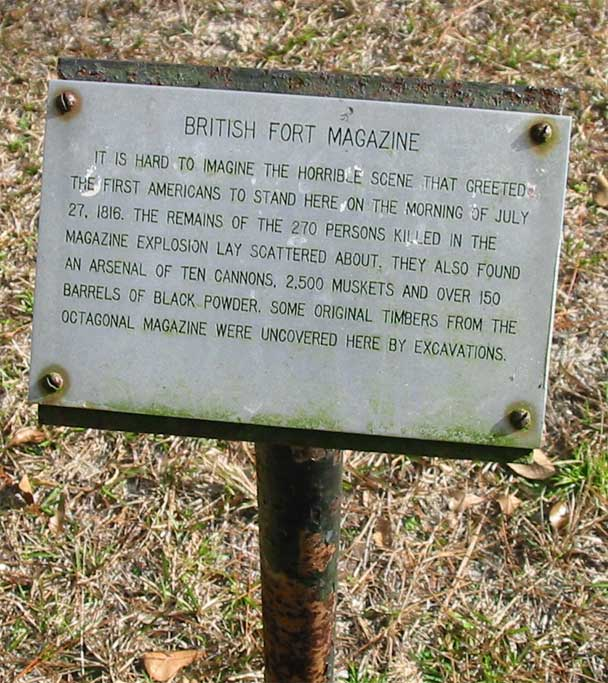
A commemorative plaque marks the location of the fort's powder magazine.

Prospect Bluff Historic Sites (until 2016 known as Fort Gadsden Historic Site, and sometimes written as Fort Gadsden Historic Memorial) is located in Franklin County, Florida, on the Apalachicola River, 6 miles (9.7 km) SW of Sumatra, Florida. The site contains the ruins of two forts.

The earlier and larger one was built by the British in 1814, during the War of 1812. They allowed the members of the disbanded Corps of Colonial Marines, made up largely of fugitive slaves, and Creek tribesmen to occupy it after the British evacuated Florida in 1815, deliberately leaving their munitions behind. At that point, since the British had not named it, Americans started referring to it as Negro Fort. It was destroyed in a river attack from U.S. forces in 1816.

Fort Gadsden was built in 1818 within the former walls of the former Negro Fort.

The site has been known by several other names at various times, including Prospect Bluff, British post, Nicholls' Fort, Blount's Fort, Fort Blount, African Fort, and Fort Apalachicola. The local natives called the land Achackwheithle.

Listed in the National Register of Historic Places and named a National Historic Landmark in 1972, the Prospect Bluff Historic Sites was acquired by the Apalachicola National Forest in 1940 and is managed by the U.S. Forest Service. The process of memorializing the site began in 1961, when the Apalachicola National Forest issued the State of Florida a term special use permit for an area of approximately 78 acres (32 ha) including the site to be run as a state park. Administration of the site reverted to the federal government in the 1990s. The site contains interpretive signage, picnic area with pavilion, and rest rooms.

== Prospect Bluff ==
The site of both Negro Fort and the later Fort Gadsden was Prospect Bluff, "a fine bluff overlooking the Apalachicola River," whose modest elevation of 12 feet (3.7 m) and the swamp that almost surrounded it (description below) gave it a natural military strength. The name parallels the Spanish one, Loma de Buena Vista, literally "hill with a good view".

Accessible only by river then, the site was and is still remote. The river was the boundary between East Florida and West Florida during the British Florida period (1763–1783) and the second Spanish Florida period (1783–1821). By modern land route it is 198 miles (319 km) from Pensacola and 271 miles (436 km) from St. Augustine. The area was sparsely populated, and in the twentieth century a large portion became the Apalachicola National Forest. The river was of intense interest to the British, who saw it as an undefended entry into the United States through Georgia. It was of no interest to the Spaniards; it led nowhere they cared about. Spanish forces in Florida were limited and Spain was far less committed to Florida than it was to its other colonies, most of them much more productive. Spain's inability to police its borders or return fugitive slaves was central to Florida's transfer to the United States in 1821.

Control of Prospect Bluff meant control of the river, which had served as a transportation artery for centuries. More recently, it had enabled raiding parties to go upriver into Georgia and the Mississippi Territory via the Chattahoochee and especially the Flint River. The attacks were made on plantations, which had few if any defenses. These parties, besides coming back with material goods, saw to it that the slaves of the raided plantations could get free. This was a great economic blow to the slave owners (slaves were expensive), and an ideological affront as well, leaving them insecure and angry.

Prospect Bluff was valuable militarily not only because of the elevation its name suggests, but because it was at a "strategic location", a bend in the river, giving an important sight advantage over any boat.

== Before 1814 ==
The Florida panhandle was mostly wilderness before 1814. Its population at the time is unknown, except for isolated reports. As in the rest of Florida, there were many Native American refugees from the United States, who merged into a new ethnicity, Seminoles. It provided excellent cover for escaped slaves, who, since they shared a common enemy, got along with the Seminoles fairly well; "over time, a bond developed between escaped Africans and the Seminoles that only increased with time and white pressure for their return". Some became black Seminoles. There was "reciprocal respect and affection"; the former slaves, who knew English, served as interpreters. This predecessor of the Underground Railroad ran south. The biggest issue about the area discussed by whites was how to get escaped slaves back, or get compensation for them, and prevent or reduce future escapes. The return of Native Americans was unwanted, and they were soon forcibly removed from Florida as well.

As was customary in pre-railroad times, settlement took place first along rivers. The name Apalachicola River derives its name from Apalachicola Province on what is now the Chattahoochee River (the Spanish regarded what is now the Chattahoochee as part of the Apalachicola River). Settlement at Prospect Bluff by maroons (escaped slaves and their descendants), Seminoles, and a few Europeans is documented at the end of the eighteenth century.

In January 1783 a conference was held in St. Augustine between the representatives of the British Crown—Governor Patrick Tonyn, Brigadier General Archibald McArthur, and Thomas Brown, the superintendent of Indian affairs—and the head men and principal warriors of the towns of the Upper and the Lower Creeks, who complained of the long distance they must travel to the stores from which they obtained their supplies. The Indians offered protection to merchants who would move their stores to locations closer to their territory, and pointed out the Apalachicola River as a suitable place for a trading house. The Creeks said it was not only more convenient for themselves, but also much nearer to the Choctaw, Chickasaw, and Cherokee Indians, and requested that the house of Panton, Leslie & Company, who had been supplying them with goods, should be solicited to settle there for that purpose.

William Panton was present at the conference, and agreed with the Indians to establish a store at such a place as he or his co-partners might find suitable between the forks of Flint river and the mouth of the Apalachicola River, provided that letters of license were issued to him and his partners. The agreement was confirmed by the Crown, and the traders were granted the necessary license. Their store opened in 1784, by which time Spain had regained possession of Florida, at Fort San Marcos de Apalache (modern St. Marks, Florida). This store was attacked and looted by the adventurer William Augustus Bowles in 1792 and again in 1800, at which point it ceased operations.

A trading post run by John Forbes and Company, successors to Panton, Leslie & Company, was set up in 1804 at the more defensible Prospect Bluff at the request of "Indians" ("Mickosuckees" is the only ethnicity mentioned). It was "manned by Edmund Doyle with some assistance from William Hambly, an Indian trader with years of experience in the area." Doyle and Hambly "each owned plantations higher up the river, at Spanish Bluff on the west bank and near present-day Bristol on the east bank."

The site of the trading post was inside the walls of the Fort, built around it; this explains why the precise site has never been identified. It included a building for storing hides (what the Native Americans had to trade), quarters for negro slaves, and a cow pen for several hundred cattle that were raised nearby. After the failed attack on Fort Bowyer in September 1814, the passing British troops, upon their return to Pensacola, ransacked the store at Bon Secour and freed the slaves.

Figures on the number of maroons who settled in the surrounding area range from 300 to 1,000. The blacks developed plantations extending up to 50 miles along the river. A report from 1812 mentions over 36 cleared acres and 1,200 cattle, and they lived in "large and well-built cabins". Their crops were peas, beans, corn, and rice.

== British Post (1814–15) ==
Construction at the site of the fort began in May 1814, when George Woodbine, a captain of Royal Marines was landed by Hugh Pigot from HMS Orpheus, and a powder magazine was built. Woodbine was bolstered by the arrival of over 100 officers and men led by a Brevet Colonel of the Royal Marines, Edward Nicolls, embarked aboard the Hermes and Carron, who arrived at Apalachicola, Florida on August 12.

Governor Manrique requested the redeployment of British forces to Pensacola at the end of August 1814. (Note: Captain Percy to Admiral Cochrane: 'I assented to re-embark the marines and proceed to that place; acquainting him [Nicolls] at the same time with my firm determination, in the event of not receiving a request from the Governor to land them, immediately to return to the anchorage off the Apalachicola, as I had promised the Captain-General, at the Havannah, not to land on Spanish territory without being requested to do so.' 'On the 21st August I left Apalachicola, and arrived at this anchorage on the 23rd; having fallen in with, off the bar, and brought with me sloop HMS Sophie. I fortunately found that a letter from the governor had been sent to me, requiring the naval force might be brought down, as he was threatened with an attack by the Americans: on the next morning I waited on the governor, when he requested me to disembark the detachment, ammunition, &c. which I immediately complied with. The fort San Miguel, the only one near the town, was put into the hands of Lieutenant-Colonel Nicolls; and the British colours were hoisted in conjunction with the Spanish, which he informed me was done with the governor's approbation.') Clavin notes the British presence was disruptive to slaveowners, which he describes as an "invasion", they remained and occupied Pensacola for the three months until General Andrew Jackson took the town on November 7, 1814. The British withdrew from their positions at Fort Barrancas the next morning. Thereafter, British forces made camp at the only community between Pensacola and St. Marks: the trading post of John Forbes and Company, surrounded by negro plantations. Nicolls resumed his original plan, "My intention now is to throw up strong works at the Bluff." It was located at Prospect Bluff.

Nicolls began to train local Native Americans as well as escaped slaves. (Note: Enclosure 60 to Erving. Ambrister's Commission from Cochrane. 'Whereas, I have thought fit to send a Detachment of the Royal Marine Corps to the Creek Nations, for the purpose of training to arms, such Indians and others as may be friendly to, and willing to fight under, the Standard of His Majesty: I ..appoint you as an Auxiliary Second Lieutenant, of such Corps of Colonial Marines ... Given under my hand and seal, at Bermuda, this 25th day of July, 1814') Nicolls recruited the ex-slaves into the new (black) Corps of Colonial Marines. They were well-armed, well-equipped, and underwent drills; many had been in training for months. He also assembled and trained more than five hundred Creek and Seminole Indians by February 1815, but they came from a different culture, did not like being trained, and did not have the incentive of being protected from American re-enslavement. Nicolls found the ex-slaves superior as soldiers, reporting that his black recruits had enlisted "with the strictest good faith and conduct, so much so, that out of 1,500 of them I never had occasion to punish one of them". He added that in contrast with British soldiers, "they would not get drunk".

Manrique complained to Cochrane about the slaves taken from Pensacola by Nicolls, Cochrane replied on December 5. Lt. José Urcullo arrived at Prospect Bluff on December 27. Nicolls was away (from December 7 to January 25), so Captain Robert Henry, as deputy, received him. He stalled Urcullo. On January 12, 1815, a dejected Urcullo, accompanied by only ten slaves, returned back to Pensacola to inform the governor that his mission had failed.

On February 26, William Hardridge traveled to Prospect Bluff, to reclaim his slaves. He spoke with Captain Hugh Ross, who responded that as Edward Nicolls was away, he could do nothing until Nicolls returned from Georgia. He spent three days there before departing, and passed on his observations to Hawkins, who wrote about these in a letter dated April 21 to Governor Early. A case of cannibalism was relayed from Hardridge to Colonel Hawkins.

In January 1815, for a second time Florida governor Mateo González Manrique requested Cochrane return the runaway Spanish slaves to the Spanish. The Spanish official Vicente Sebastián Pintado arrived at Prospect Bluff on April 7, Post-Captain Robert Cavendish Spencer having arrived earlier on March 27. (Note: Enclosure 8 to Erving. Memorandum of a gentleman of respectability at Bermuda, dated 21 May 1815 "Admiral Cochrane, however, appears to have disapproved of Nicholls's conduct in affording protection to the Spanish slaves, and had sent the Hon. Captain Spencer to Pensacola for the purpose of making arrangements for their restoration; who accordingly proceeded to Appalachicola, with Captain Pintado, named commissioner on the part of the Spaniards.") Pintado's report states that Spencer told the Spanish fugitives that they could not be transported to British territory, (Note: [Spencer] solemnly declared that, under no circumstances, were [Spanish fugitive slaves] to board English ships) (Note: 'The British had no right to harbor slaves who came from Florida... since Cochrane’s original proclamation only offered freedom to fugitive slaves from the United States.') and warned them that he foresaw future vengeful behavior on the part of the Americans. He informed Pintado that he would not return the runaway Spanish slaves by force. Pintado interviewed 128 Spanish slaves, he was able to persuade only 10, all women, to return voluntarily. He estimated 250 runaways to be present. In the presence of Pintado, he discharged the enlisted men of the Colonial Marines, settled outstanding accrued pay, and presented each man with a discharge paper. Pintado was angered by what he considered to be manumission documents, coupled with the refusal to forcibly return these men to slavery. (Note: Owsley notes 'When the British finally evacuated Apalachicola, a number of these blacks chose to go with them... Many of them chose to remain near the fort at Prospect Bluff.' Their "choice" in the matter was limited, given limited space in the transport ships.)

Nicolls's detachment of Colonial Marines in Florida had grown to about 400 men. (Note: Enclosure 6b to Erving. The testimony of a Royal Marine deserter from the Fort, sworn at Mobile on May 9, 1815, advising "the British left, with the Indians, between them three and four hundred negroes, taken from the United States, principally Louisiana) (Note: Enclosure 7 to Erving. Letter from General Gaines dated May 22, 1815 "P.S. I learn that Nicholls[sic] ..is still at Appalachicola, and that he has 900 Indians and 450 negroes under arms) British troops were to withdraw under the terms of peace that ended the War of 1812, consequently Nicolls received orders to withdraw his troops from the fort. (Note: Vice Admiral Cochrane wrote to Nicolls on February 14, and to Admiral Malcolm on February 17 stating "when Peace is concluded you are to embark Major Nicolls... there will be no farther occasion for the Marine Garrison, which.... you will order to be embarked, and sent to Bermuda") (Note: 'On 29 March 1815, Malcolm ordered Nicolls to withdraw, believing this restoration [of land to the Creeks] was being honoured and implemented; Nicolls being "on the ground" saw this differently') The first part of the Royal Marine infantry detachment departed Apalachicola on April 15 aboard HMS Seahorse, stopped at Havana, then A Coruña. and arrived at Portsmouth on May 30, 1815. The second, and final, part of the Royal Marine infantry detachment embarked on HMS Cydnus on April 22, (Note: On my arrival [on April 7 at] Prospect Bluff the officers and enlisted men were ready for the evacuation; this was fully completed within the fifteen days following that date.) and were duly returned to Ireland Island in Bermuda, arriving on June 13, 1815, to rejoin the 3rd Battalion as a supernumerary company. (Note: A letter from Spencer to Cochrane dated February 17, 1816 does mention that the Indian Chiefs were 'obeying Brevet Major Nicolls' orders until 22 April [1815]', whereupon Spencer sailed away.) Cydnus, HMS Carron and HMS Borer departed the anchorage off Apalachicola together. The refugees disembarked when Carron arrived at Bermuda on May 22, 1815. (Note: Within enclosure 8 to Erving. Memorandum of a gentleman of respectability at Bermuda, dated 21 May 1815 "I have since learned, that the Carron... is arrived at Nassau, on here way to Bermuda, with 176 slaves, of all ages... The People expected in the Carron, who are from Louisiana and West Florida, are also to be sent to Trinidad.") Those 58 refugees were later shipped to Trinidad, as the first wave of a total of 800 fugitive slaves resettled on Trinidad. (Note: 'The initial Merikins arrived in Trinidad on May 27, 1815 (88 on the HMS Levant) and July 5, 1815 (and 58 on the HMS Carron)... November 27, 1815 [saw the] arrival of [the third group, via HMS Carron again, of] 65 ... The fourth and largest group of settlers arrived on August 20, 1816 with 411 men.')

On May 16 the British evacuated the last of the garrison there. Nicolls left in mid-May 1815 with the Redstick Creek Francis the Prophet, (Note: 'COL. NICOLLS:-It appears that this great man has left the Floridas for Bermuda, in the gun-brig Forward, accompanied by captain Woodbine; an indian chief and about 50 slave troops.') (Note: JUNE 10.-"It is proper your excellency should know that on the 7th inst. a brig and transport arrived at Amelia Island, with col. Nichols, captain Woodbine; an Indian Chief, and his son.) also known as Josiah Francis and Hillis Hadjo, the Native American spiritual and political leader known for his role in the Battle of Holy Ground, seeking official imprimatur for the treaty Nicolls had negotiated. Francis took his son, Earle, with him, hoping the son could stay and get some education. Just prior to his departure in May Nicolls composed a letter on May 12, 1815 to Benjamin Hawkins, implying that the freed slaves had been shipped off to British territory. At the time of his departure in May 1815, Nicolls promised his allies to return in six months, according to Hawkins.

== Negro Fort (1815–16) ==
When the British withdrew, they deliberately left all their weapons, hoping that the locals would use them to defend themselves from U.S. attempts to re-enslave them, just as African and Native Americans had assisted the British during the American War of Independence. Most of the Native Americans (Seminoles and Red Stick Creeks) warriors who remained behind abandoned the fort soon afterwards.

The Corps of Colonial Marines detachment in Florida, which had grown to about 400 men, (Note: In his report to Manrique dated January 23, 1815, Urcullo concurred that the 'Negros under command amount to 500 men all armed.') (Note: Whilst deputising in Nicolls's absence, Robert Henry stated 'there was 5 Black men to 1 white Man under his command at the time.') was paid off and disbanded when the British post was evacuated at the end of the war. A small number of men went to Bermuda with the British as part of a refugee group, rejoining the main body of Colonial Marines. (Note: Within Enclosure 8 to Erving. Memorandum of a gentleman of respectability at Bermuda, dated May 21, 1815 "a few that were shipped to the island of Trinidad, in His Majesty's Ship, The Levant; and such as have enlisted in the Colonial Marines.") Over 200 were disembarked in Trinidad during 1815. (Note: Enclosure 8 to Erving. Memorandum of a gentleman of respectability at Bermuda, dated May 21, 1815 "I have since learned, that the Carron... is arrived at Nassau, on here way to Bermuda, with 176 slaves, of all ages... The People expected in the Carron, who are from Louisiana and West Florida, are also to be sent to Trinidad.") Nicolls estimated 350 remained. Others from the Florida unit remained in settlements around the Fort which had become a symbol of slave insurrection.

Over the next year the fort became a growing colony of escaped slaves from Georgia and the Mississippi Territory, and became known as the Negro Fort. It was the center of the largest community of free negroes in North America before the U.S. Civil War.

The fort, located as it was near the border, was seen by the U.S. as "a beacon of light to restless and rebellious slaves," "a center of hostility and above all a threat to the security of their slaves," "a direct threat to the slave-holding interests rapidly flocking to the newly opened lands in what is today Mississippi and Alabama." On April 8, 1816, General Jackson ordered General Gaines to "take care of the situation", because the Fort "ought to be blown up"; it was only fomenting "rapine and plunder", and he should "return the stolen Negros and plunder to their rightful owners".

Having done so, on April 23 he then complained to the West Florida military governor Mauricio de Zúñiga, asking

whether that fort has been built by the government of Spain — and whether the negroes, who garrison it, are considered subjects of his Catholic Majesty — and if not by the authority of Spain — by whom, under whose orders, has it been established[?]

He informed Zúñiga that:

Secret practices to inveigle Negroes from the frontier citizens of Georgia as well as from the Cherokee and Creek nations of Indians are still continued by this Banditti [sic; he means the garrison] and the Hostile Creeks. This is a state of things which cannot fail to produce much injury to the neighboring settlements and incite Irritations which may ultimately endanger the peace of the nation and interrupt that good understanding that so happily exists between our governments.

He insisted on the "return to our citizens and the friendly Indians inhabiting our Territory those Negroes now in the said fort and which have been stolen and enticed from them." This conduct "will not be tolerated by our government and if not put down by the Spanish Authority will compel us in self Defence to destroy them."

After Zúñiga's reply of May 26, 1816, informing Jackson that he could not act "unless I receive the Orders of my Captain General [in Cuba Juan Ruíz de Apodaca] and the necessary Supplies", Jackson proceeded with his plans to destroy the Fort.

The first step was the construction of Fort Scott, located at a key military point upriver, the west bank of the Flint River where it empties into the Apalachicola, in the southwestern corner of Georgia. Boats supplying Fort Scott had to go up the Apalachicola River and past the Negro Fort. The supply boats were escorted by two gunboats. "Gaines obviously wanted to provoke an attack to justify the stronghold's destruction." When shots were fired from the Fort at passing boats, this was all the excuse for action Gaines needed. On July 27, 1816, a "hot shot" (a cannonball heated to a red glow in the gunboat's galley) from the American forces entered the opening to the fort's powder magazine, igniting an explosion that was heard more than 100 miles (160 km) away in Pensacola, and destroyed the fort, killing all but 30 of 300 occupants. It has been called "the single deadliest cannon shot in American history." It was also "the largest battle in history between fugitive slaves and U.S. forces seeking to reenslave them."

Spain protested the violation of its soil, but according to historian John K. Mahon, it "lacked the power to do more."

A former commemorative plaque at the scene reads as follows:

BRITISH FORT MAGAZINE

It is hard to imagine the horrible scene that greeted the first Americans to stand here on the morning of July 27, 1816. The remains of 230 persons killed in the magazine explosion lay scattered about. They also found an arsenal of ten cannons, 2,500 muskets and over 150 barrels of black powder. Some original timbers from the octagonal magazine were uncovered here by excavations.

The trading post of John Forbes and Company, storekeeper Edward Doyle, was reestablished following the destruction of the fort.

The discord reoccurred when similar tensions resurfaced between Jackson and the Spanish, at the time of the First Seminole War. To facilitate a more cordial relationship with the Spanish, the recent issues of slave insurrection were portrayed as attributable to perfidious British influences during the War of 1812. (Note: Letter from John Quincy Adams to George W. Erving, United States Ambassador to Spain dated December 12, 1818. 'To this letter are annexed fourteen documents, the greater part of which consist of remonstrations, addressed during the late war between the United States and Great Britain to British officers, against their continual violations of the neutrality of the Spanish territory.')

== Fort Gadsden (1818–21) ==
To secure the militarily significant Prospect Bluff, protect commerce on the river, prevent the recreation of a fugitive slave community—new fugitives were arriving—, and as a base for his further invasion of Florida, in 1818 General Jackson directed Lieutenant James Gadsden, of the Army Corps of Engineers, to rebuild the fort, which he did within the earthworks that had protected Negro Fort, as it was much smaller. The fort needed a new name; Jackson named it Fort Gadsden. However, an aide to General Andrew Jackson reported to his superior in August 1818 that Fort Gadsden was "a temporary work, hastily erected, and of perishable materials, without constant repair, it could not last more than four or five years." It was abandoned in 1821, the year Florida became a U.S. territory and there was no longer a national border to defend.

Fort Gadsden had no direct involvement in any military endeavor, either in 1818–1821 or during the Civil War.

=== Colinton ===
In 1820, Colin Mitchell would purchase the Forbes Lands, including Fort Gadsden. The following year he made plans to construct a city at the site, Colinton. The planned city would have had 4 squares and wharves for incoming steamboats. However, Mitchell's claim to the land would be found invalid, and Colinton was never built.

A miniature replica of the later Fort Gadsden was constructed in the 1970s; a picture is in the State Archives of Florida.

== "Milly Francis" ==
A marker at the site recalls the case of Milly Francis, a Creek girl who persuaded her father, Hillis Hadjo (Francis the Prophet), not to execute an American soldier who had inadvertently come into their territory. Her father was captured and hung at Fort St. Marks in 1818. She witnessed his hanging.

== Irvington remains ==
A steamboat, the Irvington, burned and sank in 1838 four miles north of the Site. The rusting boilers and some of the works thought to be from this ship were dredged from the river (when the river was being dredged for navigation) and can be seen at the Site.

== Civil War (1862–1863) ==
During the American Civil War, Confederate troops occupied the fort, using it to protect communications from plantations in Georgia, Florida, and Alabama with the port of Apalachicola. In July 1863, an outbreak of malaria forced its abandonment.

== Bicentennial activities ==
- On May 16–20, 2016, the National Park Service held a workshop with 50 participants on using technological tools to non-destructively investigate below a site's surface.
- On October 22, 2016, the United States Forest Service commemorated 200 years since the tragic events of July 1816. There was a Seminole Color Guard, "descendants of Prospect Bluff Maroon community", with keynote speaker Chairman James E. Billie of the Seminole Tribe of Florida. A video of the ceremony is available.
- The Florida Humanities Council funded a program that created virtual landscapes for 1816 Prospect Bluff as well as the Maroon community of Angola on the Manatee River.

== See also ==
- Seminole Wars
- Fort Mose Historic State Park
- List of National Historic Landmarks in Florida
