= Pantone (disambiguation) =

Pantone is a corporation headquartered in Carlstadt, New Jersey, USA, that makes the Pantone Matching System Color Guides.

Pantone may also refer to:

- Dan James Pantone, an American ecologist and conservationist

== See also ==
- Panettone - a type of Italian Christmas sweet bread loaf.
- Pantone Tria markers
- Panton (disambiguation)
