= John Forbes and Company =

John Forbes (1767–1823) and his elder brother Thomas Forbes (d.1808) were Scottish traders who operated in East Florida, West Florida, Spanish Florida and the southeastern borderlands during the tail end of the eighteenth century. John Forbes & Company took control of the assets of its precursor trading firm, Panton, Leslie & Company, after William Panton died in 1801, followed by John Leslie in 1803.

When trade in deer hides and ammunition declined due to the War of 1812 and the Creek War, Forbes & Company sought repayment of losses through lawsuits against British officers and negotiations with Indian tribes. Creek and Seminole Indians ceded large tracts of land to the firm as payments for their debts, and the Spanish governor ratified the title. What became known as the Forbes Purchase equaled over 1.4 million acres acquired by Forbes and Company during the period from 1804 to 1812, making it the largest land grant in Spanish Florida. In 1817, the Forbes Purchase was sold to two merchants named Carnochan and Mitchel, who later formed the Apalachicola Land Company. In territorial Florida (1821–1845), the title to land near the Apalachicola River was not settled until 1835, and lawsuits related to land claims in the Florida Panhandle by heirs of Thomas Forbes were contested as late as 1887.

== Forbes families ==
Brothers Thomas and John were children of James and Sarah Gordon Forbes, who lived in the County of Banff, Scotland. John was christened on December 20, 1767, near Gamrie, and died in Matanzas, Cuba, on May 13, 1823. Thomas' birth date is not known; he died in 1808. The men had two sisters named Anne and Sophia. Like Thomas and John, Sophia's husband, Alexander Glennie, also worked in trans-Atlantic trade.

Genealogical records suggest that John Forbes, though never married, had children with a widow in Mobile, Alabama, named Marie Isabelle Narbonne. The family moved to an estate in Matanzas, Cuba in about 1818, where Forbes ran a sugar mill with his sons-in-law. Marie Narbonne died in 1822. A letter received by James Innerarity states that John Forbes died of dysentery on May 13, 1823 while sailing to New York.

Thomas Forbes married Elizabeth Anne Yonge in the Bahamas in 1789 and the couple had four children named William Henry, John Gordon, Mary Sophia and Thomas Irving Forbes. Some of Thomas Forbes' descendants later sued successors to John Forbes and Company to obtain reimbursement for lands that the company originally owned.

== Colonial export-import companies ==
Thomas Forbes, the older brother, probably arrived in Charles Town, South Carolina before the American Revolution and began meeting his future trading partners of Panton, Leslie and Company. His maternal uncle, John Gordon, had arrived around 1760. John Gordon and Company hired William Panton as a clerk in 1765 while importing goods from Europe that were sold to colonists and traded with the Cherokee and Creek (Muscogee) nations that controlled land west and south of the Southern Colonies. In 1772, Gordon named Panton as one of his attorneys. Another future partner and fellow Scotsman, John Leslie, began trading in the Charleston area before 1779, but primarily did business in East Florida.

Just before John Forbes arrived, all prior companies were dissolved when William Panton, John Leslie, Thomas Forbes, William Alexander and Charles McLatchy formed Panton, Leslie and Company in 1783. The new firm expanded into Florida and came to dominate the Indian trade from St. Augustine to Pensacola. In 1784, John Forbes sailed from Scotland to the Bahamas, where the company maintained wharves and warehouses, and then to St. Augustine, headquarters of the company in East Florida. He was shortly assigned to assist William Panton at the West Florida headquarters and to manage the store in Mobile, West Florida (Alabama did not become a U.S. territory until 1817.)

Panton, Leslie and Company and its successors engaged in the triangular trade, bringing manufactured goods to Africa via ship, which would traded for slaves. The slaves would be then be taken across the Atlantic to the West Indies and the Thirteen Colonies and sold to planters, including some Creek Indian chiefs. Rum, sugar, salt and indigo were acquired in the West Indies and taken to the North American mainland. Other goods, including firearms, gunpowder and lead bullets were exchanged with the Indians in return for deer hides and peltries. Hides, cotton, tobacco, sugar, rum and rice were taken back to Europe and sold to purchase merchandise for the next round of trade.

All of the partners of Panton, Leslie and Company were Scots who remained steadfast loyalists (referred to in the colonies as "Tories") during the Revolutionary War. The decision was pragmatic because their trade depended on manufactured goods which could not be made in the colonies. The partners came under attack from Patriots, and they were declared treasonous by the Committee for Safety in South Carolina. Owing to the hazards of staying in the rebelling colonies, in 1776 the partners moved to St. Augustine, Florida, which remained a haven for loyalists until the British government transferred the territory back to Spain in 1783 Peace of Paris.

William Panton and Thomas Forbes developed a working relationship with the Governor of East Florida, Patrick Tonyn. Their trading firm operated out of East Florida and Nassau in the Bahamas, acquiring trading posts along the St. Mary's and St. Johns rivers and plantations that grew indigo, rice, tobacco and cotton. The firm periodically imported African slaves who worked the plantations or were sold to other owners. Thomas also managed a very successful operation in the Bahamas.

When the Revolutionary War concluded, the British government transferred East and West Florida (which was under de facto Spanish control) to Spain. The new governors viewed the Indian trade as a key element in controlling the territory, and soon learned that the Creeks in particular preferred to deal with Panton, Leslie and Company. The partners gained status as agents of the Crown and were granted a near monopoly on trade. Pensacola soon garnered the most business, and Panton, Leslie and Company moved its headquarters from St. Augustine to Pensacola.

== Creek and Seminole Indian trade ==
A major reason that Panton, Leslie and Company dominated the trade with Creek Indians was the cooperation of a Creek chief ("mico") named Alexander McGillivray. The son of a Scotsman, Lachlan McGillivray, and half-Creek woman named Sehoy Marchand of the Wind clan, Alexander studied in Charleston before the Revolutionary War and worked in a Savannah-based mercantile house. However, he returned to Creek country before the war and became the British commissary. Because Patriot troops had confiscated his lands in Georgia, he remained loyal to Britain, and came to favor trade with Panton, Leslie and Company. In 1783, McGillivray was named a head warrior of the Creek nation.

Panton, Leslie & Company established a headquarters in Pensacola, West Florida, and other trading houses in Mobile and St. Marks, Florida from which goods could be carried into Creek and Seminole lands by boat and pack train. Deer hides were the principle item bartered between the Creeks and the trading company, partly because there was strong demand for leather during periods when the cattle plague (rinderpest) depleted leather stores in Europe. Hides and furs brought in by the Indians were exchanged for woolen goods, cotton and linen cloth, handkerchiefs, leather shoes, saddles and bridles, rifles and muskets, gun flints, bullets, brass and tin kettles, axes, metal pots and pans, scissors, fishhooks, tobacco and pipes. However, gunpowder was always the major item of trade.

Indians of the Southeast had begun trading with Spanish, English and French in the 17th century. None of the tribes had developed the ability to manufacture cloth, iron goods, or glass, and firearms became essential not only for procuring deer hides but also for defending tribal lands against rivals and settlers from the American colonies. All of the southeastern Indians became dependent on manufactured goods, and traditional crafts such as the ability to fashion stone-tipped knives and arrows diminished. Like the Cherokee, Creeks took on many practices of European culture, including stable village life with agriculture based on corn, beans, squash, melons and cotton supplemented by raising cattle and hogs.

After William Panton's death in 1801, John Leslie returned to London to manage the firm's business. In July, 1803, "John Forbes and Company" appeared on the books, and in 1804, officially replaced Panton, Leslie and Company. During the same period, partners in Florida including John and James Innerarity, interpreter William Hambly and others sought payment from the Indians for bad debts.

From 1804 to 1817, John Forbes and Company dominated Indian trade in Spanish Florida even though making a profit was difficult during the War of 1812, the Creek War, and the first Seminole Wars. Spanish authorities, including governor Vicente Folch, defended the company's duty-free status as a way of preventing incursions from American fur traders. James Innerarity and Edmund Doyle opened a new store at Prospect Bluff, 20 miles (32 km) north of the Apalachicola River mouth, and James managed the store in Mobile, which remained in West Florida although the United States claimed it had been part of the Louisiana Purchase of 1803.

John Forbes and Company operated in West Florida under the protection of the Spanish Crown. When the United States annexed Mobile and part of West Florida in 1814, Forbes and his partners, James and John Innerarity, claimed Spanish citizenship by residence, and obtained decrees from the Spanish governor verifying their status. The men adopted Spanish names and probably spoke fluent Spanish. To help affirm Spain's right to possess the territory, "Juan Forbes" wrote a book in 1804 entitled Descripción de las Floridas y medios de fomentarlas, which was translated as John Forbes Description of the Spanish Floridas, 1804.

At the end of the War of 1812, John Forbes and Company were paid $1800 for goods appropriated by Edward Nicolls’s forces at Prospect Bluff. The only chattels for which Robert Cavendish Spencer failed to reimburse the company for were the slaves, but he promised “to do everything that lay in his power to bring back the negroes.” Dale Cox observed that Nicolls and Woodbine maintained that the company had conspired with the Americans, so it received no compensation. Nicolls was highly scathing in his correspondence with Rear Admiral Pulteney Malcolm in March 1815, singling out John Forbes and the Innerarity brothers.

== Land cessions to the United States ==
Many of the Indian tribes that traded with Panton, Leslie & Company and John Forbes & Company lived on land between the state of Georgia and the Mississippi River. That area had been organized as Mississippi Territory in 1798 after Spain ceded the land to the United States with the Treaty of Madrid, and President Thomas Jefferson was interested in removing Indian tribes as a way to foster settlement of the territory.

Benjamin Hawkins, Indian agent in Mississippi Territory, and John McKee, Indian agent in Tennessee, met with John Forbes and discussed using Forbes & Company as an intermediary. Because the Creek (Muscogee), Choctaw, Chickasaw, and Cherokee (with the Seminoles, all were members of the five civilized tribes) owed debts to Forbes & Company, the tribes might agree to cede land in exchange for repayment of the debts by the United States government. The plan was discussed with U.S. General James Wilkinson, who forwarded the idea to Henry Dearborn, the U.S. Secretary of War. In 1804, Forbes set out for Washington to discuss the plan with Secretary Dearborn, taking with him a letter of introduction from General Wilkinson to Secretary of the Treasury, Alexander Hamilton.

Forbes & Company negotiated successful agreements with the four tribes in 1805. The U.S. signed separate treaties with each of the tribes, and the land cessions that totaled about 8,000,000 acres were approved between 1805 and 1814. The Creeks ceded land in Georgia between the Oconee and Ocmulgee rivers, the Choctaw ceded land between the Alabama and Pearl rivers, and the Chickasaw and Cherokee ceded holdings north of the Tennessee river. The United States paid Forbes & Company over $77,000 for their services.

== The Forbes land grants ==
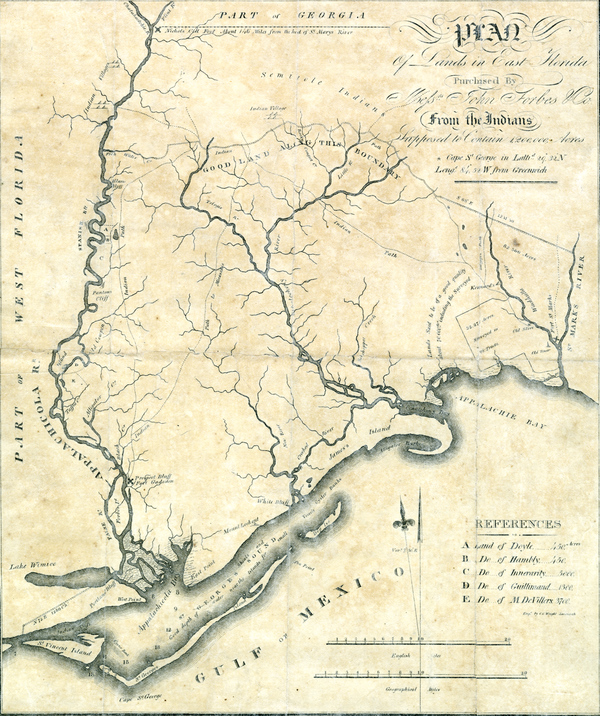
Land ceded by the Seminoles and Lower Creeks to John Forbes & Company in 1804-1811 became known as the Forbes Purchase. The grants comprised 1.4 million acres of land on the Gulf of Mexico between the Apalachicola and Wakulla Rivers in West Florida.

Even after his negotiations on behalf of the United States, John Forbes insisted that the Lower Creeks and Seminoles owed his company a large debt due to their participation with William Augustus Bowles in two robberies of the trading post on the Wakulla River in 1792 and 1800. The company had also issued credit to members of several tribes, including Creeks, Choctaws and Chickasaws, and claimed a total of over $192,000 was due to be repaid.

Forbes sailed for London after John Leslie's death in 1803 to register the name change from Panton, Leslie and Company to John Forbes and Company. Meanwhile, his partners, James and John Innerarity and William Hambly, negotiated with 24 Creek and Seminole chiefs for land cessions as payment. Between 1804 and 1811, the company collected most of the debt, being paid when the tribes ceded land to the company, with approval of the Spanish governor Vicente Folch y Juan. The transfer of land between the Apalachicola River and Wakulla River to the company became known as Forbes Grant I or the Forbes Purchase. It contained over 1.4 million acres that ran from the barrier islands of Apalachicola Bay to the Upper Sweetwater Creek in present-day Liberty and Leon Counties.

The Creek Indians had agreed to grant Forbes & Company their land only if the firm would establish a trading post on the Apalachicola River. In 1804, James Innerarity and Edmund Doyle built a post at Prospect Bluff, about 20 miles north of the river mouth. The trading post included a building for storing hides, quarters for Negro slaves, and a cow pen for several hundred cattle that were raised nearby. During the War of 1812, British troops looted the store and freed the slaves. Losses during the war later caused the company to petition the Spanish governor for a second land grant, later known as Innerarity's Claim or Forbes grant II. The second claim contained 1.2 million acres west of the Apalachicola River, but was overturned in Florida courts in 1830 when future Florida governor, Richard K. Call, learned that the cession took place too late to be valid.

When it was not possible to restore profitable trade after the War of 1812–1814, Forbes decided to sell the land in Forbes Grant I. Probably foreseeing that Spain and the United States would negotiate a treaty that would jeopardize his claims, he sold the property to two merchants named Carnochan and Mitchel in 1817. Future lawsuits related to the land would principally involve them and James Innerarity, who still owned about 40,000 acres of the grant. Heirs of the partners continued to file lawsuits until their claim was denied by the U.S. Supreme Court in 1906 in United States vs. Dalcour.

After John Forbes' departure, James and John Innerarity continued managing John Forbes and Company for several years, but sales were primarily with American settlers rather than Creek Indians. In 1830, John Innerarity purchased the remaining company assets in Pensacola, retired from the firm and closed the Pensacola store. The company's claim to land west of the Apalachicola River was denied by the courts, and their remaining Indian clients were forced to move west of the Mississippi River as a result of the Indian Removal Act of 1830. James continued managing the firm from Mobile, but John Forbes & Company came to an end when he died in 1847.

== Carnochan, Mitchel and Company ==
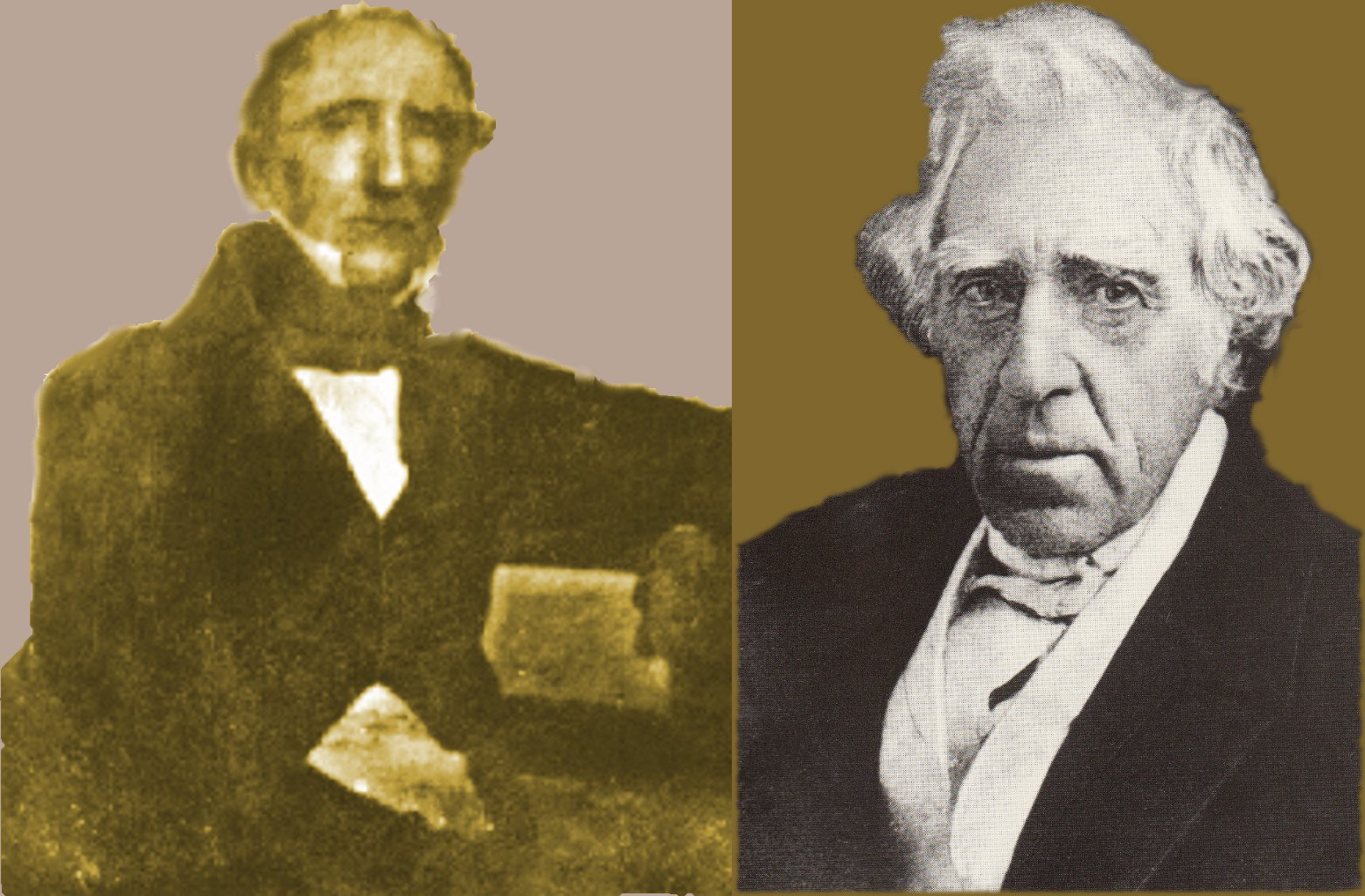
James Innerarity (left; 1777–1847) and his brother John (right; 1783–1854) took control of Forbes & Company after John Forbes retired in 1817. Both men became prominent U.S. citizens and lived in Pensacola or Mobile for most of their lives.

John Forbes had attempted to generate a profit for his firm by selling land to settlers. He also had attempted to secure direct payments of cash or land from the Spanish Crown, but neither of these strategies was fruitful. In December, 1817, John Forbes sold most of the lands his company had acquired east of the Apalachicola River for $66,666 to two merchants from Savannah and Cuba named Richard Carnochan and Colin Mitchel. He and his partners held about 25,000 acres in reserve, including Forbes Island in the Apalachicola River. An initial payment was to be made in London in 1818, and the balance of $50,000 was to be settled through annual installments. That balance was to be paid through mortgages that Forbes and his partners never received.

The lands of the Forbes Purchase were conveyed to Carnochan and Mitchel in the same year that John Quincy Adams and Luis de Onís began negotiating terms under which Spain ceded Florida to the United States. The emissaries signed the Adams–Onís Treaty in 1819 and it was ratified in 1821. Nominally, Spanish land grants made before January 24, 1818 were supposed to be lawful, but had to be validated through territorial or federal courts. The mechanism to secure title for large grants such as the Forbes Purchase was not set up by the U.S. Congress until 1828.

After the sale of the land, John Forbes gradually retired from company business, and he died in Cuba in 1823, leaving future disputes about inheritances to Carnochan and Mitchel, James Innerarity, and numerous heirs who believed that they had never received their promised inheritance when Panton, Leslie and Company and Forbes and Company disbanded.

== The Apalachicola Land Company ==
The first American settlers who moved into the territorial Florida Panhandle occupied what they considered unclaimed public land, but often was part of the Forbes grant. For example, Major Charles I. Jenkins, a U.S. customs collector in the District of Apalachicola, built a customs house on the west side of the Apalachicola River mouth. He was joined at the place called Cottonton or West Point by other squatters on land claimed by Forbes' successors.

The validity of Colin Mitchel and his partners' claim to the title of the Forbes Purchase could not be verified immediately. The partners laid out a settlement called Colinton near their former trading post several miles north on the river, but most newcomers bypassed the town and built homes near the customs house at West Point. In 1821, James Grant Forbes (no relation to John Forbes) included a map of Colinton and a description of the Forbes Purchase in his book about East Florida. Although the land had a vast reserve of virgin forest, most of the area was not suitable for farming or manufacturing.

In 1828, the U.S. Congress permitted claimants of Spanish land grants to file suits in federal courts, and Mitchel and partners petitioned the U.S. District Court to validate their claim. Their petition was denied in 1830, and the associates appealed to the U.S. Supreme Court. In the last decision taken by Chief Justice John Marshall, the court ruled in favor of Mitchel and partners in 1835. The partners reorganized as the Apalachicola Land Company, planning to raise funds by selling land and lots in the town that had been renamed Apalachicola, Florida in 1831. Immediately after the favorable decision, the company hired Asa Hartfield to survey the area in an attempt to provide documentation that could validate land titles. The initial sale of lots in Apalachicola raised $443,800, but later sales declined. An 1835 deed recorded in Leon County, Florida, shows Thomas Baltzell, future Florida supreme court justice, as the President of the Apalachicola Land Co.

Future disposition of lands in the Forbes Purchase never was straightforward. Some residents purchased lots and built homes. Others founded a new town called St. Joseph on land that was not included in the Forbes Purchase, roughly 20 miles northwest next to a deep-water harbor on St. Joseph's Bay (see St. Joseph, Gulf County, Florida). Most residents moved back to Apalachicola after a yellow fever epidemic in 1841 depopulated the town.

The Apalachicola Land Company continued attempting to sell land from 1835 up to the American Civil War. However, land sales never materialized, and without sufficient income, the company was forced to pay its debts and taxes by ceding land to its creditors. In addition, heirs of Thomas Forbes felt that they had been cheated of their inheritance, and filed a lawsuit in 1851. In 1855, John Beard was appointed as receiver for the company, and attempted to auction off the properties. He yielded his position to George Hawkins in 1866. Most of the land was sold for a few cents an acre. The Apalachicola Land Company ceased to exist, and years of litigation were required to settle titles to the land and barrier islands near Apalachicola.

== Forbes Purchase and Florida county boundaries ==
When citizens of Apalachicola moved to St. Joseph outside of the Forbes Purchase in 1835, they petitioned the Territorial Legislative Council to become the county seat of Franklin County. Although the petition was denied, a new county called Calhoun was split off from Franklin County and Washington County in 1838. The western Forbes boundary became the county line between Calhoun and Franklin, and persists to this day as the boundary between Franklin and modern Gulf County.

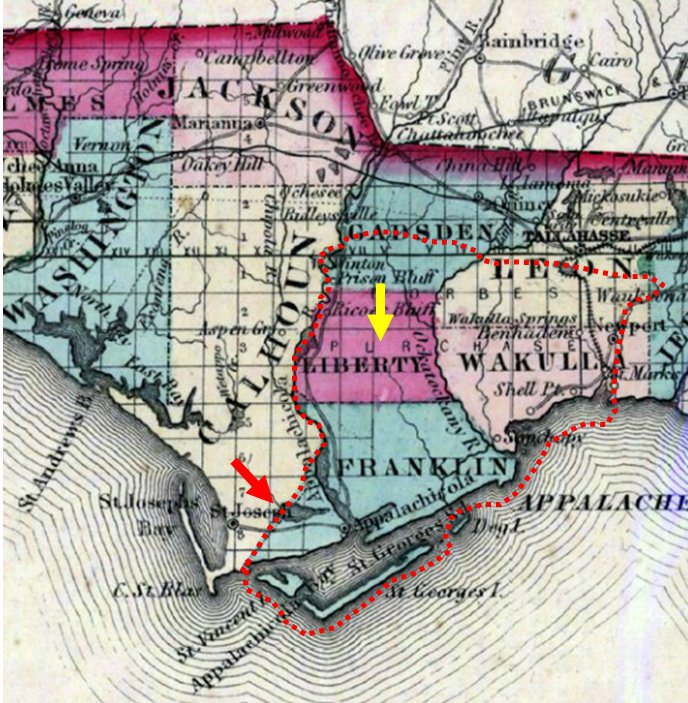
The western border between Franklin County and Calhoun (modern Gulf) County follows the border of the Forbes Purchase (red arrow). Likewise, Liberty County was formed from Franklin and Gadsden Counties partly to separate lands in the original Forbes Purchase from public lands (yellow arrow). The red dotted line approximates the outline of the Forbes Purchase.

When the heirs of Thomas Forbes sued the Apalachicola Land Company in 1851, residents who lived in Gadsden County in the northern part of the Forbes Purchase feared that they could lose title to their lands or face new taxes. The county representative suggested dividing Gadsden in two, with Liberty County in the southern central area containing most of the land from the Forbes Purchase. In 1855, Liberty County was formed by taking sections from Gadsden and Franklin counties. Gulf County was formed from Calhoun County in 1922 and follows the boundary of the Forbes Purchase. As a result, the Forbes Purchase continued to influence Florida boundaries and property sales long after the dispute was settled in 1887.

== Bibliography ==
- Anonymous (2008). "Florida County Maps". Florida Center for Instructional Technology (FCIT). University of South Florida College of Education.
- Boyd, Mark F. (1937). "Events at Prospect Bluff on the Apalachicola River, 1808–1818". Florida Historical Quarterly. 14 (2).
- Brown, J. A. (1959). "Panton, Leslie and Company, Indian traders of Pensacola and St. Augustine". Florida Historical Quarterly. 37 (1): 328–336. JSTOR 30166291.
- Clavin, Matthew J. (2019). The Battle of Negro Fort: The Rise and Fall of a Fugitive Slave Community. New York: New York University Press. ISBN 978-1-47-983733-5 – via Project MUSE.
- Coker, William S. (1979). "John Forbes and Company and the War of 1812 in the Spanish Borderlands". Hispanic-American Essays in Honor of Max Leon Moorhead. Pensacola, Florida: Perdido Bay Press. ISBN 978-0-933-77600-5.
- Coker, William S.; Watson, Thomas D. (1986). Indian Traders of the Southeastern Spanish Borderlands: Panton, Leslie and Company and John Forbes and Company, 1783–1847. Gainesville, Florida: University Presses of Florida. ISBN 978-0-813-00801-1 – via archive.org.
- Coker, William S. (1995). "The papers and history of Panton, Leslie and Company and John Forbes and Company". Florida Historical Quarterly. 73 (3): 353–358. JSTOR 30150455.
- Cox, Dale (2020). The Fort at Prospect Bluff, The British Post on the Apalachicola and the Battle of Negro Fort. Old Kitchen Media. ISBN 978-0-57-863462-3.
- Forbes, James Grant (1821). Sketches Historical and Topographical of the Floridas (1^{st} ed.). New York: C. S. Van Winkle.
- Forbes, John (1979). Coker, William S. (ed.). John Forbes' Description of the Spanish Floridas. 1804. Translated by Vicki D. Butt, Joyce Lee Durbin, Maria del Carmen McDonald, Mary Ellen West and William S. Coker. Pensacola, Florida: Perdido Bay Press. ISBN 978-0-933-77602-9. OCLC 4858053.
- Holmes, Justice (December 3, 1906). "US vs. Dalcour". FindLaw.
- Kennedy, Thomas C. (1989). "Sibling stewards of a commercial empire: The Innerarity brothers in the Floridas". Florida Historical Quarterly. 68 (3). Archived from the original on 30 December 2019.
- Owens, Harry P. (2014). Apalachicola Before 1861 (1^{st} ed.). Tallahassee, Florida: Sentry Press. ISBN 978-0-615-96741-7.
- Porter, Louise M. (2001). The Lives of St. Joseph. Port St. Joe, FL: Sheridan Books. ISBN 0-963-62282-X.
- Rogers, William Warren (1986). Outposts on the Gulf (1^{st} ed.). Gainesville, FL: University Presses of Florida. ISBN 978-0-813-00832-5.
- Upchurch, John C. (1969). "Aspects of the development and exploration of the Forbes Purchase". Florida Historical Quarterly. 48 (2). Archived from the original on 26 April 2023.
- White, David H. (1973). The John Forbes Company: Heir to the Florida Indian Trade, 1801 - 1819. Tuscaloosa, Alabama: University of Alabama Press.
- White, David H. (1974). "The Forbes Company in Spanish Florida, 1801-1806". Florida Historical Quarterly. 52 (3): 274. Archived from the original on 26 April 2023.
