= George Panton =

British botanist (d. 1902)

George A. Panton FRSE (d. 1902) was a 19th-century British botanist.

He is thought to have been born in Edinburgh around 1840, possibly the son of William Panton, a clothier.

In 1863 he is noted as a member of the Botanical Society of Edinburgh and was living at 31 Gayfield Square at the top of Leith Walk.

In 1877 he was elected a Fellow of the Royal Society of Edinburgh. His proposers were Sir Charles Wyville Thomson, Sir Archibald Geikie, John Hutton Balfour, and Alexander Buchan.

In 1882 he is noted as Secretary of the Birmingham branch of the Botanical Society of Edinburgh and is living at 95 Colmore Row.
