= Dan James Pantone =

American ecologist

Dan James Pantone is an American ecologist and conservationist with a Ph.D. from the University of California, Davis. A former professor at Texas A&M University, Dr. Pantone is a researcher who has published numerous refereed articles on agroecology and sustainable agriculture. In addition, he is a specialist in Geographical Information Systems (GIS) which he has used to help conserve endangered species. Dr. Pantone has established his broad experience in numerous scientific disciplines by publishing diverse articles ranging from the biological control of pests to the conservation biology of endangered species.

== Scientific activities ==
Pantone completed his doctoral research at UC Davis on the use of biological control agents which is a non-chemical means of controlling agricultural pests. Basically, he innovated a new method of identifying effective biocontrol agents by developing new techniques of plant population biology and multivariate statistics (i.e. path analysis). Furthermore, he contributed to the science of the biological control of weeds by pioneering the use of nematodes as biocontrol agents).

In addition to using biological control agents as a non-chemical means of pest control, Pantone researched methods of no-till cropping systems and crop cultural techniques to reduce pesticides in surface runoff water. Moreover, he developed a pesticide transport submodel for the soil erosion model AGNPS (Agricultural NonPoint Source Pollution), which is one of the most important models used in soil conservation. The AGNPS submodel simulates pesticide transport and allows the evaluation of various soil conservation techniques to help reduce pesticides in the environment.

A significant contribution to botany and weed science was his discovery of a new biotype of common cocklebur (Xanthium strumarium) in Texas. This newly discovered plant variety is referred to as multiple-seeded cocklebur (MSC). MSC and has up to 25 seeds per fruit, usually producing as many as nine seedlings. Normal common cocklebur has only two seeds per fruit that usually produces only one seedling. Although MSC appears to have enhanced seed production, experiments show that MSC can be controlled with biological control agents and the herbicides more easily than normal common cocklebur.

Pantone served as a member of the U.S. Fish and Wildlife Service endangered species recovery team involving the biological conservation of one of the rarest plants in North America, Amsinckia grandiflora. In addition, he completed plant population biology field experiments that measured the reproduction and competitive ability of A. grandiflora in comparison to closely related weedy species in the same genus. Essentially, he used quantitative field experiments to help answer the question why some plants are rare, while others are weedy.

Another scientific contribution was his work using methods of GIS to identify the habitat of an endangered plant species based solely on characteristics of its physical environment. Lane Mountain Milk Vetch (Astragalus jaegerianus) is an endangered plant species endemic to the Mojave Desert in California. Pantone innovated GIS methods to identify the habitat of this rare and endangered species based on elevation, slope, aspect and soil type.

In addition to his ecological and environmental research, Pantone has been involved in the preservation of human cultures, being the cofounder of an indigenous rights organization. Furthermore, he has independently filmed and produced five different documentary films on indigenous people of South America.

Presently, Pantone is the editor of the Amazon-Indians.org website and the Vice President of the Movement in the Amazon for Tribal Subsistence and Economic Sustainability (MATSES), a non-governmental organization that is providing aid to indigenous people in the Amazon so that they can preserve their culture and lands in a sustainable and independent manner.

== Selected publications by Dan James Pantone available on the Internet ==
- Pantone, D. J. 2006. A forest of their own, the Matsés people on the border of Peru. Cultural Survival 30(4):32-39.
- Pantone, D. J., and R. A. Young. 1996. AGNPS (AGricultural NonPoint Source Pollution): A software program for assessing nonpoint source pesticide pollution. HortTechnology 6:344-350.
- Pantone, D. J., B. M. Pavlik, and R. B. Kelley. 1995. The reproductive attributes of an endangered plant as compared to a weedy congener. Biological Conservation 71:305-311.
- Pantone, D. J., J. B. Baker, and P. W. Jordan. 1992. Path analysis of red rice (Oryza sativa) competition with cultivated rice. Weed Science 40: 313–319.
- Pantone, D. J., and J. B. Baker. 1991. Weed-crop competition models and response-surface analysis of red rice competition in cultivated rice: A review. Crop Science 31:1105-1110.
- Pantone, D. J., W. A. Williams, and A. R. Maggenti. 1989. An alternative approach for evaluating the efficacy of potential biocontrol agents for weeds. 1. Inverse linear models. Weed Science 37:771-776.
- Pantone, D. J., S. M. Brown, and C. Womersley. 1985. Biological control of fiddleneck. California Agriculture 39:4-5.
