= Pantonality =

In music pantonality may refer to:

- Twelve-tone music, seen as an extension of tonality to all keys (rather than to no key)
- Nonfunctional tonality or pandiatonicism

== See also ==
- Bitonality
