= Panton, Leslie & Company =

Scottish merchants in the Bahamas and Spanish Florida

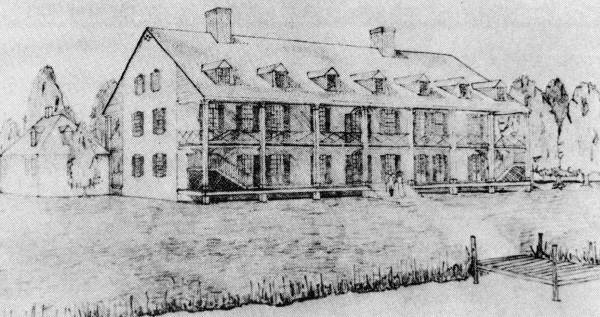
Panton, Leslie & Company headquarters in Pensacola, Florida. This building, built as William Panton's residence, also served as headquarters for the company and its successor from 1796–1848.

Panton, Leslie & Company was a company of Scottish merchants active in trading in the Bahamas and with the Native Americans of what is now the Southeastern United States during the late 18th and early 19th centuries.

The origins of Panton, Leslie & Company are in the firm Moore and Panton, in Savannah, Georgia, of which William Panton became a partner in 1774. In 1775, the British, who had acquired Florida by the terms of the Treaty of Paris in 1763, chose him to do their trading with the Creeks. He then joined with John Forbes to create Panton and Forbes.

Politically, Panton was a loyalist; he was not in favor of American independence. When Britain in 1783 accepted American independence, he had to leave the country, and his property in the United States was confiscated. As a new base for trading with the Native Americans he chose Florida, which was just completing 20 years as a British colony. Its capital, St. Augustine, was not far from Savannah. Panton, Leslie, & Company was formed there in 1783 by the loyalists William Panton, John Leslie, John Forbes, Charles McLatchy, and William Alexander, for the purpose of trading with the Indians of Florida and adjacent territories claimed by Spain. Having already established themselves in Florida and the Bahamas, the company was able to continue operating in Florida after the colony's return to Spain in 1783 because there were no Spanish traders interested in doing business with the region's Natives. Panton, Leslie & Company were granted a monopoly on this trade in East Florida, and eventually also dominated the Indian trade in West Florida. A different source says that in 1783 the Spanish gave the company a monopoly on trade with Natives throughout its colonies.

For many years Panton, Leslie & Company dominated trade with the Creeks and Seminoles. They eventually captured much of the trade with the Choctaws and Chickasaws, and were important in the trade with the Cherokees. The partners harbored a great antipathy to the United States and used their influence with the Native Americans to advance Spanish territorial claims against the US, as well as to encourage the Indians to resist white settlers and the United States' attempts to acquire land from the tribes.

Panton, Leslie & Company also operated as merchants in the Bahamas, organizing shipping of cotton and other local products, and acting as agents for merchants in Britain.

After the death of William Panton in 1801 and that of John Leslie in 1803, the company was reorganized in 1804 as John Forbes & Company.

== History ==
=== Scots immigrants and the deerskin trade ===
John Gordon, a Scots immigrant from Aberdeenshire, established a vast trade network in colonial South Carolina, Georgia, and Florida during the 1760s, thus laying the foundation of Panton, Leslie, and Company, which would become the largest mercantile company on the southern frontier.

After immigrating to the American colonies, William Panton and John Forbes, Thomas's younger brother, had done business with James Spalding (a trader who settled at St. Simons Island) and his partners before 1776 through Gordon's Charleston firm. Panton served as Gordon's clerk from 1765 until 1772, when Gordon appointed him one of his attorneys; Forbes was Gordon's maternal nephew.

The firm's five founding partners—William Panton, Thomas Forbes, John Leslie, William Alexander, and Charles McLatchy—formed Panton, Leslie & Company at St. Augustine, the capital of British East Florida, in late 1782 or early 1783. They were all Scotsmen who had traded with the colonists and Indians of South Carolina, Georgia, and East Florida before and during the American Revolution. It was a matter of survival for them to remain loyal to the Kingdom of Great Britain, as most of their trade goods, especially guns, lead, and gunpowder, came from the mother country, and rebelling against the British would have cut off those supplies.

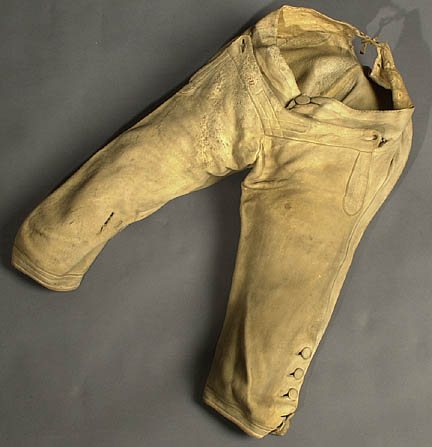
Yellow buckskin breeches, late 18th century, from the George C. Neumann Collection, Valley Forge National Historical Park

Between 1710 and 1714, European cattle stocks had been devastated by deadly bovine diseases, causing Britain to prohibit the importation of cowhides from continental Europe. As those supplies declined, the market for deerskins from British North America and Spanish Florida had expanded rapidly. Buckskin was used in place of cowhide to manufacture saddles, leggings, shoes, gloves, harnesses, whips, breeches, and aprons; by the middle of the 18th century, yellow buckskin breeches, formerly the working garb of common laborers, were worn by members of all social classes in England.

The southern deerskin trade declined gradually after the American Revolutionary War, but the resourceful Scottish merchants found new opportunities for trade with the Indians even as they lost political and economic influence in the former British colonies of South Carolina and Georgia. Panton, Leslie & Company and its successor, John Forbes & Company, were actively involved in Indian affairs and had sway over international diplomacy in the region. All the original partners were from northern Scotland. Panton, Leslie, and Forbes were born on the coast east of Inverness overlooking the Moray Firth; the birthplaces of McLatchy and Alexander are unknown. As staunch loyalists, the Scotsmen fled to St. Augustine during the war, and were allowed to stay when Spain regained Florida by the terms of the Treaty of Paris of 1783. The Spanish crown found it useful to sanction Panton Leslie & Company's trade with the Creeks and Seminoles, and allowed the firm to sell them British guns, ammunition, rum, and various dry goods as a means of solidifying the Spaniards' alliance with these southern tribes.

As early as 1776, Panton had 32,000 deerskins stored in his main warehouse: his other enterprises included naval stores, lumber, a rice and indigo plantation, and tracts of land. In the 1780s he and his partner Thomas Forbes were granted thousands of acres of land west of present-day Palatka; here they used slave labor to build drainage canals and dikes for a rice plantation, as well as to grow indigo and tap pine trees for naval stores such as turpentine, pitch, tar, and rosin.

=== Monopoly of the Indian trade ===
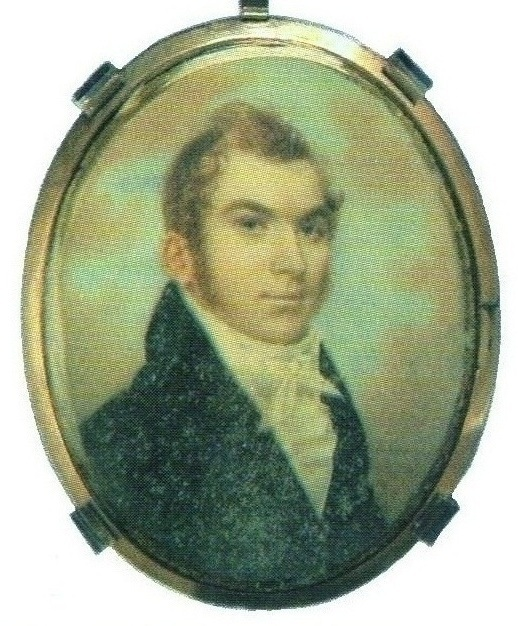
This is an unconfirmed portrait of Lachlan McGillivray, father to Alexander McGillivray, contained in a silver locket.

In January 1783 a conference was held in St. Augustine between the representatives of the British crown—Governor Patrick Tonyn, Brigadier General Archibald McArthur, and Thomas Brown, the superintendent of Indian affairs—and the head men and principal warriors of the towns of the Upper and the Lower Creeks, who complained of the long distance they must travel to the stores from which they obtained their supplies. The Indians offered protection to merchants who would move their stores to locations closer to their territory, and pointed out the Apalachicola River as a suitable place for a trading house. The Creeks said it was not only more convenient for themselves, but also much nearer to the Choctaw, Chickasaw, and Cherokee Indians, and requested that the house of Panton, Leslie, & Co., who had been supplying them with goods, should be solicited to settle there for that purpose.

William Panton was present at the conference, and agreed with the Indians to establish a store at such a place as he or his co-partners might find suitable on the Apalachicola River, provided that letters of license were issued to him and his partners William Alexander, John Leslie, Thomas Forbes, and Charles McLatchy. The agreement was confirmed by the Crown, and the traders were granted the necessary license. Their store opened in 1784, by which time Spain had regained possession of Florida, at Fort San Marcos de Apalache (modern St. Marks, Florida). This store was attacked and looted by the adventurer William Augustus Bowles in 1792 and again in 1800, at which point it ceased operations.

Many different traders and trading houses had vied for a share of the Indian trade on the southern frontier, but few survived long. Panton, Leslie & Company made an alliance with Alexander McGillivray, the quarter-blood leader of the Upper Creeks, who became a virtual silent partner in the concern. William Panton knew his father, Lachlan McGillivray, a prosperous Scots planter and a deerskin trader himself, and had recognized Alexander's ability since he was a child.

By 1786, when Spain granted Panton, Leslie & Company a monopoly over the Indian trade in East and West Florida, the firm owned 250 slaves and nineteen individual land grants in the Floridas encompassing 12,820 acres. Most of the slaves worked on company plantations and cattle ranches, but a few had specialized jobs: e.g., the company rented out its slave Langueste to the Spanish government as an Indian interpreter.

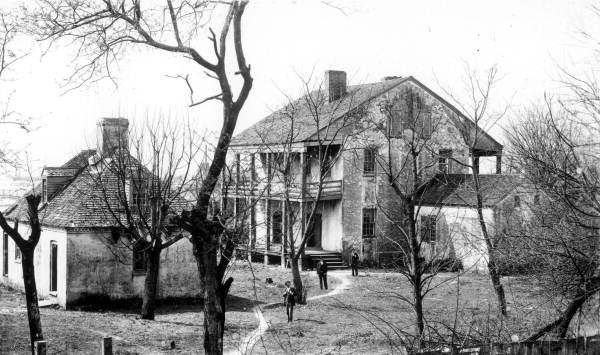
View of the north and east sides of the old Panton, Leslie & Company warehouse, converted into a residence for John Innerarity in 1806. The hipped roof building in the left foreground is the kitchen of the Panton mansion that was destroyed in a fire in 1848 (courtesy of the Pensacola Historical Society).

Working in partnership with Alexander McGillivray, Panton, Leslie & Company were able to expand their operations from East Florida and the Bahamas to the Mississippi River. Panton had promised McGillivray a one-fifth share of the company's profits once it obtained Spanish approval. With headquarters at Spanish Pensacola, by 1795 the company had a near monopoly on trade with Native American tribes in the southeast, its presence reaching northward from its headquarters in Pensacola to Fort San Fernando (formerly known as Chickasaw Bluffs) on the site of present-day Memphis, and westward as far as New Orleans, with posts at Mobile and several locations in Florida, the Bahamas, and around the Caribbean.

The Indian trade was generally an exchange between the colonies and Native Americans of the commodities each party desired but did not produce. The company was a major buyer from the Indians of hogs and cattle: either live on the hoof, as smoked or salted meat, or as skins. It also purchased indigo plants, hides, furs, corn, cattle, tallow, pitch, tar, hickory nut oil, tobacco, myrtle wax, salted wild beef, sassafras, canes and truck produce in exchange for weapons, gunpowder, tools, cloths, dyes, liquor, and various trinkets. Packhorse trains were outfitted with European-made goods—primarily guns, powder, flint, rum, and various dry goods—at Pensacola and the company's other warehouses, then sent to Indian villages in the interior, from which they returned with deerskins, furs, bear oil, honey, and foodstuffs. The company's agents ran stores in Indian villages scattered from the St. Johns River in East Florida to the Mississippi, and from the Gulf coast to Tennessee. The depot at Pensacola comprised a store and warehouses where the furs and skins were sorted and packed for shipment to foreign markets in schooners or brigantines belonging to the firm's fleet of fifteen vessels.

=== Exploitation of Native Americans and use of African slaves ===
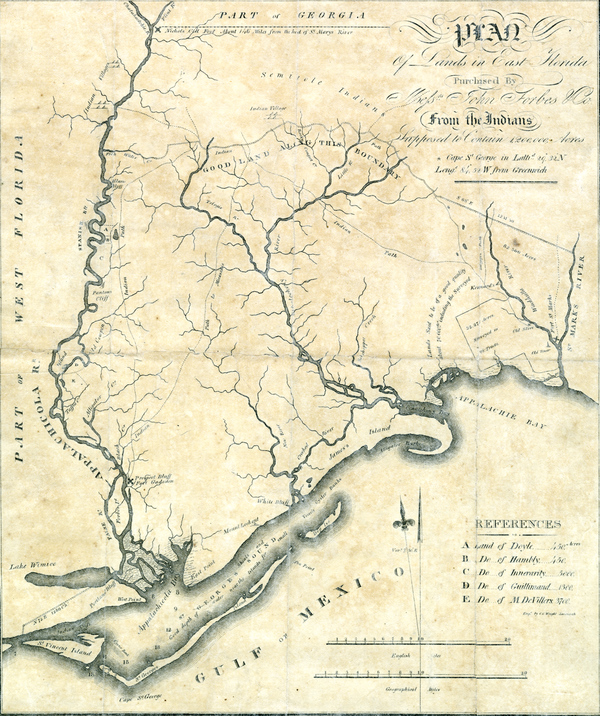
Panton, Leslie & Company reorganized in 1804 as John Forbes & Company, then sought to collect on its claims of debt against the Seminoles and the Lower Creeks. The Indians agreed to settle their debt by ceding land in 1806 and 1811 to the Spanish government, which conveyed the deeds for more than 1.2 million acres of land to its creditors, John Forbes & Company; this became known as the "Forbes Purchase". These grants comprised a tract of land on the Gulf of Mexico between the Apalachicola and Wakulla Rivers in Florida, extending inland twenty to thirty miles.

After its archenemy, the adventurer and self-styled "Director General of the Muskogee Nation" William Augustus Bowles, had been sent to Morro prison at Havana in 1783, Panton, Leslie & Company emerged as a multinational power broker acting in league with the plantation masters of the lower South. For almost twenty years, deerskins acquired from the Creeks and Seminoles had been shipped in the company's vessels to its massive warehouse in Nassau, where they were stored with other trade goods purchased from markets in the southeast for redistribution to the mainland markets to the north. Some bulk goods were sold to Bahamian merchants for retailing locally and in the outer islands; this Bahamian trade was managed by John Forbes. The company also was part owner of the salt works on Providence Island, the product of which was sent to Pensacola where it was sold to the Indians for high profits.

The company controlled the East Florida trade with a dozen posts, including five on both banks of the St. Johns River. In West Florida, the Pensacola store alone took in 250,000 hides in a peak year. Panton's salt works dried fish and tanned hides; Leslie's lumbermen on the St. Johns cut timber for sale in the West Indies where wood was scarce, and his drovers herded cattle to be slaughtered for salt beef. At such trading stores as Almacén de Nuestra Señora de la Concepción on the river's west bank, slaves tended the company's corn and vegetable crops fields, herded cattle, and tanned deerskins from the Indian towns. Other slaves processed the hides for export at the warehouse in St. Augustine.

The travel writer John Pope, who visited the region in 1790 on his tour of the southern and western territories of the United States, inquired into the accounting of profits generated by the Indian trade, and concluded that William Panton generally sold his goods at 500 percent of cost. From its earliest days the trade had yielded high returns: the apparently enormous profits were a matter of concern to some government officials and the leaders of the Creeks. Yet this business did involve risk and substantial legitimate expenses.

As in Louisiana, the Spanish government took advantage of the system already in place, adapting it to its own purposes. Panton, Leslie & Company, under very liberal terms from the Spanish point of view, held their monopoly as long as the Spanish controlled Florida; their influence with the Indians was essential to Spanish policy in its relations with the various tribes, and an important means of maintaining Spanish interests in the region before the surrender of all of Florida to the United States in 1821.

The Chickasaws, Choctaws, and Creeks rarely dealt with numbers and prices; their sales of hides and purchases of ammunition, weapons, liquor, and other goods took place on the barter system. Panton, Leslie & Company were there to make a profit, buying low and selling high. As they had a monopoly, prices were whatever they wanted them to be. The old native way of life was largely gone; the natives were dependent on European-style products. The price (credit towards barter) Panton, Leslie, and Company paid for hides was low, the goods the natives purchased were expensive, and the result was that the natives went into company store-like debt, which grew until it was enormous. To pay this debt the natives were persuaded to cede millions of acres (millions of ha) of land to the company. This land was within the current states of Alabama and Mississippi.

Among the most active firms and merchants participating in the slave trade of East and West Florida were Panton, Leslie & Company, Arredondo and Son, Zephaniah Kingsley, and John Fraser. Individually and jointly they imported at least ten groups of captive Africans, totaling 1,260 people, to Florida between 1802 and 1811. From Florida they were exported northwards, to Georgia and the Carolinas

== Archival material ==
A research project collected 517 microfilm reels and 31 cubic feet of paper records relating to Panton, Leslie & Company. These are held by the John C. Pace Library at the University of West Florida, in Pensacola. That library also holds the papers of the firm's attorney, John Innerarity. Papers of John Forbes are held by the Mobile Public Library.

== See also ==
- John Forbes and Company
- Prospect Bluff Historic Sites
