= John Gordon (merchant) =

British Loyalist merchant in South Carolina (1710–1778)

John Gordon (c. 1710–1778) was a Loyalist British merchant and trader of Scottish origin who lived in South Carolina for many years. He settled in Charles Town about 1760, and from 1759 to 1773 he was a major exporter of deerskins supplied by Native American hunters. Gordon also participated in the transatlantic slave trade but was not a major importer of captive Africans.

John Gordon did business in Charles Town and Savannah, as well as in British East Florida. The regional network of Scottish traders headed by Gordon in Charles Town, and the brothers John and James Graham in Savannah, served as a liaison between government officials (many of them fellow Scots to whom they were connected politically) and the Indian tribes, primarily the Creeks. Gordon also underwrote the mercantile activities of George Galphin, at that time the wealthiest Indian trader in the Southeast, whose trading firm was predominant in the tribal towns of the Chattahoochee Valley and in Coweta.

== Early years ==
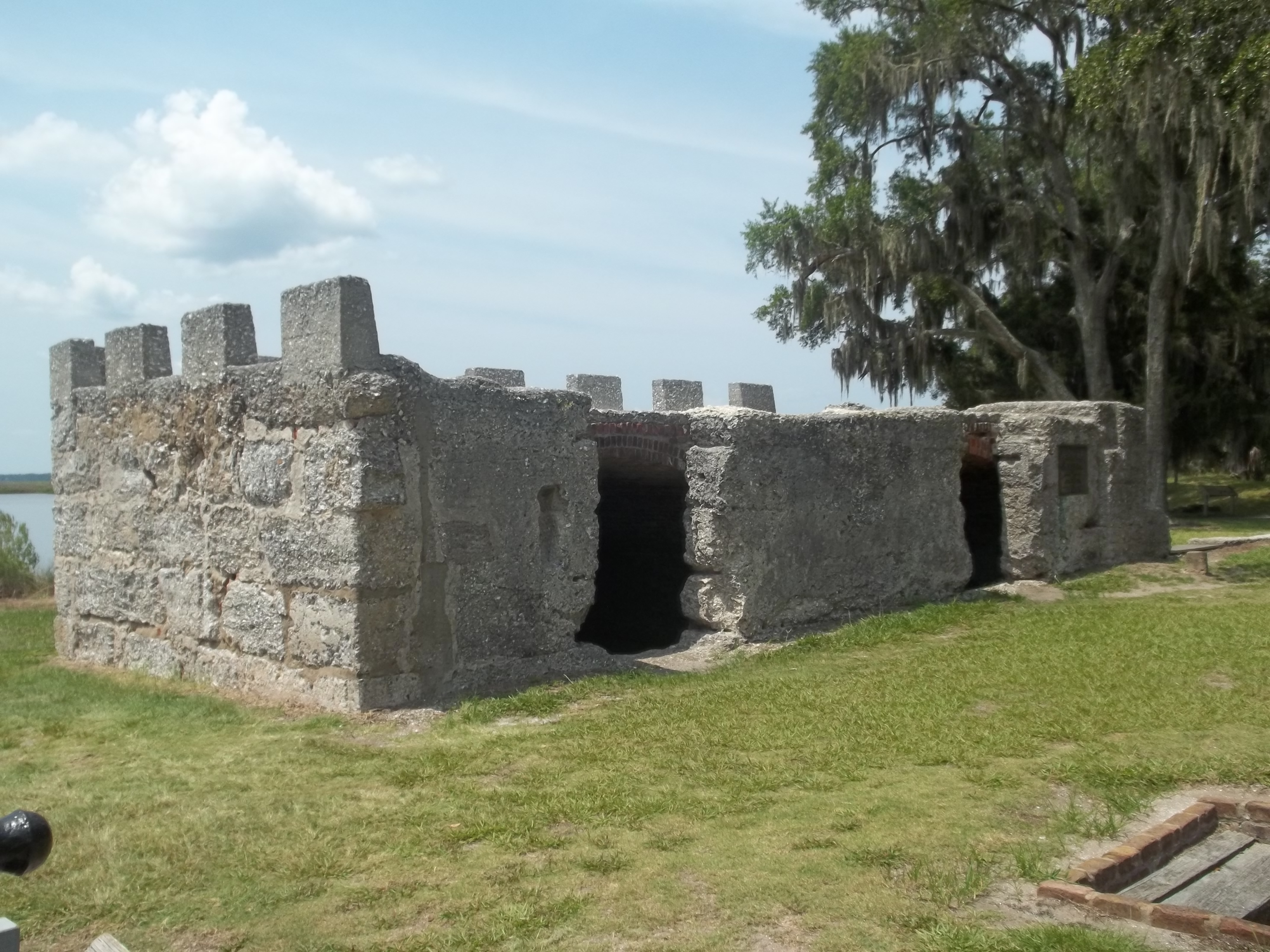
Fort Frederica, St Simons Island, Georgia

Gordon, the son of Mary MacQueen and John Gordon of Aberdeenshire, appears to have come to America in 1736, possibly among the 130 Highland Scots from Inverness aboard the vessel Symond, in the same convoy that brought John Wesley and his brother Charles to America. They were part of the so-called "Great Embarkation" of settlers recruited to emigrate to the new colony of Georgia founded by General James Oglethorpe. A list of the original settlers of St. Simons Island and the soldiers stationed at Fort Frederica in 1736 includes a John Gordon among those who were both settlers and soldiers. His rank is given as captain in the 1751 marriage records of the register of St. Helena's Parish at Beaufort, South Carolina.

Gordon started his entrepreneurial career during King George's War (1740-1748), supplying Oglethorpe's Regiment posted at Fort Frederica. When the regiment disbanded, he moved to South Carolina, and eventually became one of the leading deerskin traders in the colony. Economic prospects for the colony of Georgia had improved considerably by 1759; consequently Gordon determined to expand his operations and opened an office in Savannah headed by Thomas Netherclift, the son-in-law of his deceased longtime partner, and channeled a sizeable part of the deerskin trade through that location. There Gordon purchased a wharf lot, invested in local shipyards, and involved himself in regional activities beyond the profitable mercantile trade, including the establishment of several plantations, among them one on Daufuskie Island in South Carolina.

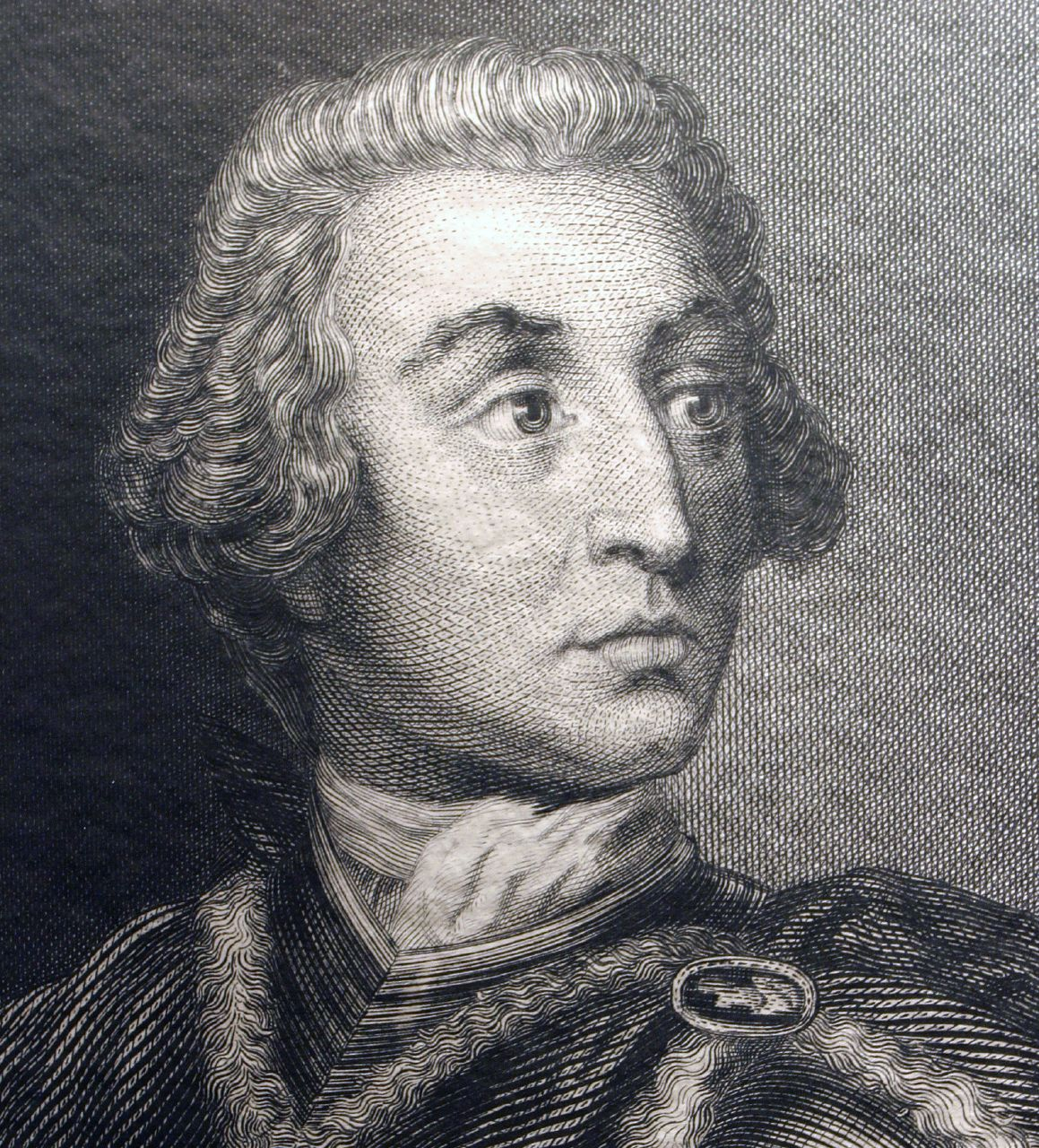
Drawing of James Edward Oglethorpe at Wormslew Historic site, Savannah, Georgia

During the 1750s, the firm of Elliott and Gordon was the most active in the trade between Beaufort and Georgia. John Gordon managed its affairs in Beaufort while Grey Elliot, a lawyer and land speculator, ran the Sunbury, Georgia office; the company was dissolved in 1760 when Elliot became the deputy auditor for Georgia. The Beaufort and Georgia trade had made Gordon rich—he sold his plantation, advertising his "very convenient dwelling house with kitchen, stable, stores and etc.[sic], on the Bay in Beaufort", and moved to Charles Town with his family.

In the 1760s, the colony of South Carolina granted titles to the low-water lots on the south side of Bay Street in Beaufort, usually to merchants like Francis Stuart and John Gordon. Local merchants traded in rice and indigo, and ran dry goods stores to supply the townspeople with necessities.

Planters from South Carolina had played a leading role in spreading rice cultivation into Georgia, but with the end of Georgia's prohibition on slavery in 1751, Scottish merchants and Indian traders were pioneers in the introduction of slave-based tidal rice cultivation to Georgia on the Savannah River and other saltwater marshlands.

In 1762, Gordon, his partner Grey Elliot of Sunbury, and John Mullyrne purchased a 1300-acre tract of land on Hutchinson Island opposite Savannah, which had sold previously for a few shillings per acre. There they developed 800 acres on the Savannah River for rice cultivation.

== Merchant vessels ==
Around the end of 1757, Moses Lindo sold the slaver ship Lindo Packett to John Gordon. A consortium of Charles Town merchants, including John Gordon, bought the 80-ton ship General Wolf of Charles Town, mastered by Resolve Smith. The other investors were John Poaug, John McQueen, John Torrans, and John Greg. The ship had been seized from the French by the English privateer Charming Nelly, commanded by Benjamin Smith.

The schooner Tybee was often seen at Port Royal on its regularly commissioned coastal trade runs for Gordon in Beaufort. During the Revolutionary War, the patriot Continental Association suspected the brig Beaufort of evading its trade embargo against Great Britain by smuggling South Carolina products to Georgia. In the latter months of 1776, the Beaufort smuggled goods on a regular run to St. Augustine in British East Florida for Gordon's associate, the Loyalist merchant William Panton.

== Land speculation in East Florida ==
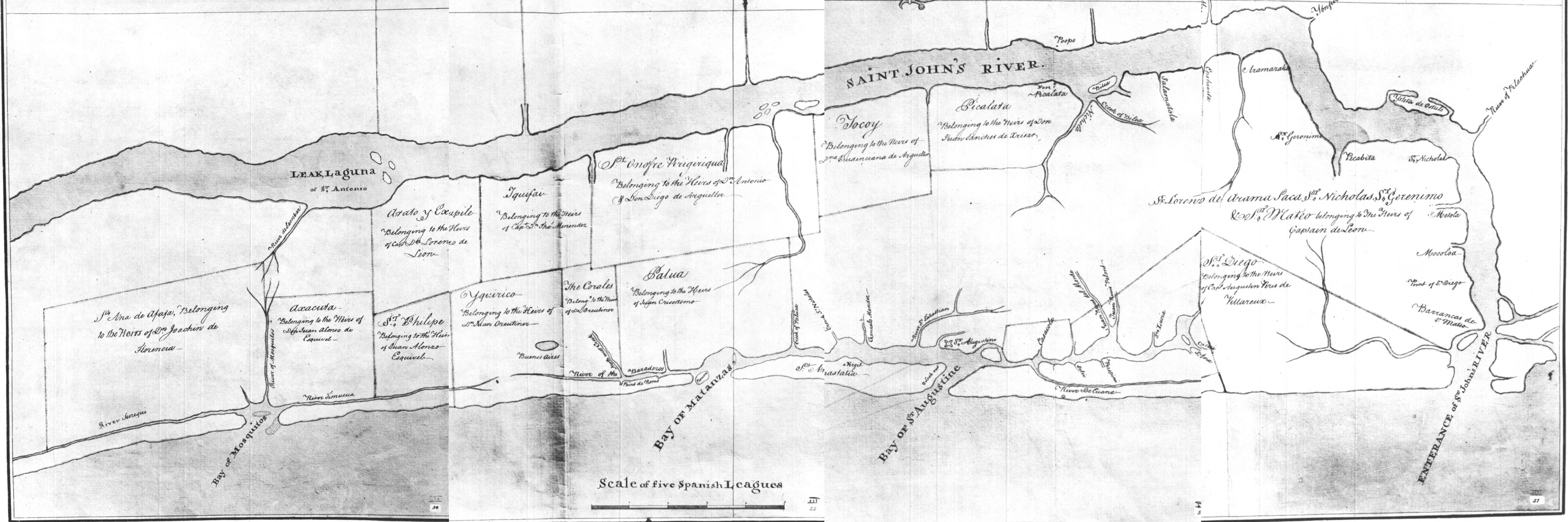
Map showing lands claimed by Gordon and Jesse Fish, copied by James Moncrief from John Gordon's original plan

After the signing of the Treaty of Paris of 1763, and with the impending mass evacuation of the Spaniards in Florida, Gordon recognized an opportunity to acquire lands there, and corresponded with the merchant Jesse Fish of St. Augustine about acquiring large tracts from the Spanish landholders, who were anxious to sell. Gordon raised the necessary capital and arrived at that city in August 1763. In September and October of the same year, the two speculators purchased hundreds of thousands of acres from departing Spaniards.

The Spanish governor of Florida, Melchor Feliu, was determined to ascertain the validity of all land titles before properties were sold to British subjects. The deeds signed by the Governor and the Royal Treasurer, Juan Esteban de Peña, affirmed that the Spanish owners of the lands had legitimate titles and that according to the Treaty of Paris, Gordon and Fish had become the "true and lawful owners and possessors" of those lands.

The Floridanos, or Spanish citizens of Florida, were allowed by the terms of the Treaty of Paris to sell their property to English subjects within a period of eighteen-months, but few buyers were found, leaving Spanish agents unable to dispose of St. Augustine properties. After the last of the emigrants had left, Juan José Eligio de la Puente, formerly chief official of the royal accountancy (Oficial mayor de la Royal Contaduria), returned to St. Augustine from Havana with an appointment to dispose of the remaining Spanish property. Because the incoming British soldiers had little money, and civilian settlers hoped to receive outright grants of land from the British Crown, few of them were interested in acquiring Spanish real estate. Under these conditions and with the uncertainty of future sales, de la Puente was eventually compelled to transfer all the unsold Spanish property to an agent who would represent its owners. In July 1764, most of the houses, lots, and lands, amounting to almost 200 estates in and around St. Augustine, were conveyed from de la Puente to Fish.

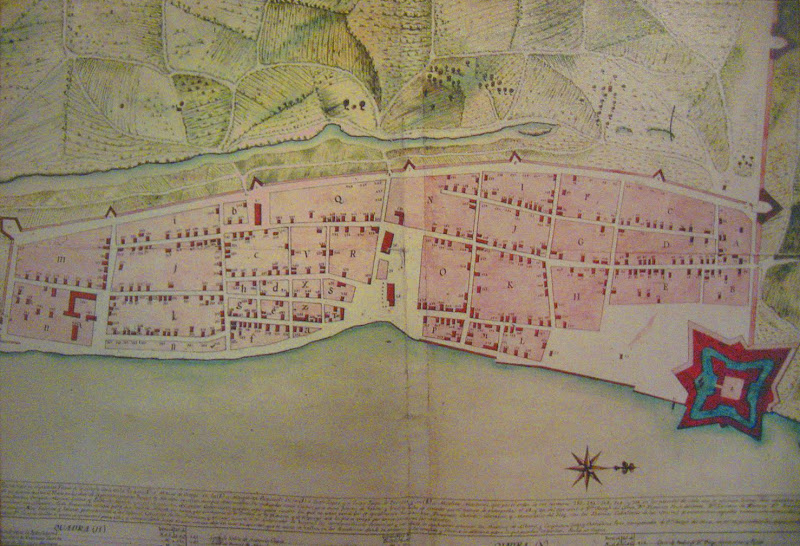
Map drawn by Elixio (sic) de la Puente, showing property lots of St. Augustine, 1764

Fish and Gordon were frustrated in their joint land speculations, as their claims were disallowed by British officials. Gordon, then a merchant and slave trader from Charles Town, had formed a partnership with Fish operating as his agent. The two speculators purchased largely from the outgoing Spaniards, but the British authorities refused to allow the deeds to be recorded. These officials disregarded entirely the conveyances of the Catholic church properties, and proceeded to take possession of them in defiance of the provisions of the treaty of 1763. Because the Spanish monarchy had proprietorship rights in the patronato real relationship of church and state, those same prerogatives were claimed in the name of the English monarch, who had assumed sovereignty in Florida. All tierras realengas (royal lands) in St. Augustine, including the church estates, thus reverted to the British Crown. The Catholic Church and the two partners were subsequently required to turn over the buildings and all the land in their transaction to the British government. On orders from England, the Spanish bishop's house was seized for use of the Church of England, and the Convent of St. Francis, which had the best well in the town, was taken to house British troops, extensive barracks being erected on the old foundations.

Early attempts to colonize British East Florida were hindered, particularly in St. Augustine, the capital of the province, by speculators like Jesse Fish and John Gordon, who held such great tracts of land. Fish and Gordon claimed ownership of a huge section of 4,600,000 acres on both banks of the St. Johns River, as far south as Ponce de Leon Inlet and westward as far as Alachua, and including a considerable portion of the Tampa Bay area. The Commissioners for Trade and Plantations rejected the validity of Fish and Gordon's "pretended purchase", telling their agents it was inconsistent with the spirit of the Treaty. Governor James Grant refused to confirm their grants and distributed the property to actual settlers. Years later, after many applications, broadsides initiated through the popular press in America and in England, the intervention of influential friends in London, and a voyage to England in 1772 to press his case, where he asserted that he was "legally empowered to transact all matters relative to their joint purchase", John Gordon eventually obtained some compensation, apparently remitting Fish's share.

== Scottish trade network ==
James Spalding from Perthshire, Scotland, and now of Frederica town on St. Simon's Island, operated two Indian trading stores on the St. Johns River, one on the east bank, and another on the west bank. He and his partner Roger Kelsall bought many of their goods through John Gordon in Charleston and merchant Basil Cowper in Savannah. Spalding and Kelsall, like many of their fellow traders, as well as Gordon and Cowper, were loyal to Great Britain. Panton, Leslie and Company, later the most well-known of the Creek trading firms, took over the Spalding and Kelsall stores when the two merchants emigrated to the Bahamas following the American Revolution.

After 1768, when the British military posts at Picolata and San Marcos de Apalache (St. Mark's) were abandoned, John Gordon enlisted the aid of the Governor of East Florida, James Grant, and the Indian Superintendent, John Stuart, in setting up George Galphin's traders at those locations. Gordon's warehouse supplied their stores, and his vast trade network in South Carolina, Georgia, and Florida laid the foundation of Panton, Leslie, and Company, which would become the largest mercantile company on the southern frontier. William Panton and John Forbes had done business with Spalding and his partners before 1776 through Gordon's Charleston firm. Panton served as Gordon's clerk from 1765 until 1772, when Gordon appointed him as one of his attorneys, and Forbes was Gordon's maternal nephew. Panton and Forbes were two of the founding partners of Panton, Leslie and Company.

== Cultural pursuits ==
Gordon had his country seat at Belvedere, a plantation outside the city proper, where he lived with his family when not at his townhouse in Charles Town. He speaks of the botanist John Bartram and his son William having visited the city on their travels in the southern provinces, and of his giving them letters of introduction to a friend who could smooth their passage among the Creek and Chickasaw Indians "when passing through the Indian towns of those savage countries."

In a letter dated Charleston, January 4, 1765, he mentions Lord Adam Gordon being present, and his interest in botanical matters. John Gordon and Lord Adam Gordon seem to have been related, perhaps as cousins by their descent through the Gordons of Aberdeenshire. However, an entry Lord Adam made at Charlestown on 9 December 1764, in a notebook he kept on his tour of the British American colonies, refers to John Gordon, Esq., as his "worthy landlord and friend", but makes no mention of such a familial relationship, although it takes notice of John Gordon's two daughters.

In the journal he compiled of his travels in America, Lord Adam briefly describes the land claimed by John Gordon around Tampa Bay, and alludes to the possibility of creating a cross-Florida waterway from the Gulf of Mexico to the St. Johns River.

Gordon served as president of the Charles Town St. Cecilia Society, an organization formed to support the performance of musical recitals, including the hiring of musicians. The first St. Cecilia Society advertisement to recruit musicians appeared in The South Carolina and American General Gazette of 10–17 April 1771. The text is dated 11 April.

== Family ==
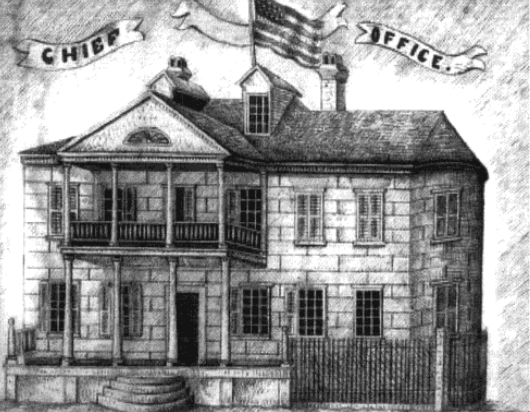
Picture, c. 1863, of two-story tabby house built by John Gordon at the corner of Carteret and Bay Streets in Beaufort, South Carolina

John Gordon married Elizabeth Wright, his first wife, in St. Helena's Parish Church at Beaufort in 1751. They had two daughters, Elizabeth and Sarah; their two other children died in infancy. His eldest daughter, Elizabeth Gordon, married Joseph Smith, a son of William Smith, Justice of the Supreme Court of New York, in New York in 1770.

On March 10, 1767, Gordon married his second wife, Catherine Smith (1743–1775), a daughter of the same William Smith. She died December 8, 1776 and was buried in the graveyard of the Circular Church in Charleston. After her death in 1775, Gordon returned to Great Britain with his children, and died in 1788 at Bordeaux, France, where he had accompanied an invalid relative. His younger children resided with and were reared by their father's family. Two of his three daughters by Catherine, i.e., Mary and Jane, married the brothers, James and Edwin Gairdner, and had issue.

John Gordon's only son to survive infancy was Adam Gordon (1770–1841), borne by his second wife, Catherine. Adam was educated at the private school of Dr. John Carr in Hertford, worked for the Colonial Office in London and married Amelia Watts, dying without issue in Manchester Square, Middlesex, April 1841.

John Gordon died at Bordeaux on March 4, 1778, while his wife Catherine had died on December 15, 1775. Gordon's will, dated 28 July 1774, in Bristol, left "all and singular his lands in East Florida" to William Greenwood and William Higginson, two merchants of London. They were entrusted to pursue his long-standing claim for compensation from the Crown for those lands, and to use the proceeds to settle his debts to the estate of John Macqueen, deceased, and others. Greenwood and Higginson were appointed executors.

A codicil to the will, dated 4 December 1777, at Westminster, gave his two daughters by his first marriage, Elizabeth and Sarah, a tract of land in Prince William Parish in South Carolina, and one hundred pounds sterling to his sister-in-law Margaret Smith. The legatees in trust, John Smith of Georgia and Thomas Forbes of Charles Town, were charged with selling the estate to pay his debts, and the rest to be divided between his children Mary, Adam, Caroline and Jane. He appointed John Smith, Thomas Forbes, William Panton, and John Torrans his executors in America, and joined Grey Elliott, formerly of Georgia, and now of Knightsbridge, county Middlesex, with Greenwood and Higginson as executors in Great Britain only.
