= William Panton =

Scottish merchant

William Panton (c. 1740 – 26 February 1801) was the head of a group of five Scottish merchants who in 1783 founded the powerful and influential trading firm of Panton, Leslie & Company at St. Augustine, then the capital of British East Florida. They formed a partnership to trade with the Native Americans of Florida and the Spanish borderlands on the southern frontier of the British colonies. By 1795 the company had established a monopoly on trade with the Native American tribes of what is now the southeastern United States, sanctioned by successive governors of Spanish Florida.

== Early years in America ==
Panton, the son of John Panton and Barbara Wemyss, was born on the family farm at the Mains of Aberdour on the south coast of the Moray Firth in Aberdeenshire, Scotland. Panton emigrated to Charleston, South Carolina, with his countryman, Thomas Forbes, in 1765. He got into the Indian trade as an apprentice with the firm of John Gordon, a Scots immigrant from Aberdeenshire who established a vast trade network in South Carolina, Georgia, and Florida during the 1760s. Panton served as Gordon's clerk from 1765 until 1772, when Gordon appointed him as one of his attorneys. Forbes was Gordon's maternal nephew. In 1774 Panton and Philip Moore formed a partnership that lasted for several years, and in 1776 Panton started his own trading house with Thomas Forbes in Savannah known as Panton, Forbes and Company. They began to trade with the growing population of white colonists, and speculated in lands, acquiring large tracts in both Carolina and Georgia. Soon after the American revolution broke out, they being determined loyalists, their properties were confiscated. They migrated to East Florida, now a British province and rapidly developing with the infusion of British capital and enterprise, and established themselves on the St. Marys River.

In December 1775, the British governor of East Florida, Patrick Tonyn, appointed Panton official trader for the Creek Indians, and in 1778 the British Indian agent, Col. Thomas Brown, charged Panton with responsibility for the giving of presents to the Creeks and Cherokees, a necessary part of diplomacy with the Indian tribes. The company also specialized in fur trading, more specifically deerskins, which was a vital industry for Native tribes in the region. On 10 January 1783, Panton received a license signed by Governor Tonyn, Brig. Gen. Archibald McArthur, commander of British forces in East Florida, and Thomas Brown, Superintendent of Indian Affairs, to carry on trade with the Indians and supply them with British manufactures.

== Trading in Spanish Florida ==
With the recession of the Floridas to Spain on 20 February 1783, Panton was allowed to remain in the province by agreement between the British officers and Manuel de Zéspedes, the Spanish governor. He had insinuated himself into the good graces of Zéspedes, who interceded on his behalf at the Spanish court. By royal orders of the Spanish Crown in March 1786, Panton, Leslie & Company were authorized to continue to trade with the Indians in the Floridas. They did a large mercantile business in St. Augustine, managed by John Leslie, and were generally employed by the Spaniards to furnish goods and lend funds. Some of the partners of the firm were permitted to purchase lands and to hold them in East Florida. John Leslie presented himself on behalf of Panton, Leslie & Co., and declared the four principals of the house to be William Panton and Thomas Forbes, Charles Maclatchy, and himself, and that the company owned 72,820 acres of land in the province.

Later in 1783, Panton and William Alexander moved to Nassau in the Bahamas, which then became the center of the firm's operations, where it stored trade items in large warehouses.

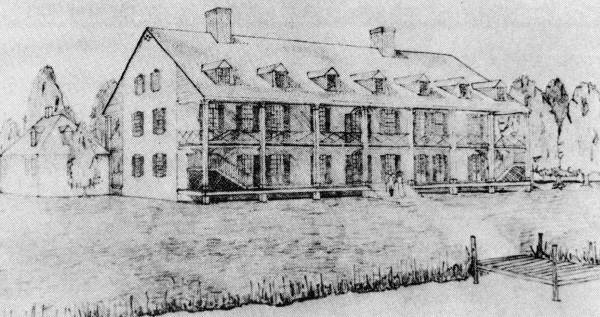
Panton, Leslie & Company headquarters in Pensacola

In April 1785, Panton and John Forbes arrived in Spanish Pensacola with a hastily loaded cargo of goods from Nassau. They established the new house headquarters in the settlement as its volume of trade exceeded that of the St. Augustine branch. According to the Spanish census of 1786, Panton, Leslie and Company owned nineteen separate land grants, as well as 250 enslaved Africans, most of them working on its plantations and ranches. In February 1789, Panton gained the Choctaw and Chickasaw trade at Mobile with the failure of Mather and Strother, a competitor firm based in New Orleans.

By 1795 the company monopolized trade with the Native American tribes in the southeast, its presence reaching northward from Pensacola to Fort San Fernando (formerly known as Chickasaw Bluffs) on the site of present-day Memphis, and westward as far as New Orleans, with posts at Mobile and several locations in Florida, the Bahamas, and around the Caribbean.

== Largest mercantile company in the Old Southwest ==
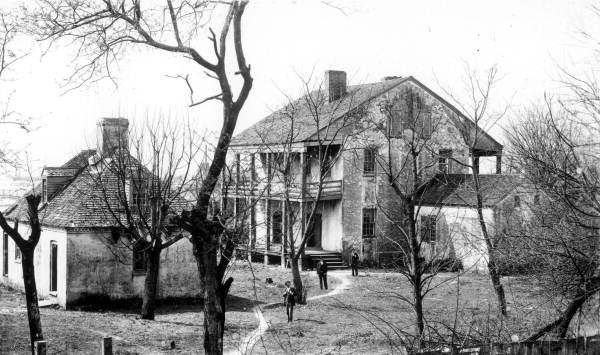
View of the north and east sides of the old Panton, Leslie & Company warehouse, converted into a residence for John Innerarity in 1806. The hipped roof building in the left foreground is the kitchen of the William Panton mansion, which was destroyed in a fire in 1848 (courtesy of the Pensacola Historical Society).

Panton, Leslie & Company made a fortune in the Indian trade and would become the largest mercantile company on the southern frontier in the 1790s. Working in partnership with Alexander McGillivray, they were able to expand their operations from East Florida and the Bahamas to the Mississippi River. McGillivray, an influential chief of the Upper Creek (Muscogee) towns, was an intimate associate of Panton and is generally considered to have been a silent partner in the firm. Panton had promised him a one-fifth share of the company's profits once it obtained Spanish approval. McGillivray, always sickly, died in 1793, and was buried with Masonic honors in Panton's garden at Pensacola on 18 February of that year.

The firm fixed prices to undersell its competitors in Georgia and South Carolina, dispatched agents throughout the Indian country, and carried Spanish government communiques among the tribes. Although Panton, Leslie & Company were a legitimate trading firm, they smuggled goods across the border and manipulated the market to their advantage in other ways, practices probably common to any trading firm operating on the frontier at the time. After the deaths of William Panton and John Leslie, the company was reorganized in 1804 as John Forbes & Company.

== Death ==
In January 1801, Panton came down with a serious illness at Pensacola, and acting on medical advice to seek a change of climate immediately, he sailed for Havana attended by his physician, Dr. Reeves Fowler, on the company schooner Shark. They left in haste, even though his letters of recommendation had not yet arrived. The Cuban authorities refused to allow him to disembark without such papers, on account of the ongoing war between Spain and Great Britain. He continued toward Nassau, but died at sea on 26 February, and was buried at Great Harbour Cay, the major island of the Berry Islands in the Bahamas.
