= Bowlegs Town =

Bowleg's Town Florida was a Seminole village along the Suwannee River

Coordinates: 29.569°N 82.970°W

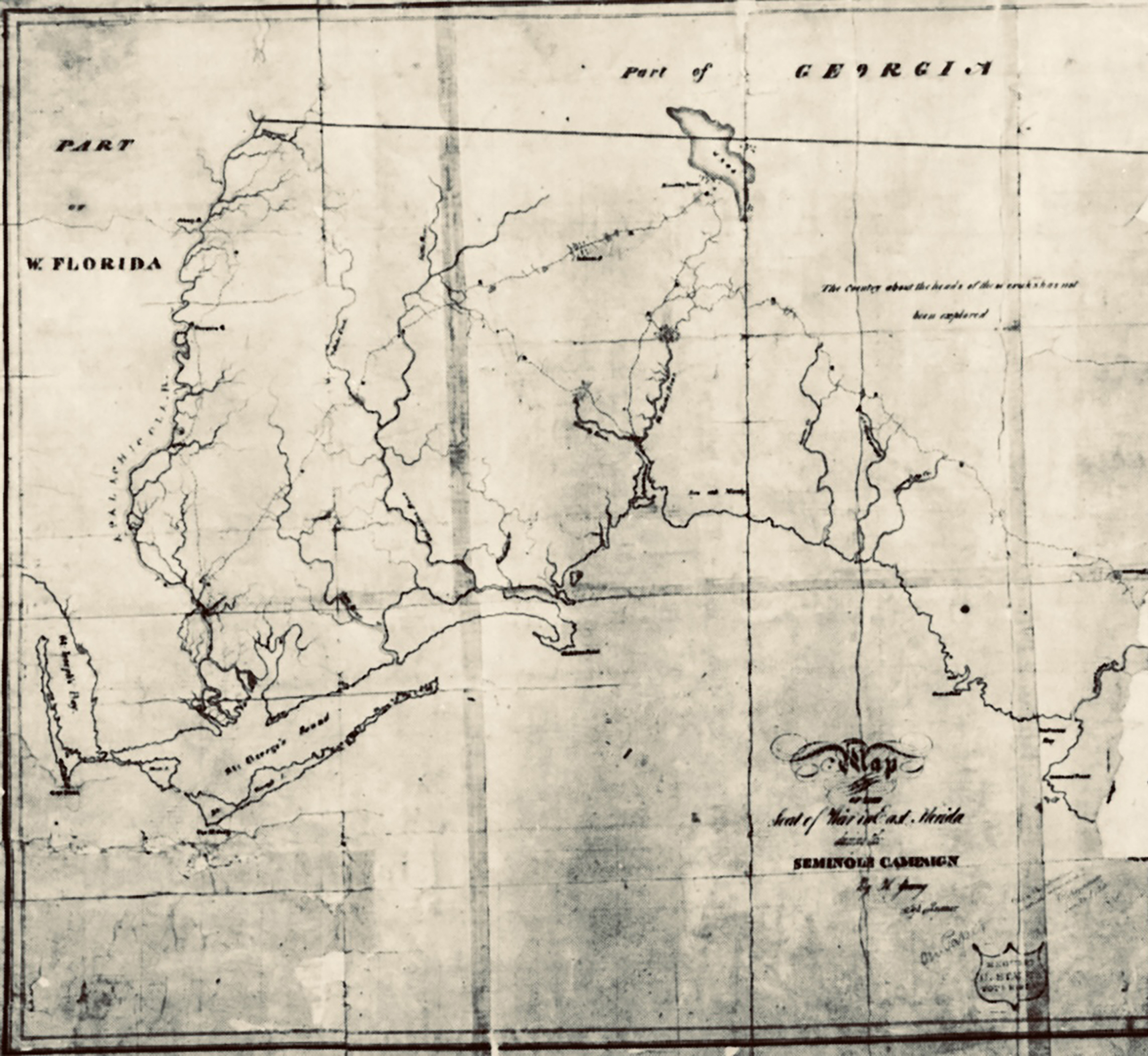
Andrew Jackson's route in the First Seminole War, to Bowleg's Town.

Bowlegs Town refers to a Native American settlement on the Suwannee River near present-day Old Town, Florida. It was formed in 1813 by Bolek (Bowlegs) after his brother King Payne was killed during the invasions of the Patriot War and both of their towns in the Alachua savanna had been destroyed. There had been some Muscogee (Creek) settlement in the area prior to this, and it possibly already bore the name "Old Town". However, it grew in prominence after the arrival of the refugees of the Patriot War (Florida), and especially after another wave of refugees arrived following the destruction of Negro Fort in 1816. These Maroons rebuilt their homes, farms, and military structure in an armed village adjacent to Bowlegs' own village. It was a desire to put down this free black resistance, as much as a desire to scatter the Seminole, which drove Andrew Jackson to march on Bowlegs Town in 1818 and destroy it.

The site has been located on the property of rancher Dale Herring, and as recently as 2016 archeological investigations were being made and artifacts uncovered.

== First Seminole War ==
Prior to the outbreak of hostilities, Bowlegs (Bolek) (not to be confused with Billy Bowlegs of the Second and Third Seminole Wars) was apprehensive about the hostile attention which the Maroon resistance was bringing to his part of East Florida, even acquiescing to external pressure to order the return of those fleeing slavery. However, the encouragement of British officers like Edward Nicolls, George Woodbine, and Robert Ambrister with the Corps of Colonial Marines; the continual encroachment of American settlers; and the Red Stick and Maroon victims of that expansion joining his community all served to radicalize him against the Americans. When Prospect Bluff was destroyed and a wave of Maroons struck out to find a place to rebuild their free communities, some went down to the Tampa Bay area (see Angola), but roughly 400 fighters and their families were permitted to settle nearby to Bowleg's Town. There they organized under Bowlegs' chief black advisor Nero, built sturdy log cabins with fenced in gardens, and resumed drilling vigorously under a self-selected corps of officers, determined to have their revenge and defend their freedom once and for all against all comers.

The frontier skirmishes continued through 1817, and Spain refused to relinquish Florida to the U.S. Finally, Jackson was ordered over the border to pacify the region. His primary goals were to scatter the allied Creek, Miccosukee and Seminole from the contested territory, put down the black resistance, and expel the British agents supporting them both. Ever since the War of 1812, Nicolls and his proxies had supported the Maroons and Seminole with supplies, insisted that the Indian lands were to be returned under the Treaty of Ghent (see also Treaty of Nicolls Outpost), and organized ex-slaves as British subjects and equip them to fight for their freedom. This was infuriating to slavers and settlers in the American south. Abolitionist British adventures were seen as inciting a race war where there should have been easy domination. Hatred of Nicolls and Woodbine, and later Arbuthnot and Ambrister, was a powerful force motivating the Americans to War.

In March, Jackson set out, constructed a new fort at Prospect Bluff and pillaged several Seminole towns on the way to St. Marks. There he captured and summarily hung two Native American Chiefs, and arrested Arbuthnot, but not before the latter dispatched a letter to warn Bowlegs. "The main drift of the Americans, is to destroy the black population of Suwany. Tell my friend, Boleck, that it is throwing away his people to attempt to resist such a powerful force." However, the blacks were "in a complete fix for fighting", and Ambrister himself was about to lead this defense, but concluded that he could not risk the wrath of the Americans, and removed himself (see also the Arbuthnot and Ambrister incident).

== Battle of Suwannee ==
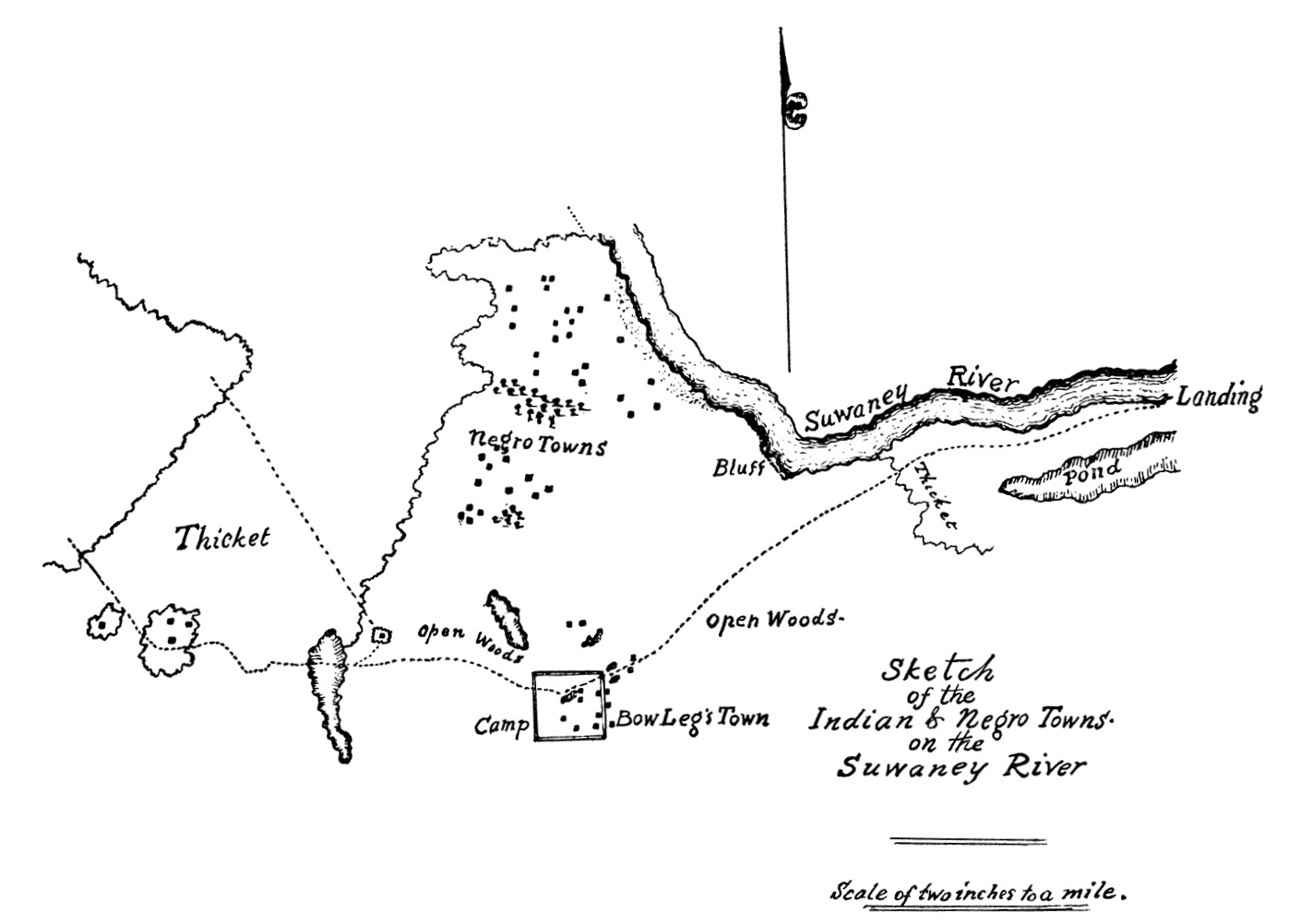
Captain Hugh Young's Sketch Map, drawn during the Seminole War

On April 16, 1818, Jackson's army arrived after an engagement with Lower Creek refugees at the Econfina River (see Peter McQueen and the Battle of Econfina River) and the destruction of the Native American settlement at Tallahassee and Miccosukee. The non-combatants and most of the Alachua Seminole, along with as much property as possible, evacuated to the east side of the river ahead of the attack; for many of them this was not the first time they had lost their home to a Creek and American invasion. The Creek vanguard arrived just as this was nearing completion, and 200-300 Maroons fought a stiff rear guard defense. Outnumbered 4 to 1, with muskets against rifles, they held off the onslaught for a few crucial minutes before diving into the river themselves. Despite exaggerations by contemporary newspapers, they appear to have suffered only 11 dead and 2 captured, wounding an equal number of their attackers.

The deserted town was occupied and looted for a couple of days after the battle, and one night Ambrister wandered right into Jackson's hands, assuming the campfires and undemolished village meant that it had not been taken. With the two most hated British interlopers in hand, Maroon independence crushed, and the Seminole in flight, Jackson declared victory and returned to Fort San Marcos de Apalache to see Ambrister and Arbuthnot put on trial, and then put to death.

Their execution, and the invasion of Spanish Florida, was provoking to the American, British, and Spanish nations, but a congressional committee eventually cleared the wildly popular General Jackson. The British government had never officially approved of the adventures in Florida, and refused to risk their shaky peace with the U.S. over the honor of two men. And far from being able to respond, Spain was finally induced to sell Florida to the U.S. with the Adams–Onís Treaty in 1819, whereupon Jackson became its de facto governor.
