= Battle of Econfina River =

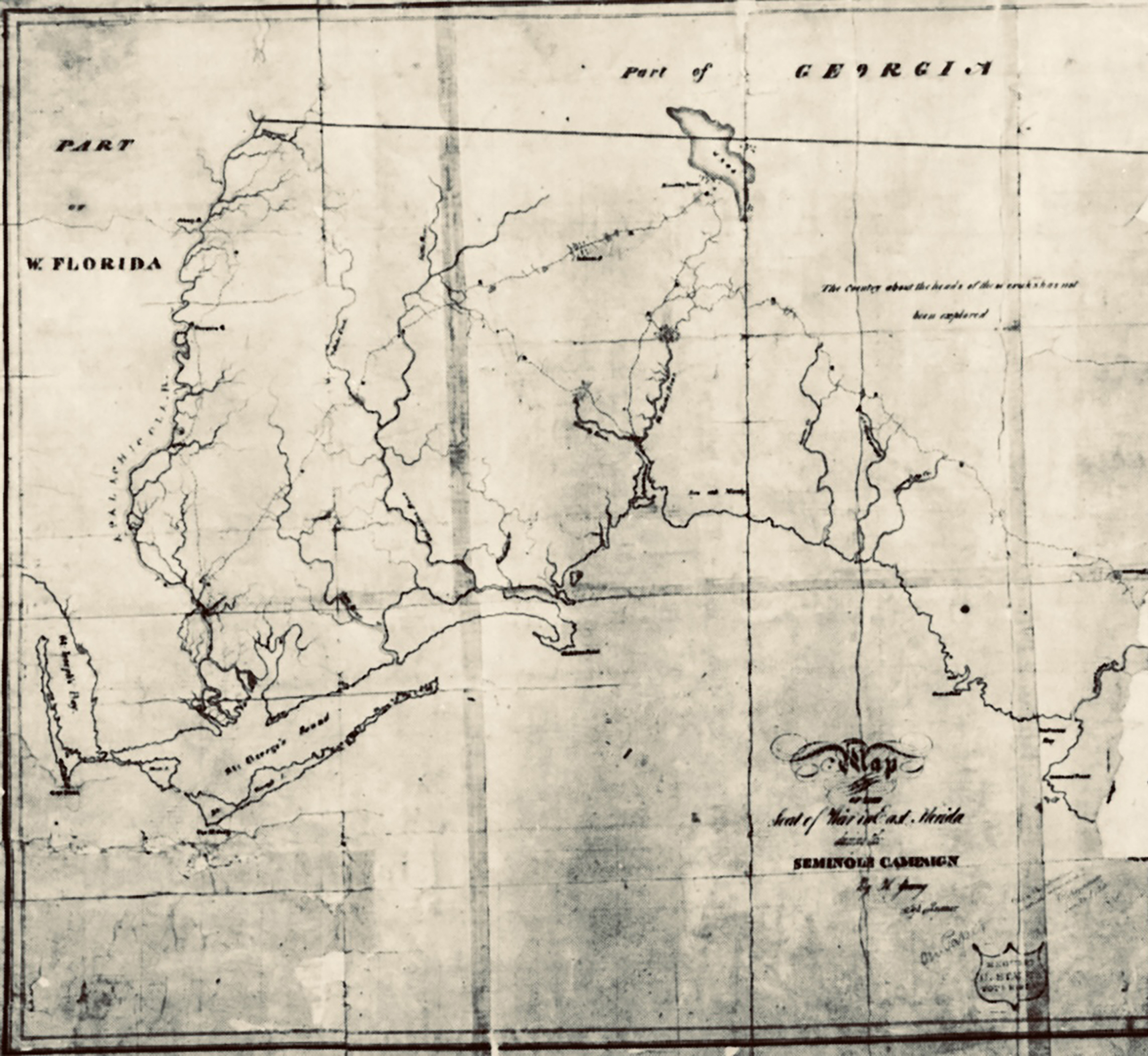
Topographer Hugh Young's 1818 map of the route of Andrew Jackson's army during his invasion of Spanish Florida in the First Seminole War.

The Battle of Econfina River occurred on April 12, 1818, during Andrew Jackson's 1818 invasion of Spanish Florida (now known as the First Seminole War). The battle was fought along the Econfina River in today's Taylor County, Florida. The battle broke out in the morning as Jackson's army marched from the Spanish fortification San Marcos de Apalache towards Bowleg's Town. A force led by Peter McQueen, a noted Red Stick war chief from Tallassee was discovered by Jackson's troops.

== Background ==
Following the Creek War of 1813-1814, Native American refugees from that conflict went into exile in Spanish Florida. One of the rendezvous points for these people was in the Apalachicola River valley (see Blountstown, Florida). During the War of 1812 the British established two military posts along the river; one at Prospect Bluff and the other near modern day Chattahoochee, Florida. Following the Treaty of Ghent, British regulars and many of the Corps of Colonial Marines were evacuated to other British colonies while the arms of these military installations were left with a contingent of the Colonial Marines (see the Treaty of Nicolls Outpost). The British post with the remaining contingent of Colonial Marines thus became known as the Negro Fort. The fort was considered a haven for Maroons from the United States. In April 1816, Andrew Jackson informed Spanish Governor José Masot of West Florida that if he did not eliminate the Negro Fort, Jackson would. The governor replied that he did not have the forces to take the fort.

Over the next two years a series of hostile actions in the region (Battle of Negro Fort, Battle of Fowltown, the Scott massacre, Battle of Ocheesee) would lead to Jackson's incursion into Spanish Florida in March 1818. The First Seminole War saw Jackson's army and his allied Lower Creek warriors led by William McIntosh march down the Apalachicola to build the new Fort Gadsden as well as destroy the Native American settlements at Tallahassee and Miccosukee.

== Battle ==
"On yesterday morning Major Kinard having been ordered with a small party on a scout discovered a number of camps. He immediately dispatched a runner to inform General McIntosh of the circumstance, who took a party of his Warriors and marched towards them on the expectation of surprising them. On approaching the camp, we discovered the Indians who saw us about at the same moment. They were encamped in the Vicinity of a very large swamp and upon being charged upon by the left flank commanded by Major Kinard they immediately retreated into it." - William Stephen Mitchell to Andrew Jackson, April 13, 1818.

"Being sheltered by the thickness of the swamp, they sustained our fire for the space of half an hour when they commenced their retreat through the swamp closely pursued by our Indians and a part of the Tennessee Volunteer Cavalry who had accidentally remained in the rear and had joined us after driving the hostiles through the swamp. They made a desperate but short stand at a small pond, whence they were driven, and continued a retreating fight for about 3 miles. The firing lasted for about 3 hours." -William Stephen Mitchell to Andrew Jackson, April 13, 1818

McQueen's warriors, were trying to get their noncombatants, livestock, and supplies to safety. Brig. Gen. William McIntosh's warriors from the U.S. Creek regiment heavily outnumbered the Red Sticks, but the fight did not go easily. A company of mounted Tennessee militia joined the battle, the combined force slowly pushing McQueen's warriors through the swamp. The battle finally broke when ammunition ran short for the Red Sticks. Forced into a more rapid retreat, they were flanked and overwhelmed by McIntosh's line.

"The Enemy lost 37 killed, 6 men and 98 women and Children taken prisoners. We took from them a number of horses and hogs, a quantity of corn & about 500 head of Cattle. Our loss was 3 killed and 4 wounded, non-dangerously. Genl. McIntosh killed 3 himself and took one prisoner. Major Kennard retook a white woman who had been taken from the boat in which Lieut. Scott and his party were massacred." - William Stephen Mitchell to Andrew Jackson, April 13, 1818.

== Aftermath ==
The Battle of Econfina River ended after three hours and over a distance of three miles of fighting. The outcome was disastrous for McQueen, who escaped with as many of his people as possible. They fell back toward the coast to protect themselves from Jackson's army and eventually made their way south to the Tampa Bay area (see Angola, Florida).

Almost 40 Red Stick warriors were slain and nearly 100 Native American women and children were captured while only 3 American troops and allied warriors were reported killed and 5 wounded in the skirmish. Elizabeth Stewart, an American woman taken prisoner in the Scott Battle of 1817 was rescued during the battle.

Among the Red Stick captives was a sister of Peter McQueen who had once been married to a British trader by the last name of Powell and her son who was known at the time as Billy Powell. He would've been around the age of 9 years old at the time of the battle and during the Second Seminole War would become known as the famed warrior, Osceola.

Apparently, Powell's mother (or grandmother), secured his and other family members release by Jackson for promising to secure McQueen's surrender. Allegedly, the family fled to the Okeefenokee Swamp where they eventually learned that McQueen and his followers had resettled in the Peace River valley (see also Lake Hancock) and subsequently moved there to join him.

Jackson's troops proceeded to their primary objective of the villages of Alachua Seminole Chief Bolek, and the many refugee Maroons from the Battle of Negro Fort, near modern day Old Town, Florida.

== Location ==
The site of the Battle of Econfina River is not an officially marked historic site. However, based on Captain Hugh Young's 1818 topographical description, it is thought to be located in the current Natural Well Tract of public land preserved by the Suwannee River Water Management District. According to the SRWMD the Natural Well Tract is located north of U.S. Highway 98 and can be accessed from Ralph Whiddon Road in Taylor County, FL.
