= Angola, Florida =

Former community of escaped slaves in US

- Ghost town
- Country: United States
- State: Florida
- Region: Tampa Bay area
- Established: 1815
- Extinct: 1821

Angola, Florida, was a prosperous agricultural community of Maroons (escaped slaves) who had close relations with disaffected Indigenous Red Sticks tribe that existed in the Tampa Bay area following the War of 1812, the Patriot War, the Creek War and the First Seminole War. The community was destroyed after Florida became a U.S. territory in 1821.

== History ==
Spanish Florida was a haven for escaped slaves and for Native Americans deprived of their traditional lands during colonial times and in the first decades of U.S. independence. The Underground Railroad ran south during this period.

Autonomous Maroon communities developed in Spanish Florida, though not simultaneously. Fort Mose was the first and smallest autonomous black community, but it was abandoned in 1763 after the Spanish ceded Florida following the Seven Years' War. Fort Mose was heavily influenced by neighboring St. Augustine.

Following the Treaty of Ghent, in 1815, British officials transported around 80 black veterans (Corps of Colonial Marines) of the War of 1812 to the Tampa Bay area. Other Colonial Marine veterans and their families were transported to other British colonies.

Another community was at Prospect Bluff on the Apalachicola River, but it was destroyed by forces under the command of General Edmund P. Gaines in 1816 (Battle of Negro Fort). The refugees from this tragic event, including Maroons from the surrounding plantations who were not at the Fort, moved east to the Suwannee River valley and recreated their communities outside Bowlegs Town, named after Alachua Seminole leader Bolek (Bowlegs). During General Andrew Jackson's invasion of Spanish Florida during the First Seminole War, the Maroons successfully defended the evacuation of the settlements before they were destroyed. Archeological digs have recently begun at the site of Bowlegs Town, near present day Old Town.

According to historian Canter Brown Jr., "Most Maroon settlements were tiny because people needed to escape detection. Angola's 600 to 750 people was an incredible size back then, and shows that these were capable people." He described it as "one of the most significant historical sites in Florida and perhaps the U.S."

At the State Library and Archives of Florida, the Spanish Land Grant applications for both Jose Maria Caldez and Joaquin Caldez, each list Angola as on the north side of the Oyster River, respectively eight and nine miles from Tampa Bay. The location of Angola on the Oyster River as described by local history author Janet Snyder Matthews, was in "southern Sarasota Bay, eight miles from Tampa Bay." In the footnotes to Edge of Wilderness, Matthews speculated that the "Oyster River of Caldes which may have been present-day Whitaker Bayou or Hudson Bayou."

In his book The Territory of Florida, John Lee Williams described "a stream that enters the bay joining the entrance of Oyster River, on the S.W. it was ascended for six miles." Williams goes on to describe the land along this smaller stream and then refers to "the point between these two rivers is called Negro Point." He concluded that the "ruins" on the "old fields" of this "plantation here cultivated by two hundred negroes" belonged to the "famous Arbuthnot and Ambrister." Also, he described the shore of "Sarrazota Bay" as "rocky and high" and on the eastern shore with "extensive old fields, of rich land" including the "ruins of fifteen old houses." Among the "old gardens" of these ruins, Williams examined in 1828 and reported finding "among luxuriant weeds, tomatoes, lima beans, and many aromatic herbs perfectly naturalized." His accompanying map was published in 1837.

=== Destruction ===
When Andrew Jackson became Florida's de facto territorial governor in 1821, he decided that the refugee Maroons and Red Sticks near Tampa Bay would need to be destroyed and their runaway slave populace returned to bondage. Without the official backing of the U.S. government, Jackson decided to employ Creek allies to raid in Florida instead. "Acting in direct defiance of Secretary of War John C. Calhoun, Jackson's first order of business was to send his Coweta Creek allies (see William McIntosh) on a search and destroy mission against Angola", which was "burned to the ground".

The result of the raid was "terror" all over Florida, and many of the Maroons who could went to Cape Florida and left for the Bahamas. Those Maroons who had been present at Prospect Bluff, especially the discharged Colonial Marines, considered themselves free British subjects, and had been promised protection within British territory like the Bahamas by Nicolls. However, this attitude was not shared by all British leadership. Despite this, they still established a settlement on Andros Island, named Red Bays in 1821 (see Nicolls Town).

A small number of the surviving Red Sticks (see Peter McQueen) joined other Lower Creeks refugees and formed a community called Minatti at the headwaters of the Peace River near Lake Hancock.

Many Maroons and Black Seminoles displaced from Angola and similar communities by the Second Seminole War stayed in Florida and fought alongside the Seminole Indians, and were deported in kind to Indian territories in Oklahoma. Some migrated even further to El Nacimiento, Coahuila.

== Archaeology ==
Artifacts from the Angola era have been uncovered in Manatee Mineral Springs Park located in Bradenton, Florida along the Manatee River. The full extent of the settlement is unknown, possibly ranging from where the Braden River meets the Manatee River down to Sarasota Bay.

Manatee Mineral Spring was a source of fresh water and, two decades after the destruction of the Maroon community, later the location of the Village of Manatee. The archaeology report by Uzi Baram is on file with the Florida Division of Historical Resources of the Florida Department of State. In 2019, the National Park Service added the excavated location at Manatee Mineral Springs Park to the Network to Freedom. Also of archaeological note is an "African-inspired mahogany drum found in the bank of the Little Manatee River." The drum was found in 1967 and stored at the Florida Museum of Natural History, the artifact has received only minor attention."

== Commemoration ==
In July 2018, the first Back to Angola Festival was held at the Manatee Mineral Springs Park. Descendants of those who had escaped to the Bahamas attended.

== See also ==
- Merikins
- Fort Mose
- Negro Fort
- Prospect Bluff Historic Sites
- List of ghost towns in Florida
