= Bolek =

Seminole principal chief of the Alachua chiefly line

- Boleck, Bolech

Seminole leader
- Preceded by: King Payne
- Succeeded by: Micanopy

Personal details
- Died: 1819
- Relations: King Payne (older brother)
- Parent: Cowkeeper
- Nickname: Bowlegs

Bolek (died 1819), also spelled as Boleck or Bolechs, and known as Bowlegs by European Americans, was a Seminole principal chief, of the Alachua (Oconee) chiefly line. He was probably the younger brother of King Payne, who succeeded their uncle Cowkeeper (known to the Seminole as Ahaya) as leading or principal chief in Florida. Bolek succeeded King Payne in 1812 when he was killed during the Patriot War. After Bolek died in 1819, the Seminole were led by other members of the Cowkeeper dynasty, including Micanopy and Billy Bowlegs.

== Early life and education ==
Bolek was one of several children likely born to Ahaya's (Cowkeeper) sister. He and his older brother King Payne were groomed by Cowkeeper (in the matrilineal kinship system) to become chiefs and take leading roles among the Seminole. They inherited that role through their mother's people, who were descended from the Alachua chiefly line.

Bolek was designated as a village or itwála chief while a young man; he was based on the Suwannee River, near present-day Old Town, Florida. He began to oppose United States influence in Spanish Florida during the early 19th century. He prevented Georgia slaveholders from entering Seminole territory to pursue escaped slaves from the Low Country.

In 1812, Bolek and his brother King Payne began raiding frontier settlements along the Florida-Georgia border. Seminole bands fought several engagements with militia forces; Payne was killed in 1812, and Bolek suffered serious wounds during the same skirmish against Georgia militia forces under Daniel Newnan. An expedition by Colonel John Williams the following year destroyed hundreds of Seminole villages and captured numerous horses and cattle. Border warfare between the Seminole and Georgia settlers contributed to US involvement in the Creek War of 1813-1814.

== Seminole Wars ==
After a year of skirmishing in territory contested under the Treaty of Fort Jackson and the Treaty of Ghent, the First Seminole War began in November 1817, when Andrew Jackson ordered a force to take the village of Fowltown and capture its chief Neamthala. The inhabitants of Fowltown fled and it was destroyed. Following this, Jackson traveled to Prospect Bluff and assembled a combined Creek and American army there, and ordered Fort Gadsden built, next to the ruins of Negro Fort. With 3500 men, Jackson's army set out in March 1818 into northern Florida, burning Kinache's village of Miccosukee and occupying the Spanish settlement of St. Marks, where they captured indian chiefs Josiah Francis and Homothelimico--who were immediately hung, as well as Alexander Arbuthnot.

From there they moved southeast through the Red Stick village of Peter McQueen at the Econfina River, and came to Bowlegs Town, and one of their main targets. A significant number of Maroon warriors from Prospect Bluff had migrated there, and were organized under Bolek's chief black advisor Nero. These Maroons had been training with Robert Ambrister, considered themselves free British subjects, and were seen as the heart of black resistance in the American southeast. The black and Seminole villagers fled the town while the Americans advanced, and the Maroons held them off briefly before fleeing themselves. Jackson occupied the village, and after nightfall, Ambrister wandered in, thinking it was still held by Bolek, and was captured. Jackson burned Bowlegs Town as he left, and transported Ambrister back to St. Marks.

Arbuthnot, a trader, and Ambrister, a military officer, were seen as instigators of the war by the Americans, for organizing the Seminole and Maroons, arming them, and encouraging them to resist American settlement. Jackson had them both executed, which caused an international incident, but Jackson continued his offensive and reoccupied Spanish Pensacola. With the hated Brits Arbuthnot and Ambrister dead, Bowlegs Town scattered, and St. Marks and Pensacola under American control, Jackson felt he had pacified the whole frontier, and that the annexation of florida was inevitable.

Indeed, the U.S. purchased Florida from Spain in 1819 via the Adams-Onis Treaty, and the Seminole expected they would have more to do to try to keep the Americans from their territory. Bolek died that year and was succeeded as principal chief by his maternal grandnephew, Micanopy.

Micanopy was principal chief through the move into central Florida and the Second Seminole War. He also led the Seminole to Indian Territory, realizing that trying to fight the US superior forces was finally futile. In the West, he worked to gain separate territory and independence for the Seminole from Creek oversight until his death in 1849.

He was succeeded by his sister's son, John Jumper, who died in 1853. John's younger brother, Jim Jumper, succeeded as principal chief, leading the Seminole in Indian Territory until after the American Civil War, when the United States government began to interfere with tribal succession.

Preceded by King Payne	Leading chief of the Seminoles; 1812–1819	Succeeded by Micanopy
