= Billy Bowlegs =

19th-century Seminole chief and military leader

- Hvlpvtv Mēkko
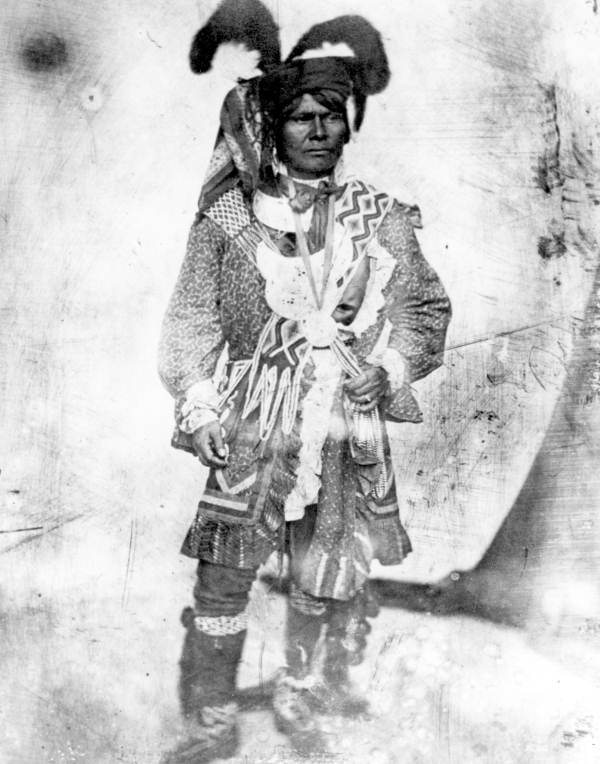
- Billy Bowlegs during his visit to Washington, D.C. in 1852

Personal details
- Born: c. 1810 Paynes Prairie, Florida
- Died: c. 1859 (aged 48-49) Oklahoma, United States
- Mother tongue: Muscogee

Holata Micco (Creek: Hvlpvtv Mēkko (Note: also spelled Halpatter-Micco, Halbutta Micco, Halpuda Mikko) transl. Alligator Chief; known in English as Chief Billy Bowlegs or Billy Bolek; c. 1810 – 1859) was a leader of the Seminoles in Florida during the Second Seminole War and was the remaining Seminole's most prominent chief during the Third Seminole War, when he led the Seminoles' last major resistance against the United States government. With the possibilities of military victory dwindling, he finally agreed to relocate with his people to Indian Territory (present-day Oklahoma) in 1858. As part of the settlement, he was paid $6,500 plus $1,000 each for the subchiefs and $100 each for the women and children who went with him. Several sources claim that he is buried at the Fort Gibson National Cemetery, but it is disputed whether the grave marked "Captain Billy Bowlegs" is actually his or that of a different Billy Bowlegs.

== Early life and Seminole Wars ==
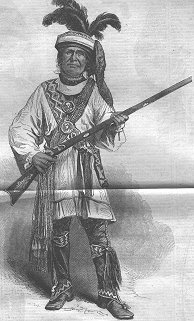
Billy Bowlegs, 1858

Bowlegs was born into a family of hereditary chiefs descended from Cowkeeper of the Oconee tribe of the Seminole in the village of Cuscowilla on the Alachua savannah (present-day Payne's Prairie, near Micanopy, Florida). His father's name was Secoffee, while it is thought that the chief Micanopy was his uncle. The surname "Bowlegs" may be an alternate spelling of Bolek, the name of a preceding Seminole chief. (A story that he had bowlegs from riding horses is unsubstantiated.)

Although Bowlegs signed the Treaty of Payne's Landing of 1832, he refused to leave Florida. He wasn't well-noted at the beginning of the Second Seminole War (roughly, 1835 to 1842).

On July 7, 1837, it is alleged that Bowlegs gave orders for the Wild's family of Ware County, Georgia to be massacred. After the attack, he and his warriors returned to the Florida Territory after spending some time on Billy's Island, in the Okefenokee Swamp, evading justice.

After the capture (under a flag of truce offered by Gen. Thomas Jesup) and subsequent deaths of Osceola and Micanopy, amidst the loss of other prominent Seminole chiefs, Bowlegs and his band of 200 warriors became some of the most prominent fighters surviving at the time hostilities ended on August 14, 1842. To impress and awe the Seminole chiefs, the US government brought Bowlegs to Washington, D.C. to underline the power of the United States.

Bowlegs and his band lived in relative peace until 1855 (see the crisis of 1849). A group of army engineers and surveyors were ordered into his territory in southwestern Florida, where they destroyed crops and other property in the course of building forts. Some historians have viewed these actions as intentional provocation to make Bowlegs react, so the settlers would have a reason to force the Seminole out. If so, the provocation worked: Bowlegs led his warriors in sporadic attacks against settlers for the next few years, in what is known as the Third Seminole War or the 'Billy Bowlegs War." The Army was unable to subdue his guerrilla warfare.

== Relocation ==
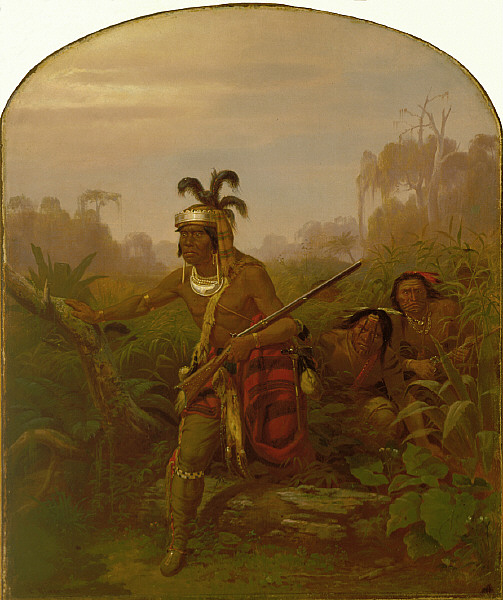
Chief Billy Bowlegs by Karl Ferdinand Wimar, 1861

In early 1858, Chief Wild Cat of the Western Seminole tribe was brought back from Indian Territory to convince Bowlegs to relocate voluntarily. The US government offered Bowlegs $10,000 and each of his chiefs $1,000 if they did so. Warriors and non-warriors were offered less. They initially refused but later that year, the band of 123 agreed to relocation. Billy's Creek in Fort Myers, Florida is named after Bowlegs as this was the spot where he surrendered in 1858.

In May, Bowlegs and his followers arrived in New Orleans, en route to Arkansas and their new home in the Indian Territory. A journalist described the chief as having "two wives, one son, five daughters, and a hundred thousand dollars in hard cash." After reaching Indian Territory, Bowlegs became a leading chief there. He and his daughters became prominent land holders.

== Other "Billy Bowlegs" ==
Sonuk Mikko, aka Billy Bowlegs, gained fame as a captain in the Union Army during the American Civil War. Some historical sources erred in conflating Holato Micco and the later Sonuk Mikko, who both were called Billy Bowlegs.. A later Seminole elder took the name Billy Bowlegs III.

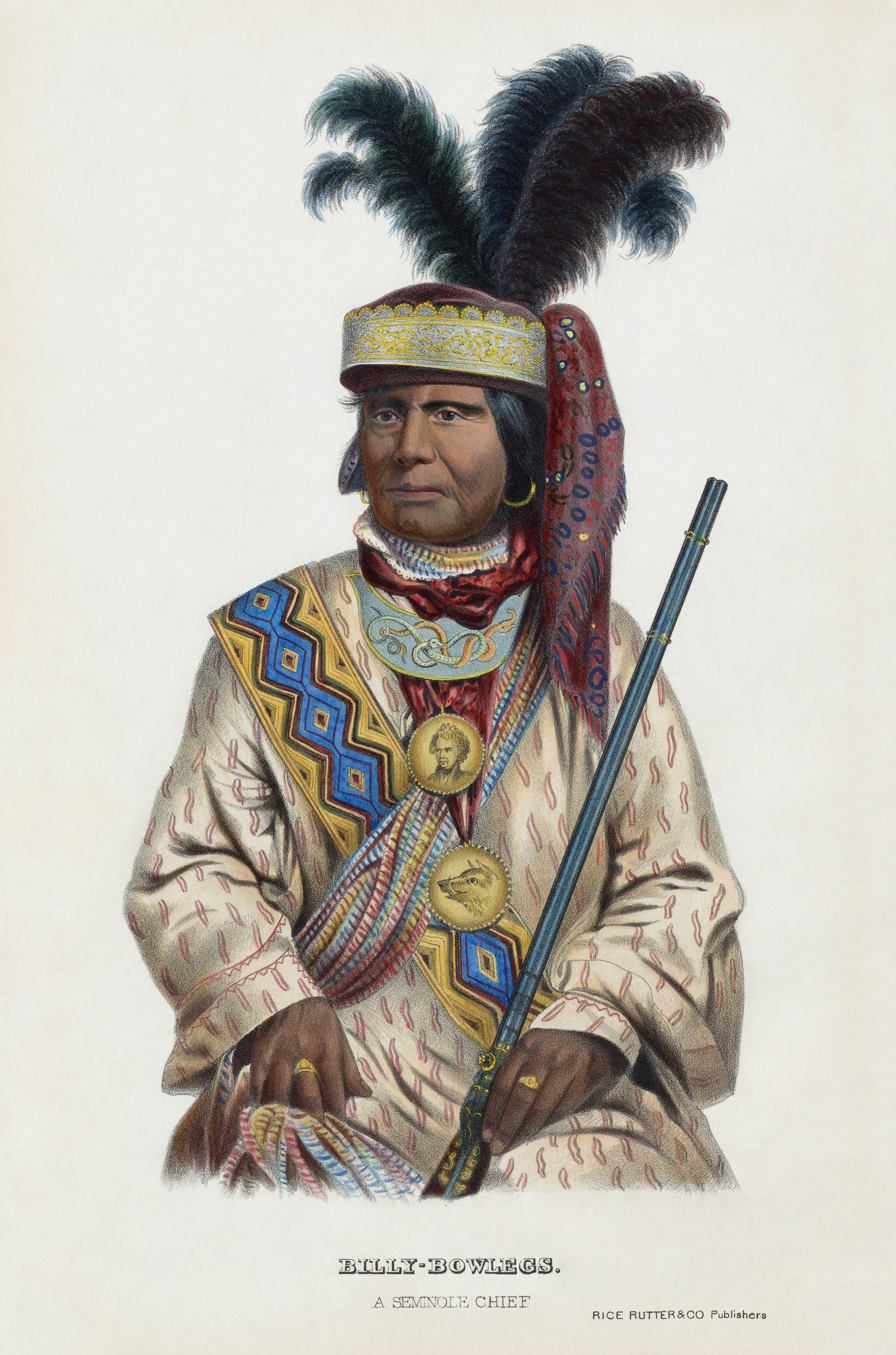
Lithograph of Bowlegs
