= Enoch Kelly Haney =

Native American politician and artist (1940–2022)

Enoch Haney
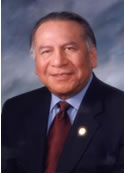

Chief of the Seminole Nation of Oklahoma
- In office 2005–2009
- Preceded by: Kenneth Chambers
- Succeeded by: Leonard Harjo

Member of the Oklahoma Senate
- In office 1986–2002
- Constituency: 50th district 28th district

Member of the Oklahoma House of Representatives
- In office 1980–1986
- Preceded by: Ronald G. Sheppard
- Succeeded by: Jim Morgan
- Constituency: 28th district

Personal details
- Born: Enoch Kelly Haney; November 12, 1940 Seminole, Oklahoma, U.S.
- Died: April 23, 2022 (aged 81) Oklahoma, U.S.
- Party: Democratic
- Education: Bacone College; Oklahoma City University (BFA); University of Arizona

Enoch Kelly Haney (November 12, 1940 – April 23, 2022) was an American politician and internationally recognized Seminole/Muscogee artist from Oklahoma, He served as principal chief of the Seminole Nation of Oklahoma from 2005 until 2009 and previously served as a member of both houses of the Oklahoma Legislature. He created a bronze statue that sits atop the Oklahoma State Capitol, called The Guardian. Another statue he created is located at the Chickasaw Nation headquarters in Ada, Oklahoma.

Haney was also a candidate for the office of Governor of Oklahoma in the 2002 election, placing third in the Democratic Party primary. He died in Oklahoma in 2022 at 81

== Early life and education ==
Enoch Kelly Haney was born on November 12, 1940, in Seminole, Oklahoma, to William Woodrow Haney and Hattie Louise Haney. His father was a flute maker and craftsman and his paternal grandfather, Willie Haney, contributed to the Smithsonian Institution's oral history project and served as Chief of the Seminole Tribe in the 1940s. Haney graduated from Prairie Valley High School in Earlsboro, Oklahoma in 1959, then went on to earn an Associate of Arts degree from Bacone College in Muskogee, Oklahoma and a Bachelor of Fine Arts degree from Oklahoma City University. He attended the University of Arizona on a Rockefeller Foundation Scholarship. He also served in the Oklahoma National Guard. In 1972, he was named as one of the Outstanding Young Men of America. Before he entered politics, he was a Methodist minister.

== Political career ==
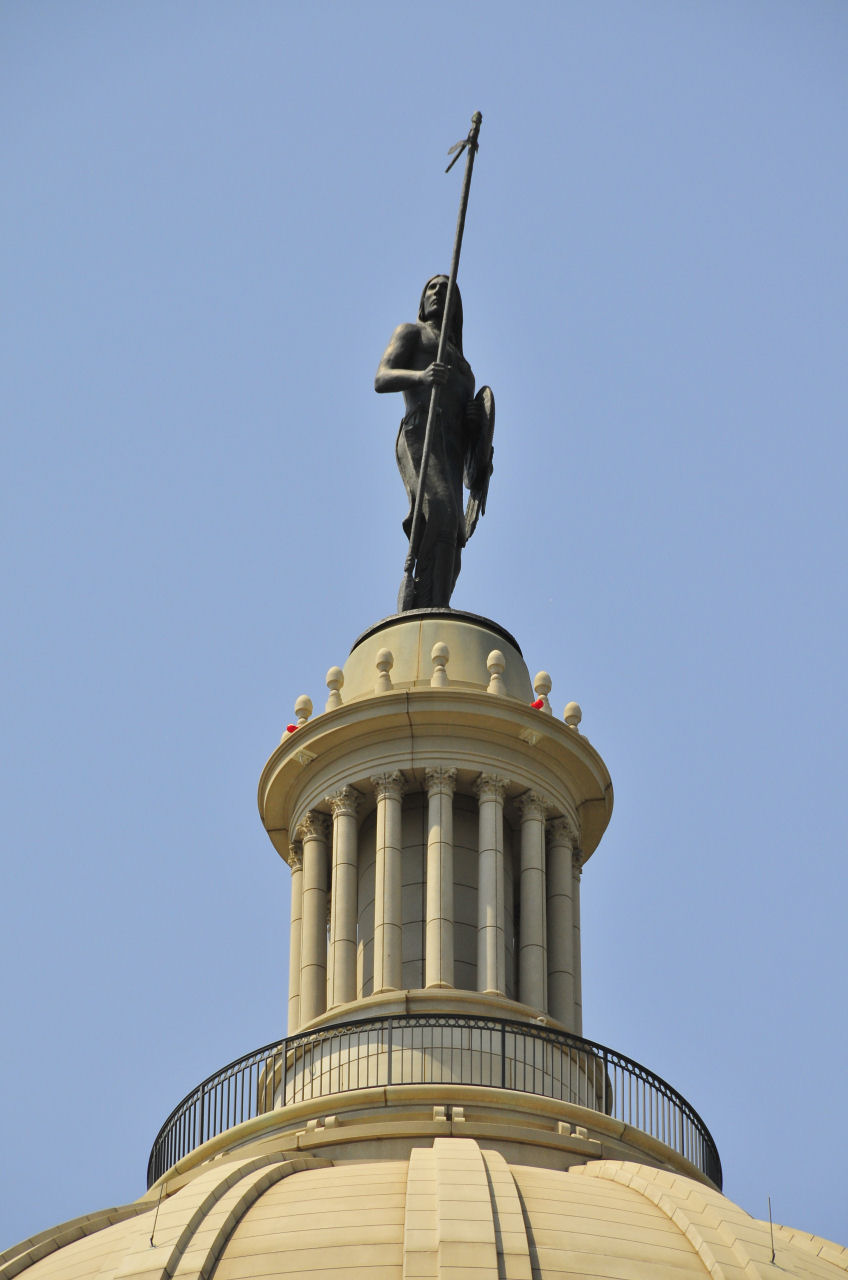
A statue created by Haney sits atop the Oklahoma State Capitol

Prior to becoming Principal Chief of the Seminole Nation of Oklahoma in 2005, Haney served in the Oklahoma Senate from 1986 to 2002. During his tenure in the State Senate, he served as Chairman of the Senate Appropriations Committee. From 1980 to 1986, he served in the Oklahoma House of Representatives, becoming Vice Chairman of the House Appropriations Committee in his second term. He was the first full-blood Native American to serve in either house of the Oklahoma Legislature. Earlier in his career, he had served the Seminole Nation of Oklahoma, as a tribal councilman, band chief, business consultant, and planner.

Haney ran in the Democratic Party's primary election in the 2002 Oklahoma gubernatorial election. He placed third in the primary behind Vince Orza and Brad Henry.

== Artistic career ==
In addition to his political career, Haney was an internationally recognized Native American artist, specializing in paintings and sculpture. He painted in oil, acrylic, and watercolor and drew with pastels, as well as sculpting with bronze. Haney was shown throughout the United States, as well as Malaysia, Singapore, South Korea, and Switzerland. The Five Civilized Tribes Museum declared him a Master Artist in 1976.

Most notably, he created "The Guardian," a 22-foot bronze sculpture which adorns the Oklahoma State Capitol dome. Modeled after Haney's own relatives, "The Guardian" took 10 months to complete, weighs 4,000 pounds, and was erected on June 7, 2002. Seven 7-foot replicas of the statue are located throughout the state.

Haney noted of his sculpture of "The Guardian": “The towering statue exemplifies the valor of Oklahomans and their ability to overcome the most horrific catastrophes such as the bombing at the Alfred P. Murrah Building in Oklahoma City. The Guardian is a reminder that just below him within the halls of our grand Capitol, the true guardians of Oklahoma, our elected officials and others, are working every day to improve this already magnificent state.”

Haney's other artistic accomplishments include the "Chickasaw Warrior" sculpture at the Chickasaw Nation headquarters in Ada, Oklahoma, and the "Standing His Ground" sculpture at Seminole State College in Seminole, Oklahoma.

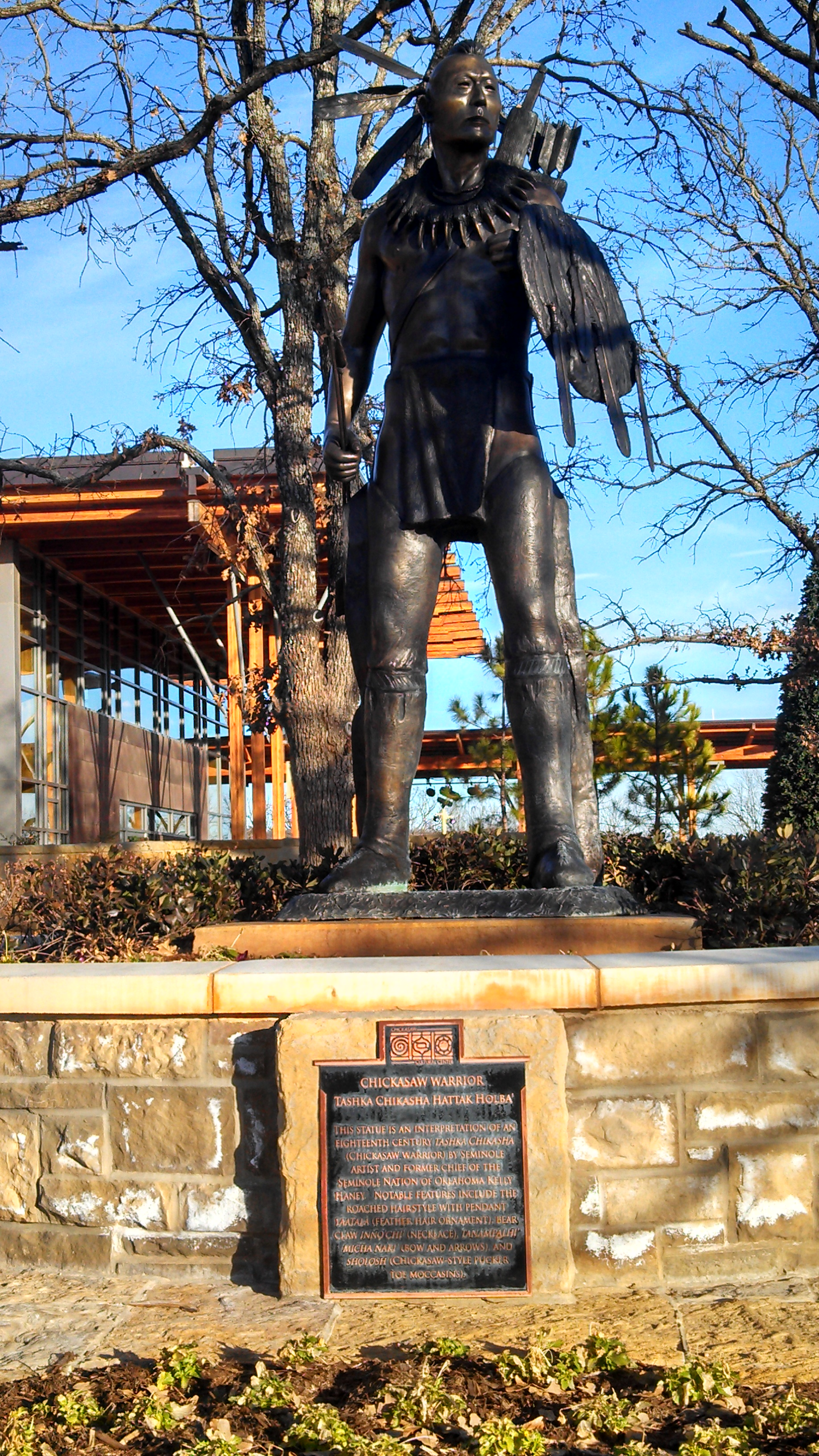
Sculpture of a Chickasaw Warrior at the Chickasaw Cultural Center by Haney

A painting created by Haney entitled "The Earth and I are One" is displayed at the Oklahoma State Capitol.

== Other accomplishments ==
Haney produced and hosted his own weekly television program. He also narrated and worked as a consultant for the Seminole series of the Discovery Channel's 1993 television documentary series, "How the West was Lost." He taught at Oklahoma City University and owned an art gallery, Haney, Inc.

== See also ==
- Five Civilized Tribes Museum
- Oklahoma State Capitol
- Seminole Nation of Oklahoma
- Muscogee (Creek) Nation

Political offices
Preceded by Kenneth Chambers	Chief of the Seminole Nation of Oklahoma; 2005–2009	Succeeded by Leonard Harjo
