= Ahaya =

Seminole Chief (c. 1710 – 1783)

Originally Oconee, later Seminole leader
- Succeeded by: King Payne

Personal details
- Born: ca. 1710
- Died: 1783
- Relations: Sons, Payne and Bowlegs
- Known for: First recorded chief of the Alachua band of the Seminole tribe
- Nickname: Cowkeeper

Ahaya (c. 1710 – 1783) was the first recorded chief of the Alachua band of the Seminole tribe. European-Americans called him Cowkeeper, as he held a very large herd of cattle. Ahaya was the chief of a town of Oconee people near the Chattahoochee River. Around 1750 he led his people into Florida where they settled around Payne's Prairie, part of what the Spanish called tierras de la chua, "Alachua Country" in English. The Spanish called Ahaya's people cimarones, which eventually became "Seminoles" in English. Ahaya fought the Spanish, and sought friendship with the British, allying with them after Spain ceded Florida to Great Britain in 1763, and staying loyal to them through the American Revolutionary War. He died shortly after Britain returned Florida to Spain in 1783.

== Names ==
=== Ahaya ===
The chief of the Alachua band of Seminoles was usually called "Cowkeeper" by the British while they ruled East Florida. William Bartram, who visited the Alachua Seminoles and has provided much of what we know about the man, refers to him only as "the Cowkeeper". John Richard Alden, in his 1944 book John Stuart and the southern frontier, gives Cowkeeper's Oconee name as "Ahaya". ("Ahaya" is a rare Seminole name.) Boyd and Harris also state that the leader of the Alachua Seminoles was known to the English as "Ahaya" or "Cowkeeper".

Some sources state that the Oconees moved to Florida under a chief named "Secoffee", and that it was Secoffee who was called "Cowkeeper". Kenneth Porter argues that Cowkeeper and Secoffee were different people, and finds "nothing to support the claim [that Cowkeeper was Secoffee] and much to disprove it". (Note: Porter identifies "Secoffee" as a variant spelling of "Seepeycoffee", son of Brim, chief of Coweta, one of the founding towns of the Muscogee federation. (Boyd and Harris remark that whites were unable to consistently and accurately render Native American names in writing.) Porter further cites mentions of Seepeycoffee in connection with Brim and his successors. Seepeycoffee was the guardian of Brim's grandson (Seepeycoffee's nephew) Tugulki, who became chief of Coweta in 1755 or 1756. Seepeycoffee accompanied Tugulki to meetings with British and Spanish officials into the 1770s. Porter traces the mistaken identification to John T. Sprague's 1848 book, The origin, progress, and conclusion of the Florida War. John R. Swanton, in his 1922 Early history of the Creek Indians and their neighbors, quotes Daniel G. Brinton's 1859 Notes on the Floridian peninsula about Secoffee leading the Oconees to Florida, and concludes that "Cowkeeper" was Secoffee's nickname. Porter characterizes the story of Secoffee leading the Alachua Seminoles as, "according to Sprague, as paraphrased by Brinton who is then quoted by Swanton".)

=== Alachua ===
The name "Alachua" derives from la Chua, the name of the largest ranch in 17th century Spanish Florida. The center of the hacienda de la Chua was located on a bluff overlooking a sinkhole, now called the "Alachua Sink", that drains Paynes Prairie. There is evidence that the Timucua word for "sinkhole" was chua, meaning that the ranch was named after the sinkhole. The Spanish called a large area in the interior of Florida west of the St. Johns River, tierras de la Chua. English-speakers who ventured into interior Florida called the area "the Alachua Country".

=== Seminole ===
The name "Seminole" likely is derived from the Spanish cimarones, meaning "wild or untamed", as opposed to the Christianized natives who had previously lived in the mission villages of Spanish Florida. (Note: In the 17th century the Spanish in Florida used cimaron to refer to christianized natives who had left their mission villages to live "wild" in the woods.) Some of the Hitchiti- or Mikasukee-speakers who had settled in Florida identified themselves to the British as "cimallon" (Muskogean languages have no "r" sound, replacing it with "l"). The British wrote the name as "Semallone", later "Seminole". The use of "cimallon" by bands in Florida to describe themselves may have been intended to distinguish themselves from the primarily Muskogee-speakers of the Upper Towns of the Muscogee Confederacy (called the "Creek Confederacy" by the British). The term "Seminole" was first applied to Ahaya's band in Alachua. After 1763, when they took over Florida from the Spanish, the British called all natives living in Florida "Seminoles", "Creeks", or "Seminole-Creeks".

While the name "Seminole" was commonly applied by whites to all Native Americans in Florida, even as late as 1842, at the end of the Second Seminole War, US Army officers referred to various bands in Florida as Seminoles, Mikasukis, Tallahassees, Creeks, and Uchees, with "Seminoles" or "Alachua Seminoles" often referring only to the people who had lived around the Alachua Prairie prior to 1813, and owed allegiance to Ahaya and his successors, King Payne, Bolek (Bowlegs) and Micanopy.

== Early life ==
Ahaya was born to the Hitchiti-speaking Oconee, who lived in a town at a site now called "Oconee Old Town", on the Oconee River, in what is now central Georgia. In the late 1720s the Oconee people moved to the Chattahoochee River, among the Hitchiti- and Mikasuki-speaking Lower Towns of the Muscogee Confederacy. (Note: William Bartram visited the site of Oconee Old Town in 1777, and stated that the town had been abandoned about 50 years earlier.) The Oconee move has been attributed to a desire by the Oconees to distance themselves from whites encroaching on their town and hunting grounds.

After the decimation of the Apalachee and Timucua people and the collapse of the Spanish mission network in Florida at the beginning of the 18th century, many peoples of what is now the state of Georgia, including the Oconees, used Florida as a vast hunting ground. Ahaya may have become familiar with the lands surrounding the Alachua Savanna (now known as Paynes Prairie) on hunting trips into Florida. In 1740, James Oglethorpe, the governor of the Province of Georgia, mounted an invasion into Spanish Florida, laying siege to its capitol, St. Augustine. Ahaya, who had become chief of his town, led 45 men to join the siege.

After their defeat in the Yamasee War (1715–1718) against the Province of Carolina, many of the Yamasee people moved to Florida and settled in the vicinity of St. Augustine. The Spanish government tried to entice peoples from the Lower Towns of the Creek Confederacy to move to unoccupied lands in Florida, but were unable to supply enough gifts to satisfy them. The bands of the Lower Towns found the gifts and trade goods of the British to be much more desirable than those of the Spanish, and many continued to join the British in raids into Spanish Florida.

== In Florida ==
The Oconee became unhappy living among the Lower Towns of the Creek Confederacy, perhaps because too many close, sometimes hostile, neighboring towns made it hard to find fresh agricultural land when it became necessary to relocate to new fields. About the year 1750, Ahaya led his people south to Florida, intending to settle somewhere near the Atlantic coast. The Oconee's migration reached the country around the Alachua Savanna, or Paynes Prairie, where they stopped. The area around Paynes Prairie is part of the Middle Florida Hammock Belt, a series of mixed hardwood and pine hammocks with the best soils in central Florida. The Oconee found abundant game and fish in the area, as well as many feral cattle and horses, descendants of the herds on Spanish ranches which had been abandoned early in the 18th century. The herds the Oconee gathered from those feral cattle led the British to call Ahaya "Cowkeeper." The Oconee established a town, called "Alachua", "Latchaway" or "Latchewie", on the edge of the savanna or prairie.

The new town of Alachua soon was one of the three largest established in Florida by people from the Muscogee Confederation. The Oconees in Alachua were joined by Hitchiti-speakers from the towns of Sawokli, Tomathli, Apalachicola, Hitchiti and Chiaha. The various Muskogean-speaking bands, who were coming to be known as Seminoles, continued to harass the Spanish, pushing them back into St. Augustine and San Marcos (on the Gulf coast south of the old Apalachee Province). Ahaya and his band fought the Yamasees and remnants of the Timucua, who were allied with the Spanish. A Seminole tradition held that the Seminoles had killed most of the Yamasee men in a battle near the St. Johns River and married their women. The Alachua Seminoles still owned many Yamasee slaves when Bartram visited them in 1773. In 1757, Ahaya visited lieutenant governor of Georgia Henry Ellis and expressed his hatred both for the Spanish and for any Indian tribes allied with them. He explained that he had had a vision that he would not find peace in the afterlife unless he killed 100 Spaniards.

The smell of decaying fish and swarms of mosquitoes drove the Alachua Seminoles to abandon their original town site, and move to a new town, called "Cuscowilla", a couple of miles from the Alachua Savanna. A town named "Lockway" was reported to be on the edge of a savanna (presumably the Alachua Savanna) in 1767. This may have been the original site of the town. (Note: Paynes Prairie, or the Alachua Savanna, as William Bartram called it, is subject to periodic flooding, most famously in the period from 1871 or 1873 until 1891, when it was known as Alachua Lake and steamboats traversed it. Andersen states that the prairie flooded shortly after the Oconee founded the town of Alachua, and that when the lake drained some years later, it left many fish stranded, creating the conditions that led the people of Alachua to move.)

== Relations with British ==
In 1763, when Spain ceded Florida to the British following the Seven Years' War, in exchange for territory west of the Mississippi River, Ahaya was overjoyed. Ahaya traveled to St. Augustine in 1764 to meet with John Stuart, Indian Superintendent of the Southern Department of British North America. The new governor of East Florida, James Grant, convened a conference with towns of the Muscogee Confederation in 1765 at Picolata, near St. Augustine, resulting in the Treaty of Picolata. Representatives of 30 towns in the Muscogee Confederation attended the conference, with Cuscowilla and Apalachee Old Field (Tallahassee) being the only towns in East Florida represented.

The British believed that the Lower Towns of the Muscogee Confederation controlled the land and people of Florida. The Treaty of Picolata ceded 2,000,000 acres (810,000 ha) in Florida to the British. Cowkeeper was not present for the conference at Picolata, and Weoffke signed the treaty for Cuscowilla. Ahaya reportedly missed the conference because of family illness, but he may have been separating himself from the Muscogee Confederation. The British gave medals, two great and four small, to some of the chiefs at the conference, in proportion to their importance.

In late December 1765, Ahaya traveled to St. Augustine with 60 of his people, and stayed there for eight days. Ahaya received a great medal and other gifts and provisions from the British. Governor Grant was impressed with Ahaya's intelligence, and reported that he and Ahaya had "parted on the best terms." In 1767, two British traders were killed when they tried to interfere with Seminoles who were stealing cattle. The British called a conference to deal with the killings. The British wanted to maintain good relations with the Seminoles. Philoke, from Ahaya's town of Cuscowilla, who was the father of two of the Seminoles involved in the killing, was given a great medal by the British.

In the early 1770s, Jonathan Bryan of Georgia hatched a scheme to acquire a large area of land in Florida. Bryan persuaded chiefs of the Lower Towns of the Muscogee Confederation to cede lands in Florida, including the area around the Alachua Savanna, to him. Ahaya was shocked when the bold man traveled as far south as Payne's Prairie to carve his name into a red oak tree, but his allies quickly intervened. Governor James Wright of Georgia informed the Lower Town Muscogee of Bryan's trickery, and Governor Patrick Tonyn of Florida issued an arrest warrant for him. The British felt it necessary to ask Ahaya and other chiefs in Florida if they intended to go to war over the issue. Bryan backed down, saying that he had not purchased a large amount of land, but had merely leased grazing rights to a small area. According to the Indian Superintendent John Stuart, Ahaya was no longer connected with the Muscogee Confederation by 1774.

At the beginning of the American Revolution, the Muscogee towns (the "Upper Creeks") supported the British, while the Hitchiti- and Mikasuki-speaking towns, and other non-Muscogean-speaking groups (the "Lower Creeks") mostly gravitated to the emerging United States and to Spain. One exception was the Alachua Seminoles under Ahaya, by then the largest "Seminole" village in Florida, who remained loyal to the British. Ahaya always responded when called on by Governor Tonyn to help repel rebel invasions from Georgia, which were often led by the same Jonathan Bryan who had tried to grab the Alachua Seminole's land.

In 1783, when the British ceded Florida back to Spain following defeat in the American Revolutionary War, Ahaya asked the British to take him with them. He also told the British that he would kill any Spaniard that entered his territory. After Ahaya's death in 1784, relations between the Seminoles and the Spanish improved.

== Cuscowilla ==
In 1774, the naturalist William Bartram of Philadelphia traveled to Cuscowilla in the company of traders who had established a store there. Ahaya welcomed Bartam, called him Puc Puggee, or "the flower hunter," and gave him free rein to explore his lands. Ahaya's people served Bartram a sweet "thin drink", and a jelly made from the roots of a local Smilax, related to sarsaparilla, and sweetened with honey. The Alachua Seminoles also consumed beef, and some pork and wild game.

Cuscowilla had about thirty wood frame dwelling houses arranged around a town square, with a council house in the middle of the square. Several hundred people lived in the town, with others in outlying villages. Each house had a garden, growing maize, beans and squash. Common fields stretched 2 miles (3.2 km) from the town to the edge of the Alachua Savanna. They gathered coontie and wild potato.

Bartram reported that Ahaya was waited on by Yamasee slaves. The Yamasee slaves at Cuscowilla spoke Spanish and wore Spanish-style crucifixes, indicating that they may have been previously resident at a Spanish mission village. According to Bartram, the Yamasee slaves were fairly well treated.

Preceded by none	Chief of the Alachua Seminoles ?–1783	Succeeded by King Payne

== Sources ==
- Andersen, Lars (2001). Paynes Prairie: A History of the Great Prairie. Sarasota, Florida: Pineapple Press. ISBN 978-1-56164-225-0.
- Boyd, Mark F.; Harris, Joseph W. (1951). "The Seminole War: Its Background and Onset". The Florida Historical Quarterly. 30 (1): 3–115. ISSN 0015-4113. JSTOR 30138833.
- Covington, James W. (1968). "Migration of the Seminoles into Florida, 1700-1820". The Florida Historical Quarterly. 46 (4): 340–357. ISSN 0015-4113. JSTOR 30147280.
- Covington, James W. (1993). The Seminoles of Florida. Gainesville, Florida: University Press of Florida. ISBN 978-0-8130-1196-7.
- Porter, Kenneth W. (1949). "The Founder of the "Seminole Nation" Secoffee or Cowkeeper". The Florida Historical Quarterly. 27 (4): 362–384. ISSN 0015-4113. JSTOR 30138772.
- Wright, J. Leitch Jr. (1986). Creeks and Seminoles: The Destruction and Regeneration of the Muscogulge People (Paperback (1990) ed.). Lincoln, Nebraska: University of Nebraska Press. ISBN 0-8032-9728-9.
