= Ronald G. Sheppard =

American politician (1939–2025)

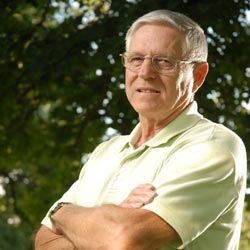
- Sheppard in 2008

Member of the Oklahoma House of Representatives from the 28th district
- In office 1979–1980
- Preceded by: Jeff Johnston
- Succeeded by: Enoch Kelly Haney

Personal details
- Born: August 17, 1939 Wetumka, Oklahoma, U.S.
- Died: July 21, 2025 (aged 85) Midwest City, Oklahoma, U.S.
- Party: Republican
- Spouse(s): Wanda Lee; Lequita
- Education: East Central University, University of Oklahoma, Oklahoma State University
- Occupation: Politician

Ronald G. Sheppard (August 17, 1939 – July 21, 2025) was an American politician who was a member of the 37th Legislature in the Oklahoma House of Representatives, representing District 28 (consisting of mostly Seminole County). He ran against the District 28 Incumbent Ryan Kiesel in 2008 and lost. Sheppard died on July 21, 2025, at the age of 85.

== Sources ==
- http://www.ronforhouse.com
- https://web.archive.org/web/20130622043630/http://okhouse.gov/
