= List of chiefs of the Seminoles =

This is a list of chiefs of the Seminole, which includes military and civic leaders of the Seminole people, who today are enrolled in the Miccosukee Tribe of Indians of Florida, Seminole Nation of Oklahoma, and Seminole Tribe of Florida.

== Leading chiefs (1750–1849) ==
There were four leading chiefs of the Seminole, a Native American tribe that formed in what was then Spanish Florida in the present-day United States. They were leaders between the time the tribe organized in the mid-18th century until Micanopy and many Seminole were removed to Indian Territory in the 1830s following the Second Seminole War.

- Cowkeeper, 1750–1783
- King Payne, 1783–1812
- Bolek, 1812–1819
- Micanopy, 1819–1849

== Miccosukee Tribe of Indians of Florida ==
The Miccosukee Tribe of Indians of Florida were recognized by the state of Florida in 1957, and gained federal recognition in 1962 as the Miccosukee Tribe of Indians of Florida.

- ca. late 18th c.–1819: Kinache, also Kinhagee (ca. 1750–ca. 1819), the last chief of the Creek of Miccosukee, Florida, who was defeated in battle in 1818 by US forces commanded by General Andrew Jackson. Later Kinhagee's people migrated south, maintaining their local village name Miccosukee as the name of the tribe.
- 1962–1985: William Buffalo Tiger, also Buffalo Tiger or Heenehatche, (1920–2015), first chief of the Miccosukee Tribe of Indians of Florida, led initiatives for self-determination
- 1986–2011: Billy Cypress, tribal chairman
- 2011–2015: Colley Billie, tribal chairman, ousted in 2015
- 2015–2016: Roy Cypress Jr., interim tribal chairman
- 2015–2021: Billy Cypress, tribal chairman
- 2021–present: Talbert Cypress, tribal chairman

== Seminole Nation of Oklahoma ==
- 1819–1849: Micanopy (ca. 1780–ca. 1849)
- 1849–: John Jumper (ca. 1820–1896), chief of Confederate faction of Seminole
- 1882–1885: John Jumper, chief
- 1866–1881: John Chupco (ca. 1821–1881), town chief, leader of Union faction of Seminoles, Hvteyievike Band
- 1885–1901: John F. Brown (1842–1919), governor, Tiger clan
- 1905–1919: John F. Brown, governor
- 1922–1935: Alice Brown Davis (1852–1935), chief
- 1935–1936: Chili Fish, chief
- 1936–1946: George Jones, chief
- 1942–1944: Willie Haney, chief
- 1944–1946: Jeffie Brown, principal chief
- 1948–1952: George Harjo (1886–1952), chief, Tvsekayv Haco Band, Bear Clan
- 1952–1954: Marcy Cully, Nokuse (1910–1954), chief
- 1955–1950: Phillip Walker, chief
- 1960–1969: John A. Brown, principal chief
- 1969–1972: Terry Walker, chief
- 1972–1973: Floyd Harjo, chief
- 1973–1977: Edwin Tanyan, chief
- 1977–1978: Richmond Tiger, chief
- 1978–1981: Tom Palmer, chief
- 1979–1985: James Milam, principal chief
- 1985–1989: Edwin Tanyan, chief
- 1989–2001: Jerry Haney, principal chief
- 2003–2005: Kenneth Edwards Chambers, principal chief
- 2005–2009: Enoch Kelly Haney, principal chief
- 2009–2017: Leonard Harjo, principal chief
- 2017–2021: Greg Chilcoat, principal chief, Tusekia Harjo Band and Deer Clan
- 2021–present: Lewis Johnson

== Seminole Tribe of Florida ==
- 1957–1966: Billy Osceola, inaugural holder.
- 1967–1971: Betty Mae Tiger Jumper, first and only chairwoman of the tribe, editor-in-chief of the Seminole Tribune, tribal communications director, and the last matriarch of the Snake clan. Jumper spoke English, Mikasuki, and Muskogee.
- 1971–1979: Howard Tommie, political leader and two-term chairman of Seminole Tribal Council who initiated programs in the 1970s, including accepting the U.S. land claim settlement; successfully negotiated with the State of Florida for water rights for the Seminole reservations, and establishment of tax-free smoke shops and high-stakes bingo as revenue generators. Tommie speaks English, Mikasuki, and Muskogee.
- 1979–2003: Jim Billie, suspended in 2001, officially removed in 2003. Billie chaired during an expansion of Indian gaming and time of increased tribal wealth and economic development.
- 2003–2011: Mitchell Cypress
- 2011–2016: Jim Billie, re-elected and again removed by Seminole Tribal Council in a unanimous vote (4–0) on account of "various issues with policies and procedures of the Chairman's office."
- 2016–present: Marcellus Osceola Jr.
