= Kinache =

Kinache (c. 1750 – c. 1819) was a Seminole chieftain who commanded Seminole forces against the United States during the American Revolution and later during the First Seminole War. He is also known as Kinhega, Kinheja, Kinhija, Opie Mico, Kapitca Mico, Capichee Mico, and Lye Drop Mico (the latter meaning "Far Off Warrior"). He is sometimes confused in archival sources and early histories with Kenhagee, or Billy Perryman.

Kinache was a prominent chieftain among the Seminoles along the mouth of the Apalachicola River during the late eighteenth century when he allied with Great Britain during the American Revolution. Following Great Britain's defeat, Kinache moved to a Miccosukee village on the west side of Lake Miccosukee, where he lived among the Seminole of western Florida. He was regarded as "king of the Miccosukees". During 1800 until 1802, the area was used by Bolek as a base of operations in staging raids into Georgia.

During the War of 1812, Kinache reportedly fought with British forces against General Andrew Jackson at the Battle of New Orleans. Rear Admiral Codrington, in a letter to his wife dated 14 December 1814, describes meeting him. In 1815, Kinache was part of the Seminole/African-American stronghold of Negro Fort, and helped defend it against an attack by Colonel Duncan L. Clinch, when US troops attempted to capture escaped slaves hiding among the Seminole. (See Battle of Negro Fort.)

During the First Seminole War, Kinache commanded Miccosukee forces against the combined forces of American and Creeks under the command of Gen. William McIntosh. Although reportedly killed in battle while leading the Miccosukee in defense of their village, Kinache apparently survived the campaign, later escaping to the Bahamas before returning to Florida in 1819, where he died soon after.
