= Janet Snyder Matthews =

Florida historian

- Born: Janet Snyder

Janet Snyder Matthews is an American historian and author. She is known for her work on historical places in Florida.

== Early life and education ==
Matthews grew up in Ohio. She has a bachelor's degree from Kent State University and a master's degree from Ohio State University. She earned a second master's degree and a Ph.D. from Florida State University.

== Career ==
Matthews worked as the director of Florida's Division of Historical Resources. and was named the head of the state's Bureau of Historical Preservation in 1999. In 2002 she joined the National Park Service's advisory board, and in 2004 she moved to the National Park Service where she was associate director for cultural resources and the keeper of the National Register of Historic Places.

She appeared on C-SPAN in 2005 when she was an official with the National Park Service. In 2009 she returned to the University of Florida, first to teach classes on historic preservation and then to work in the communications regarding historic properties in Florida.

Matthews writes about historically-important places. In 1987, the town of Venice, Florida commissioned her to write what would become Venice, Journey from Horse and Chaise. She also wrote Edge of Wilderness, a Settlement History of Manatee River and Sarasota Bay 1528–1885 (1983), and Sarasota: Journey to Centennial (1985)

== Awards and honors ==
She received the Senator Bob Williams Award, given for exceptional service in historic preservation in Florida, in 2016.

== Personal life ==
She married lawyer A. Lamar Matthews Jr., whom she met while he was in law school and she was working at University of Florida.

== Books ==
- Edge of Wilderness, a Settlement History of Manatee River and Sarasota Bay 1528–1885 (1983)
- Venice, Journey from Horse and Chaise (1985)
- Sarasota: Journey to Centennial (1985)
