= King Payne =

King Payne (died 1812) was probably a nephew of the Seminole high chief Cowkeeper, and succeeded him (in the matrilineal succession) as leading chief of the Seminoles upon his death in 1783. He led his people against the Spanish and Americans from Georgia and established a number of towns and villages, including Paynes Town in Paynes Prairie, both of which are named for him. Paynes Prairie is in present-day Alachua County, Florida, between Gainesville and Micanopy. U.S. Route 441 and Interstate 75 cut through the prairie.

On September 27, 1812, Payne and a group of Seminoles as well as black allies were attacked by a force led by Daniel Newnan during the Patriot War. Payne was shot and succumbed from his wounds days later. He was succeeded as leading chief by his brother Bolek, called Bowlegs by the Anglo-Americans.

== Notes ==
| Preceded by Cowkeeper | Leading chief of the Seminoles; 1783–1812 | Succeeded by Bolek |
