= Econfina River =

River in Florida, United States

Coordinates: 30.0360433°N 83.9282144°W

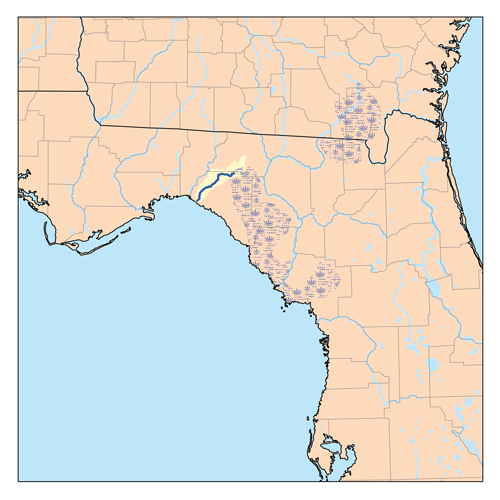

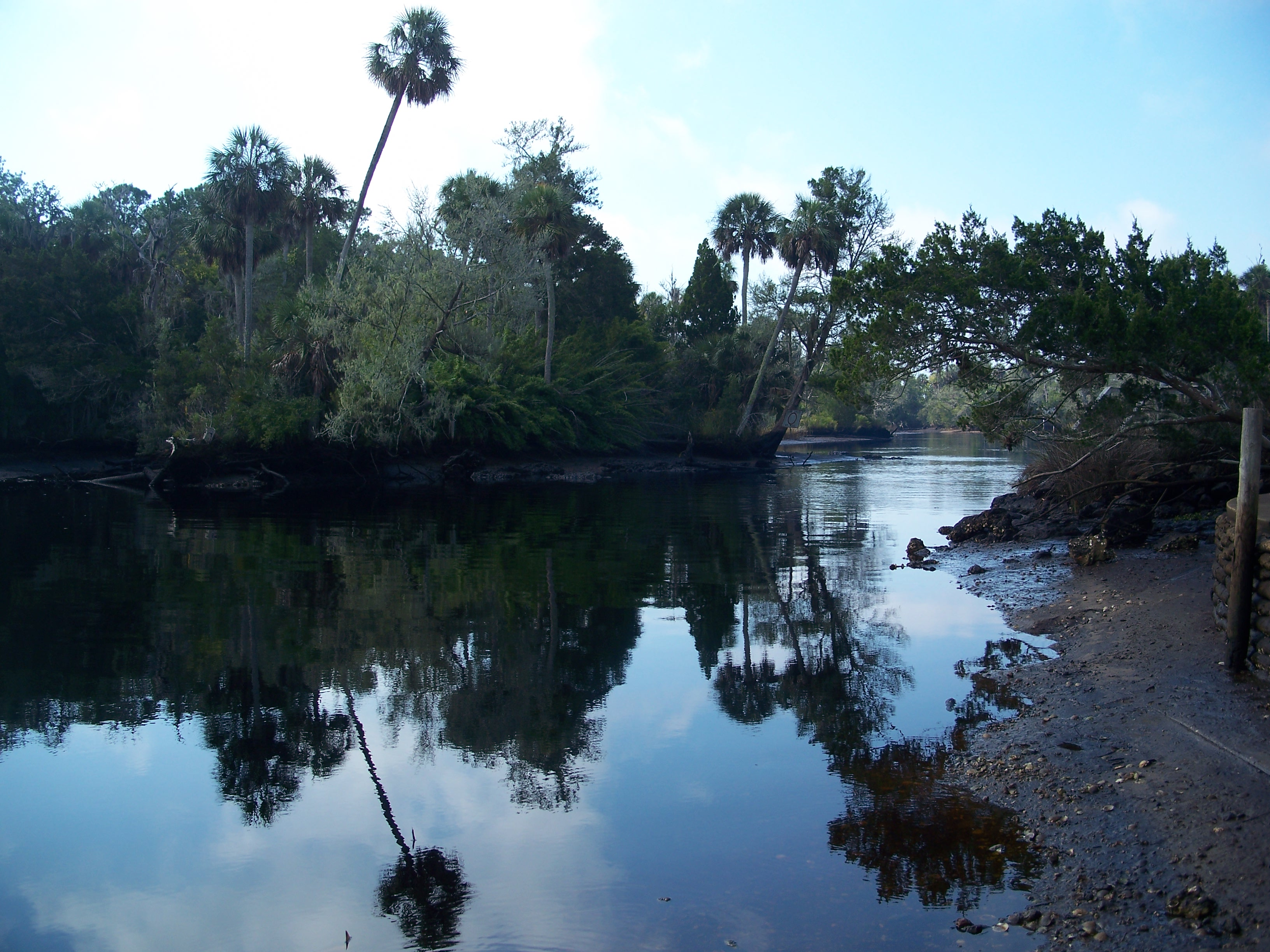

The Econfina River (pronounced Econ-FEEN-uh) is a minor river draining part of the Big Bend region of Florida, U.S.A. into Apalachee Bay. The river rises in San Pedro Bay near the boundary between Madison and Taylor counties, and flows 44 miles (71 km) through Taylor County to Apalachee Bay. It has a watershed of 239 square miles (620 km^{2}).

The name "Econfina" derives from the Creek ekana, which means "earthy", and feno, which means "bridge" or "footlog". This name may refer to a natural bridge over the river in the Natural Well Branch tract. The river is located in the Suwannee River Water Management District. A description of this natural bridge from 1818: "Its name is derived from a ledge of limestone rock which forms over the creek a dry and secure bridge of twenty-five feet width."

In April of 1818, the Econfina River area of Spanish Florida was the site of an military engagement during the First Seminole War between troops under the command of Andrew Jackson and William McIntosh against the Red Stick refugees of the Creek War led by Peter McQueen (see the Battle of Econfina River).
