= Negro Fort =

Fort built by the British in 1814 in Spanish Florida, US

Negro Fort was a short-lived fortification built by the British in 1814, during the War of 1812, in a remote part of what was at the time Spanish Florida. It was intended to support British operations against the U.S. via its southwest border, by means of which they could "free all these Southern Countries [states] from the Yoke of the Americans". Part of its troops did march north against Georgia, but returned when news of the Treaty of Ghent became known.

The fort was destroyed on July 27, 1816 when a "hot cannon ball" landed in the magazine, leading to a huge explosion. This action is also sometimes referred to as the Battle of Negro Fort (also called the Battle of Prospect Bluff or the Battle of African Fort). Colonel Duncan L. Clinch, the attacking commander, reported salvaging approximately "2,500 muskets, 50 carbines, [and] 400 pistols" from the ruins; as well as inflicting nearly 300 casualties to the fort's occupants. The salvaged arms were given to Colonel Clinch's allies, the Creeks, as war booty for their help in taking the fort.

This is the only time in its history in which the United States destroyed a community of escaped slaves in another country. However, the area continued to attract Maroons until the U.S. construction of Fort Gadsden in 1818.

== Construction of the fort ==
Built on a site overlooking the Apalachicola River, about 15 miles north of present-day Apalachicola, Florida, it was the largest structure between the colonial capitals of East and West Florida, St. Augustine and Pensacola. Trading posts of Panton, Leslie and Company and then John Forbes and Company, loyalists hostile to the United States, had existed since the late eighteenth century there and at the San Marcos fort, serving local Native Americans and fugitive slaves. The latter, runaway or freed black slaves from plantations in the American South, used their experience of farming and animal husbandry to set up farms stretching for miles along the river.

Construction at the site of the fort began in May 1814, when George Woodbine, a captain of Royal Marines was landed by Hugh Pigot from HMS Orpheus, and a powder magazine was built. There was a hiatus from the end of August 1814, as the British were requested to redeploy to Pensacola by Governor Manrique.

By September, there was a square moat enclosing a large field several acres in size. There was a 4 feet (1.2 m) wooden stockade the length of the moat, with bastions at its eastern corners. There was a stone building (Note: Several writers have either misinterpreted the cursive writing in original reports or repeated the mistakes of other modern writers... The reference is to "storehouses", not "stone houses.") containing soldiers' barracks and a large warehouse, 48 feet (15 m) by 24 feet (7.3 m). Several hundred feet inland was the magazine, in which stands of arms and 73 kegs of gunpowder were stored.

In November 1814, the British redeployed from Pensacola to Prospect Bluff. Following a council of war held that month with his warrior allies, Nicolls decided to proceed with the construction of two forts, at their urging. (Note: My intention now is to throw up strong works at the Bluff. I have written for cannon and stores...[The Indian chiefs] entreat me to build two forts... If you take us away [on campaign] you ought to have a protection for our wives and children.)

Maroons and Native Americans under British Lt. Col. Edward Nicolls' direction built two forts on the Apalachicola River. The more strategic of the two was on the border of Georgia, at the juncture of the Flint and the Chattahoochee Rivers, in modern Chattahoochee, Florida, from which attacks could be launched into Georgia. Time only permitted the construction of a small wooden structure, which Nicolls called Fort Apalachicola, but is today referred to as Nicolls' Outpost.

The larger one, which actually was built and was intended to be a supply depot for Nicolls' Outpost, did not have a name; it was referred to simply as the British Post. (Note: "It consisted of a riverfront water battery and an octagonal citadel and was surrounded by a bastioned entrenchment. The post was clearly intended for use as a supply depot where arms, ammunition, and other material [for subsequent transit]... to the upper fort.") It was 15 miles (24 km) above the river mouth and 60 miles (97 km) south of Nicolls' Outpost and the border of Georgia. The construction of the larger fort was described by Brigadier General Edmund P. Gaines in a letter of May 14, 1816 to Andrew Jackson, who had charged him with destroying the Fort:

The ramparts and parapets built of hewn timber filled in with earth, mounting 9 to 12 pieces of Cannon, several of which are very large, with some mortars and Howitzers. It has a deep ditch intended to be filled with water, but was dry when seen by my informants, two or three months ago. The work is nearly square and extends over near two acres [0.81 ha] of ground, has Comfortable barracks, and large stone houses inside. It is rendered inaccessible by land, except a narrow pass up near the margin of the river, by reason of an impenetrable swamp in the rear and extending to the river above.

The fort was very well provided with ordnance:

It included 4 twenty-four-pound cannons, 4 six-pound cannons, beside a field piece and a howitzer. In addition there were found 2,500 stands of muskets with accoutrements, 500 carbines and 500 swords ... 300 quarter-casks of rifle powder and 162 barrels of cannon powder, besides other stores and clothing.

The area enclosed by the fort was 7 acres (34,000 sq yd; 2.8 ha); on the eastern corners (those most vulnerable to attack) were bastions with walls 15 feet (4.6 m) high and 18 feet (5.5 m) thick.

The magazine area of the fort was located about 500 feet from the river bank, and consisted of an octagonal blockhouse holding the principal magazine. The citadel was an octagonal design in the Vauban style. Each exterior wall was 50-feet in length. The rampart was 12-feet high and 18-feet thick. It was topped with planking, thus forming a gun deck for artillery. With the addition of crenellations, the height increased to 15 feet

This was surrounded by an extensive star-shaped enclosure covering about 16 acres with bastions on the eastern corners. The ravelin along the river with cannon was 15 feet high and 18 feet thick. To the south of the citadel, where the face of the bluff projected closer to the river than its other points, a redan or ravelin was built. Cannons could fire both upstream and downstream. The heaviest cannons were sited here, and could control the river for over a mile. It appears on the early map, Fort Gadsen was built over it in 1818, as shown on the later map. Cox notes that "barracks, storehouses and other structures were added to the fort, while the primary magazine and armory were inside the octagonal citadel." A further obstacle for attackers is that swamps almost surround Prospect Bluff.

Prior to deploying to New Orleans the following month, where he was wounded, First Lieutenant James Christie of the Royal Artillery was employed by Nicolls "drawing the lines of the fort." This was completed during an absence of Nicolls. Upon his return, and reviewing the plan, "I found it so defective that I ordered [Robert] Henry to execute it differently."

The fort also had "dozens of axes, carts, harnesses, hoes, shovels, and saws," along with many uniforms, belts, and shoes. The British left all these behind. There were over a dozen schooners, barques, and canoes, one 45 feet (14 m) long, along with sails, anchors, and other equipment, and "a number of experienced sailors and shipwrights".

== A refuge for fugitive slaves ==
Fugitive slaves had been seeking refuge in Florida for generations, and they were well received by the Seminoles and treated as free by the Spaniards if they converted to Catholicism; the origins of the future Underground Railroad are here. The Spaniards wanted their own Pensacola slaves back, but as far as American slaves they did not much care. In any event, they lacked the resources to find and "recover" them, at one point inviting the American slaveowners to catch the fugitives themselves. The settlement at the Negro Fort "was the largest concentration of refugees from chattel slavery in the South between the end of the Revolution and the Civil War".

Fugitive slaves continued to arrive, seeking in Florida their freedom; they set up a network of farms along the river to keep them supplied. The Southern plantation owners became increasingly alarmed as news of the fort spread.

To attract recruits, the British visited the Creek, Seminole, and "negro settlements" along the river and its tributaries, distributing guns, uniforms, and other goods. The Creeks were enthusiastic about this opportunity to attack the United States, whose settlers had taken their land. At the request of the British, they started inviting Blacks to join them. Slaves of the Spanish in Pensacola were also invited, and came by the hundreds. As a result, the British Post was a "beehive of activity" in 1814. Colonel Nicolls had under his command, at Prospect Bluff, or living up the river, some 3,500 men eager to attack the Americans. Most of the Africans/Blacks did not want to return to be slaves of the Spanish in Pensacola, some of them adopting English names and claiming to be fugitives from the United States so that they would not be returned.

== British Post ==
After their expulsion from Fort Barrancas at Pensacola, the British returned to Prospect Bluff, on the southern frontier, and intended to establish a post from which to base their operations, by means of which they could "free all these Southern Countries [states] from the Yoke of the Americans".

They were preparing to attack Georgia when news arrived of the end of the war. With the offensive cancelled, a meeting was held on March 10 resulting in the Treaty of Nicolls' Outpost. Nicolls and his men then returned from Nicolls' Outpost to Prospect Bluff. The British paid off the Colonial Marines in April, in the presence of a Spanish army officer, Vicente Sebastián Pintado, seeking to reclaim the fugitives from Spanish Florida. On April 22, the British withdrew most of their force to Bermuda, with Pintado departing with HMS Cydnus, in transit to Pensacola. On May 16, 1815, the British evacuated the last of the garrison there. At the time of his departure in May 1815, Nicolls promised his allies to return in six months, according to Hawkins.

Gaines estimated that 900 Native American warriors and 450 armed blacks inhabited the fort. (Note: Enclosure 7 to Erving. Letter from General Gaines dated May 22, 1815 "P.S. I learn that Nicholls[sic] ..is still at Appalachicola, and that he has 900 Indians and 450 negroes under arms)

== Negro Fort ==
Later American histories would accuse Nicolls of ensuring that "the fort was left intact for the use of the Indians. Instead, it came into the possession of a band of free renegade Negroes." It is the largest and best-known instance before the American Civil War in which armed African escapees from North American slavery resisted European Americans who sought to return them to slavery. (A much smaller example was Fort Mose, near St. Augustine.)

The Negro Fort (African Fort) flew the British Union flag (Union Jack), as the former Colonial Marines considered themselves British subjects. The Spaniards continued their policy of leaving the fugitive slaves alone. What was different now was that a corps had had some military training, and was well armed, and had been encouraged by departing abolitionist Nicolls to get others to run away from their owners and join them. The number and ethnicity of men, and in some cases their families, at the Negro Fort was not fixed; they came and went as the unstable political situation evolved. Yet the existence of a fortified, armed sanctuary for fugitive slaves became widely known in the southern United States.

Negro Fort was ruled under Martial law, and according to the historian Matthew J. Clavin the residents had little in common and struggled with unity.

The pro-slavery press in the United States expressed outrage at the existence of Negro Fort. This concern was published in the Savannah Journal:

It was not to be expected that an establishment so pernicious to the Southern states, holding out to a part of their population temptations to insubordination, would have been suffered to exist after the close of the war [of 1812]. In the course of last winter, several slaves from this neighborhood fled to that fort; others have lately gone from Tennessee and the Mississippi Territory. How long shall this evil, requiring immediate remedy, be permitted to exist?

Escaped slaves at Prospect Bluff came from as far as Virginia (a single individual recaptured by US forces after the battle, Charles, had escaped from Virginia to HMS Seahorse when it was raiding the Chesapeake Bay, and subsequently debarked at Prospect Bluff). The Apalachicola, as was true of other rivers of north Florida, was a base for raiders who attacked Georgia plantations, stealing livestock and helping the enslaved workers escape. Other slaves escaped from the militia units near the border, in which they had been serving. To correct this situation, seen by Southerners as intolerable, in April 1816 the U.S. Army decided to build Fort Scott on the Flint River, a tributary of the Apalachicola. Supplying the fort was challenging because transporting materials overland would have required traveling through unsettled wilderness. The obvious route to supply the Fort was the river. Although technically this was Spanish territory, Spain had neither the resources nor the inclination to defend this remote area. Supplies going to or from the newly-built Fort Scott would have to pass directly in front of the Negro Fort. The boats carrying supplies for the new fort, the Semelante and the General Pike, were escorted by gunboats sent from Pass Christian. The defenders of the fort ambushed sailors gathering fresh water, killing three and capturing one (who was subsequently burned alive); only one escaped.

When the U.S. boats attempted to pass the fort on April 27 they were fired upon. This event provided a casus belli for destroying Negro Fort. Hawkins and other white settlers made contact with Andrew Jackson, seen as the person most capable of doing so. Jackson requested permission to attack, and started preparations. Ten days later, without having received a reply, he ordered Brigadier General Edmund P. Gaines at Fort Scott to destroy Negro Fort "and return the stolen negroes and property to their rightful owners." Jackson framed the attack on a settlement beyond U.S. borders as a law-enforcement action, claiming that it had been "established...for the purpose of Murder rapine and plunder...it ought to be blown up regardless of the ground it stands on."

The U.S. expedition included Creek Indians from Coweta, who were induced to join by the promise that they would get salvage rights to the fort if they helped in its capture. On July 27, 1816, following a series of skirmishes, the U.S. forces and their Creek allies launched an all-out attack under the command of Lieutenant Colonel Duncan Clinch, with support from a naval convoy commanded by Sailing Master Jarius Loomis. Secretary of State John Quincy Adams, who called Negro Fort "a seat of banditti and the receptacle for runaway slaves," later justified the attack and subsequent seizure of Spanish Florida by Andrew Jackson as national "self-defense", a response to Spanish helplessness and British involvement in fomenting the "Indian and Negro War". Adams produced a letter from a Georgia planter complaining about "brigand Negroes" who made "this neighborhood extremely dangerous to a population like ours". Southern leaders worried that the Haitian Revolution or a parcel of Florida land occupied by a few hundred blacks could threaten the institution of slavery. On July 20, Clinch and the Creek allies left Fort Scott to assault Negro Fort (African Fort) but stopped short of firing range, realising that artillery (gunboats) would be needed.

== Battle of Negro Fort (African Fort) ==
Battle of Negro Fort
- Part of the Seminole Wars
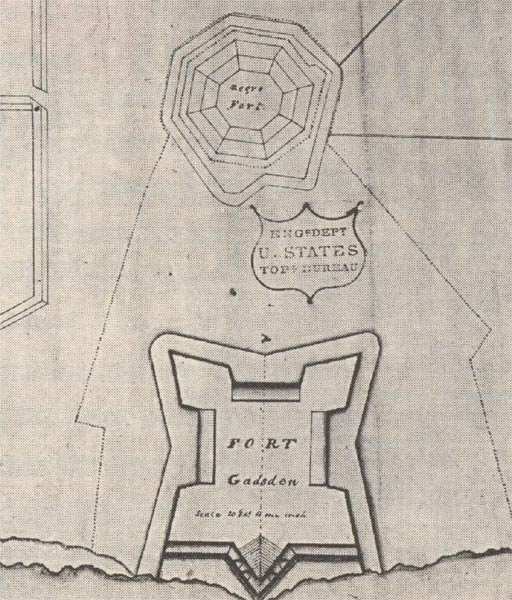
- Map of Fort Gadsden, inside the breastwork that surrounded the original Negro Fort
| Date | July 27, 1816 |
| Location | Negro Fort, Apalachicola Forest, Florida 29°56′18″N 85°00′41″W |
| Result | American-Creek victory |
| Territorial changes | Negro Fort destroyed |

Belligerents
| United States; Creek | Fugitive slaves Choctaw |

Commanders and leaders
| Duncan Clinch | Garçon † |

Strength
| 267; 2 gunboats | 334 |

Casualties and losses
| 3 killed 1 captured | 334 killed, wounded and captured |
- The fugitive slave and Choctaw casualties include women and children.
- Location within Florida

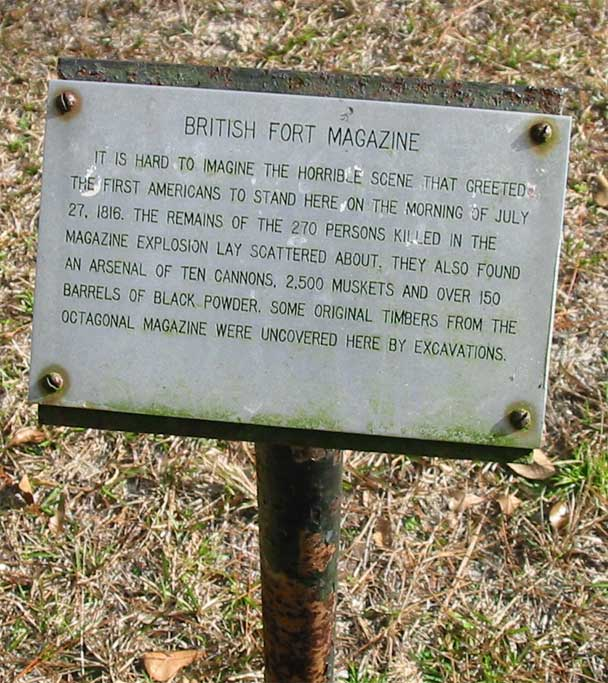
A plaque at the site of Negro Fort marking the location of the powder magazine

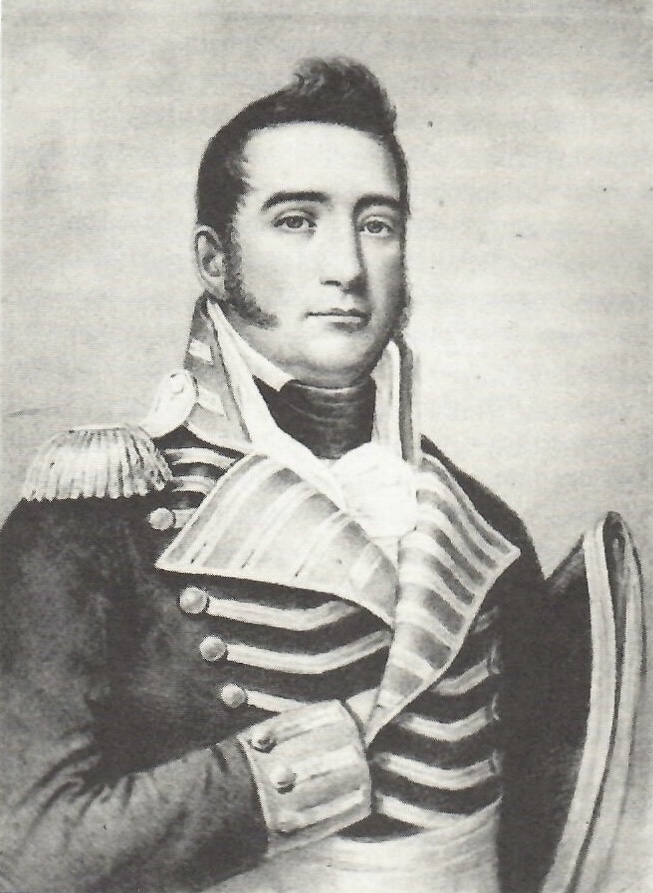
Duncan Clinch, when he was a young officer of the United States

The Battle of Negro Fort (African Fort) was the first major engagement of the Seminole Wars period, and marked the beginning of General Andrew Jackson's conquest of Florida. Three leaders of the fort were former Colonial Marines who had come with Nicolls (since departed) from Pensacola. They were: Garçon ("Servant"), 30, a carpenter and former slave in Spanish Pensacola, valued at 750 pesos; Prince, 26, a master carpenter valued at 1,500 pesos, who had received wages and an officer's commission from the British in Pensacola; and Cyrus, 26, also a carpenter, and literate. Prince may have been the military commander of the same name at the head of 90 free blacks brought from Havana to assist the Spanish defense in St. Augustine during the Patriot War of 1812.

Cox observed that the battle actually commenced on July 20, 1816. As the U.S. expedition drew near the fort on July 27, 1816, black militiamen had already been deployed and began skirmishing with the column before regrouping back at their base. At the same time the gunboats under Master Loomis moved upriver to a position for a siege bombardment. Negro Fort was occupied by about 330 people at the time of the battle. At least 200 were maroons, armed with ten cannons and dozens of muskets. Some were former Colonial Marines. They were accompanied by thirty or so Seminole and Choctaw warriors under a chief. The remaining were women and children, the families of the black militia.

Before beginning an engagement Clinch first requested a surrender. Garçon, the leader of the fort, refused. Garçon told Clinch that he had orders from the British military to hold the post, and at the same time raised the Union Jack and a red flag to symbolize that no quarter would be given.

The Americans considered the Negro Fort to be heavily defended; after they formed positions around one side of the post, the Navy gunboats were ordered to start the bombardment. It was daytime when Master Jarius Loomis ordered his gunners to open fire. After five to nine rounds were fired to check the range, the first round of hot shot cannonball, fired by Navy Gunboat No. 154, entered the Fort's powder magazine. The ensuing explosion was massive, and destroyed the entire Fort. "Almost every source" states that all but about 60 of the 334 occupants of the Fort were instantly killed, and others died of their wounds shortly after, including many women and children. Saunt says the number killed was "probably no more than forty", the remainder having fled before the attack. The explosion was heard more than 100 miles (160 km) away in Pensacola.

Just afterward, the U.S. troops and the Creeks charged and captured the surviving defenders. Only three escaped injury; two of the three, an Indian and a Black person, were executed at Jackson's orders. An eyewitness account from Dr Buck sent to his father on August 4, 1816, republished in 1836, reported that:

The explosion was awful and the scene horrible beyond description. You cannot conceive, nor I describe the horrors of the scene. In an instant lifeless bodies were stretched upon the plain, buried in sand or rubbish, or suspended from the tops of the surrounding pines. Here lay an innocent babe, there a helpless mother; on the one side a sturdy warrior, on the other a bleeding squaw. Piles of bodies, large heaps of sand, broken glass, accoutrements, etc., covered the site of the fort... Our first care, on arriving at the scene of the destruction, was to rescue and relieve the unfortunate beings who survived the explosion.

Garçon, the black commander, and the Choctaw chief, were among the few who survived. African-American survivors were returned to slavery. There were no white casualties from the explosion. The Creek salvaged 2,500 muskets, 50 carbines, 400 pistols, and 500 swords from the ruins of the fort, increasing their power in the region.

The Seminole, who had fought alongside the blacks, were conversely weakened by the loss of their allies. The Creek participation in the attack increased tension between the two tribes. Seminole anger at the U.S. for the fort's destruction contributed to the breakout of the First Seminole War a year later. Spain protested the violation of its soil, but according to historian John K. Mahon, it "lacked the power to do more".

This is the only time in its history in which the United States destroyed a community of escaped slaves in another country. However, the area continued to attract escaped Africans until the U.S. construction of Fort Gadsden in 1818.

== Aftermath ==
The largest number of survivors, including blacks from the surrounding plantations who were not at the Fort, moved east to the Suwannee River valley and rebuilt outside Bowlegs Town. Some took refuge further south in the Tampa Bay area and Angola, while other refugees founded Nicholls Town [sic] in the Bahamas.

Garçon was executed by firing squad because of his responsibility for the earlier killing of the watering party, and the Choctaw Chief was handed over to the Creeks, who scalped him. Some survivors were taken prisoner and placed into slavery under the claim that Georgia slaveowners had owned the ancestors of the prisoners.

Neamathla, a leader of the Seminole at Fowltown, was angered by the death of some of his people at Negro Fort (African Fort) so he issued a warning to General Gaines that if any of his forces crossed the Flint River, they would be attacked and defeated. The threat provoked the general to send 250 men to arrest the chief in November 1817 but the Battle of Fowltown arose and it became an opening engagement of the First Seminole War.

Anger over the destruction of the fort stimulated continued resistance during the First Seminole War.

== See also ==
- Merikins
- Angola, Florida
- Black Seminoles
- Fort Mose Historic State Park
- Fort Scott
- Quilombo
- Runaway slaves in Spanish Florida
- Black refugee (War of 1812)

== Sources ==
- American State Papers: Foreign Relations 1815–1822. Vol. 4. Washington: Gales & Seaton. 1834. OCLC 70183718.
- Boyd, Mark F. (1937). "Events at Prospect Bluff on the Apalachicola River, 1808–1818". Florida Historical Quarterly. 16 (2): 55–96.
- Carlisle, Rodney P. (2012). Forts of Florida : a guidebook. Gainesville. ISBN 978-0-8130-4012-7.
- Clavin, Matthew J. (2019). The Battle of Negro Fort: The Rise and Fall of a Fugitive Slave Community. New York: New York University Press. ISBN 978-1-47-983733-5 – via Project MUSE.
- Covington, James W., ed. (1993). The Seminoles of Florida. Gainesville: University Press of Florida. ISBN 978-0-306-80429-8.
- Cox, Dale (2020). The Fort at Prospect Bluff, The British Post on the Apalachicola and the Battle of Negro Fort. Old Kitchen Media. ISBN 978-0-57-863462-3.
- Cox, Dale (November 15, 2022). Nicolls' outpost : a War of 1812 fort at Chattahoochee, Florida (Hardcover ed.). Old Kitchen Books. ISBN 979-8362183813.
- Forbes, James Grant (1821). Sketches, historical and topographical, of the Floridas : more particularly of East Florida. New York: C.S. Van Winkle – via archive.org.
- Hughes, Christine F.; Brodine, Charles E., eds. (2023). The Naval War of 1812: A Documentary History, Vol. 4. Washington: Naval Historical Center (GPO). ISBN 978-1-943604-36-4.
- Knetsch, Joe (2003). Florida's Seminole Wars 1817–1858. Arcadia. ISBN 978-0-7385-2424-5.
- Mahon, John K. (1967). History of the Second Seminole War 1835–1842 (Revised ed.). University of Florida Press.
- Millett, Nathaniel (Fall 2012). "Slavery and the War of 1812". Tennessee Historical Quarterly. 71 (3): 184–205. JSTOR 42628263.
- Millett, Nathaniel (2013). The Maroons of Prospect Bluff and Their Quest for Freedom in the Atlantic World. University Press of Florida. ISBN 978-0-81-304454-5 – via Florida Scholarship online within Oxford University Press.
- Moser, Harold D.; Hoth, David R.; Hoemann, George H., eds. (1994). The Papers of Andrew Jackson, Vol. IV: 1816-1820. University of Tennessee Press. ISBN 978-0-87049-778-0.
- Nuño, John Paul (Fall 2015). "'República de Bandidos': The Prospect Bluff Fort's Challenge to the Spanish Slave System". Florida Historical Quarterly. 94 (2): 192–221. JSTOR 24769178.
- Owsley, Frank L. Jr. (1981). Struggle for the Gulf Borderlands: The Creek War and the Battle of New Orleans, 1812–1815. Gainesville: University Press of Florida. ISBN 978-0-8173-1062-2.
- Rivers, Larry Eugene (2012). Rebels and Runaways: Slave Resistance in Nineteenth-Century Florida. University of Illinois Press. ISBN 978-0-252-03691-0 – via Project MUSE.
- Saunt, Claudio (1999). A New Order of Things. Property, Power, and the Transformation of the Creek Indians, 1733–1816. Cambridge University Press. ISBN 0521660432.
- Smith, Gene A. (2013). The Slaves' Gamble: Choosing Sides in the War of 1812 (1st ed.). New York. pp. 157, 181. ISBN 9780230342088.
- Sugden, John (January 1982). "The Southern Indians in the War of 1812: The Closing Phase". Florida Historical Quarterly. 60 (3): 300. JSTOR 30146793.
- Taylor, Matthew (2026). Black Redcoats: The Corps of Colonial Marines (second ed.). Barnsley, Yorkshire: Pen and Sword Books. ISBN 978-1-39-903402-9.
- Watson, Samuel J. (2012). Jackson's Sword: The Army Officer Corps on the American Frontier, 1810–1821. Modern War Studies. Lawrence: University Press of Kansas. ISBN 978-0-7006-1884-2. LCCN 2012027879. OCLC 788282695.
