= Micanopy =

Seminole chief

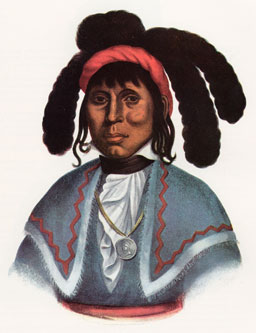
Micanopy by Charles Bird King, 1825 painting

Micanopy (c. 1780 – December 1848 or January 1849), also known as Mick-e-no-páh, Micco-Nuppe, Michenopah, Miccanopa, and Mico-an-opa, and Sint-chakkee ("pond frequenter", as he was known before being selected as chief), was the leading chief of the Seminole during the Second Seminole War.

== Biography ==
His name was derived from the Hitchiti terms miko (chief) and naba (above), consequently meaning something like "high chief" (Creek: Mēkko Onvpv). Micanopy was also known as Hulbutta Hajo, (Creek: Hvlpvtv Haco or "Crazy Alligator").

Little is known of his early life other than that Micanopy was born near present-day St. Augustine, Florida, sometime around 1780. He succeeded Bolek as hereditary principal chief of the Seminole following the latter's death in 1819. The people had a matrilineal kinship system: property and position were passed through the maternal line. Nearly 40 years old when he became chief, Micanopy soon began acquiring large amounts of land and cattle. As was common practice among elite Seminole, he hired more than 100 fugitive slaves to work his estates during the early nineteenth century. He encouraged intermarriage between the Seminole and blacks. This had been the Seminole tradition since they considered blacks to be human equals, unlike the view of whites at the time. Some of their mixed-race descendants gained influence as an elite among tribal councils (including several war chiefs).

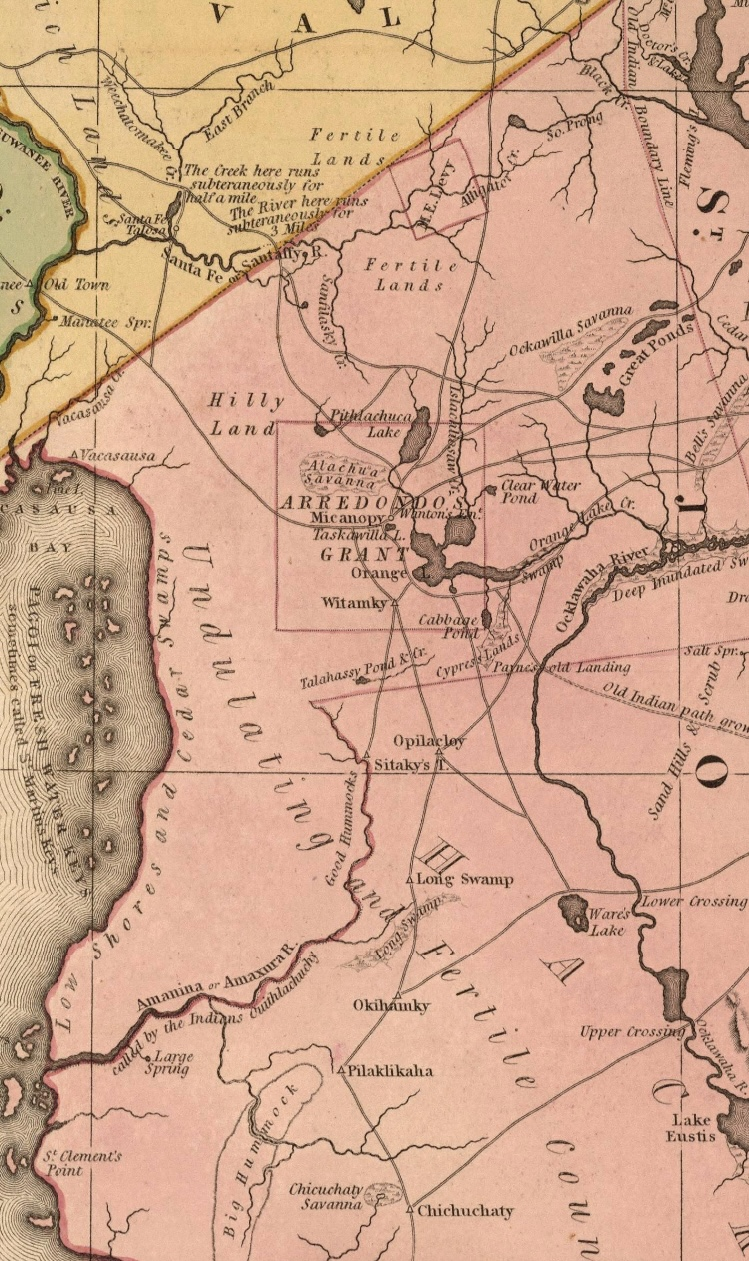
Map of Florida c. 1823 showing Micanopy's town at the Alachua Savanna (David Rumsey 2589.037)

Following the American purchase of Florida from Spain in 1819 through the Adams–Onís Treaty and the subsequent appointment of Andrew Jackson as territorial governor in 1821, large numbers of American settlers began colonizing northern Florida during the next decade. Micanopy opposed further American settlement of the region. As conflicts arose more frequently between the Seminole and settlers, the Seminole were driven away from the Florida coast and into the extensive wetlands of the interior. By the Treaty of Moultrie Creek in 1823, the Americans seized 24 million acres of Seminole land in northern Florida. The Seminoles moved to central and southern territory.

Enslavers from Florida and neighboring states demanded that the Seminole capture and return formerly enslaved people who had taken refuge with them. American development of large cotton plantations in Florida resulted in planters enslaving more people as workers, and some continued to escape the harsh regime. Pressure continued against the tribe, and Americans pressed for removal following the passage of the Indian Removal Act in 1830. A group of Seminole chiefs eventually agreed to the Treaty of Payne's Landing in 1832; on May 9, 1832, they ceded more Seminole lands in exchange for a reservation in the Indian Territory (present-day Oklahoma).

While working to negotiate a peaceful resolution between the Seminole and local authorities, Micanopy refused to sign the treaty. He joined younger chiefs, such as Osceola, Alligator, and Wild Cat (a nephew of his), in opposing the treaty. They began to organize resistance among the Seminole warriors. Following Osceola's murder of US Indian agent General Wiley Thompson, in December 1835, Micanopy (with Osceola) attacked US forces under Major Francis Langhorne Dade and General Duncan Lamont Clinch. Only three soldiers survived what the Americans called Dade's Massacre. Settlers made repeated demands for US military action against the Seminole, and the Second Seminole War began.

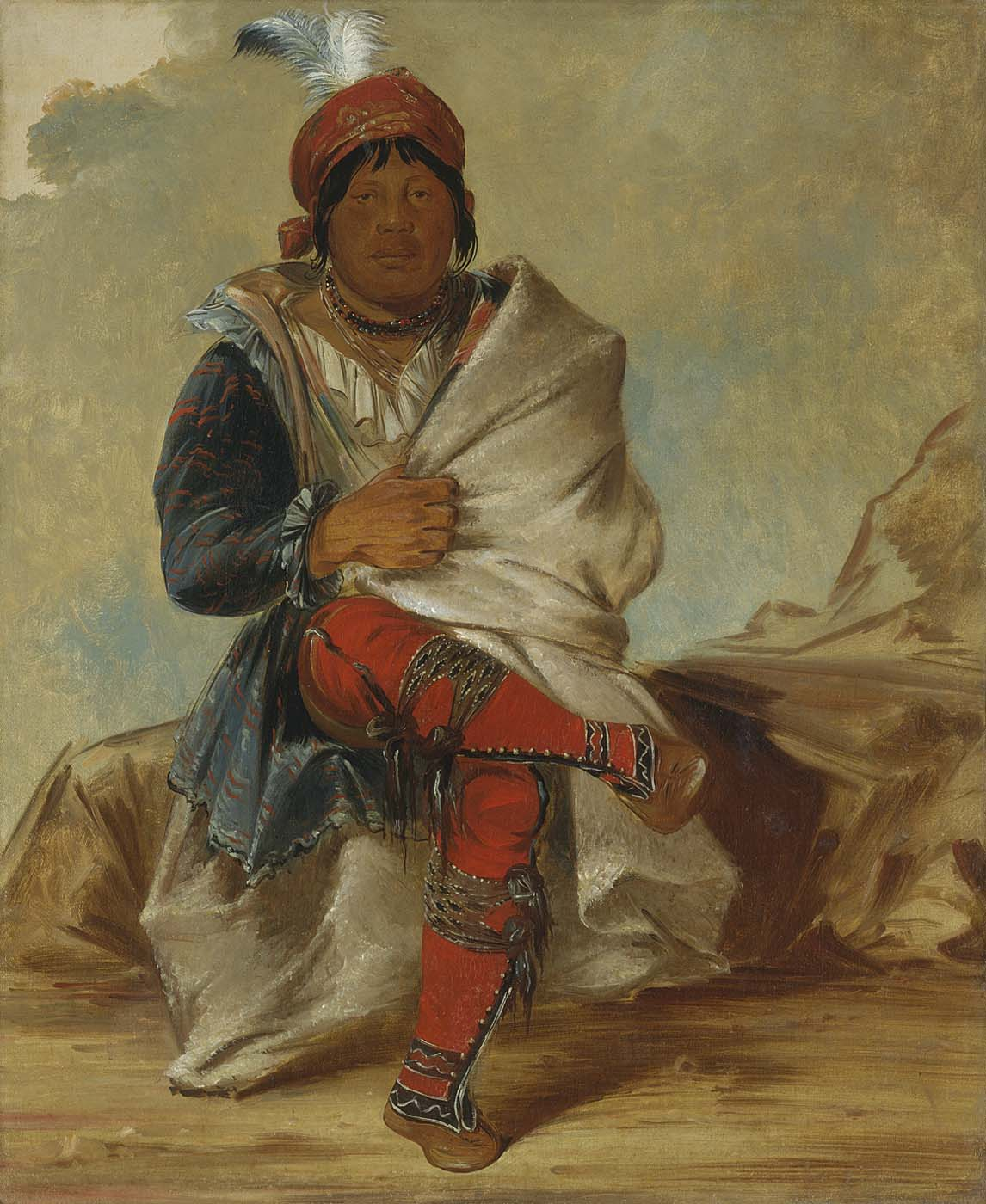
Mick-e-no-pah Chief of the Tribe by George Catlin 1838 painting

The Seminole had early success, but the elderly Micanopy became convinced of the futility of war as he realized the large number of American soldiers who could be sent against the Seminole. He surrendered in June 1837 and began negotiating to move his tribe to the Indian Territory, but Osceola kidnapped him. In December 1838, Micanopy was captured by General Thomas S. Jesup's forces under a flag of truce when he had already agreed to sign a peace treaty. This breach of honor by the United States was outrageous to much of the public, increasing their sympathy toward the Seminole.

Imprisoned at Charlestown, South Carolina, Micanopy was eventually released and sent with around 200 other Seminoles to Indian Territory. Although the people had long been independent, they were initially under Creek Nation authority.

Although Micanopy attempted to reestablish the Seminole as independent, he never regained his previous power. In 1845, he was one of the signatories of a treaty with the US, which gave the Seminole of western Florida semi-independence from the Creek Nation in Indian Territory. The treaty provided for complete Seminole independence in 1855. Micanopy died at Fort Gibson on January 2, 1849.

As the Seminole had a matrilineal kinship system, his sister's son, Jim Jumper, succeeded Micanopy as principal chief. The Seminole gradually reestablished their italwa and traditional organizations in Indian Territory. Jim Jumper was succeeded after his death four years later by his brother, John Jumper, who led the tribe until after the American Civil War. At that time, the United States required tribes that supported the Confederacy to make new treaties, providing for the emancipation of all enslaved people and granting those who wanted to stay with the Seminole equal rights as citizens.

== Legacy and honors ==
European Americans named Micanopy, Florida after the chief. It was founded at the site of the chief's capital town, Cuscowilla.

== Notes ==
Preceded by Bolek	Leading chief of the Seminoles; 1819–1849	Succeeded by ?
