= Peter McQueen =

Muscogee Creek leader (c. 1780 – 1820)

Peter McQueen (c. 1780 – 1820) (Creek, Muscogee) was a chief, prophet, trader and warrior from Talisi (Tallassee, among the Upper Towns in present-day Alabama.) He was one of the young men known as Red Sticks, who became a prophet for expulsion of the European Americans from Creek territory and a revival of traditional practices. The Red Sticks attracted a majority of the population in the Upper Towns in the early nineteenth century. From open conflict with the Lower Towns in the Creek War, the Red Sticks were drawn into conflict with the United States after being attacked by territorial militia.

The Red Sticks were defeated by Colonel Andrew Jackson with state militias, Lower Creek and Cherokee warriors at Horseshoe Bend in 1814. McQueen survived to retreat into Spanish Florida, along with other Creek warriors. There he joined the recently formed Seminole and continued resistance to United States forces during the First Seminole War.

== Early life and education ==
Peter McQueen was the son of a high-status Creek woman and a Scots Highlander fur trader, as was typical of many mixed-race alliances between Native Americans and European Americans in the American Southeast in those years. He was born in the Talisi area (now Tallassee, Alabama). Both cultures considered such marriages or unions as strategic alliances, as the traders brought goods of both practical use and prestige, and offered entry to European society. Marriage to a Creek woman gave the trader entry to the tribe and enhanced his trading prospects.

Because the Creek culture was matrilineal, McQueen derived his social status from his mother's family and clan. He identified as Creek. Traditionally, for a Creek boy, his maternal uncles were more important than his biological father, as the eldest uncle would introduce him to men's ways and the men's societies of his clan and tribe.

== Career ==
Influenced by the thought of the Shawnee prophet Tenskwatawa and his brother, the chief Tecumseh, McQueen was one of several young Creek prophets who envisioned the expulsion of the European Americans from Native American lands. They were angered by the failure of Big Warrior and other assimilated Creek headmen to be more responsive to their people. The traditional lines of communication had been disrupted by Benjamin Hawkins, the US Superintendent of Indian Affairs in the Southeast, who lived among the Creek. McQueen became aligned with the Red Stick faction of the Upper Creek, who were trying to resist assimilation and to restore traditional culture and religion.

Conflicts rose between the Upper Creek towns and the Lower Creek, who had adopted more European-American ways, in part by their locations closer to European Americans, where interaction occurred more frequently. Some of the Lower Creek became wealthy by developing individual plantations, acquiring enslaved African Americans, and operating businesses. Tensions between the factions began developing into violence in the spring of 1813. The Red Sticks began to attack plantations of their enemies, destroying both crops and livestock.

That July, McQueen commanded a party of Red Sticks who went to Pensacola in Spanish Florida to procure arms. On their return to present-day Alabama, they were ambushed by territorial militia and scattered. The Red Sticks regrouped and defeated the militia who were looting their packs, at what became called the Battle of Burnt Corn. European-American settlers on the frontier became alarmed and started spending more time in fortified settlements.

The next month, in August 1813, McQueen took part in the attack on Fort Mims, in the Tensaw, Alabama area. It was a center of plantations owned by mixed-race Creek. The Red Sticks believed such men to have left core Creek values. The assault on the fort became a massacre of most of the militia and refugees within. The Red Sticks killed a total of nearly 500 Lower Creek and European-American settlers.

Together with numerous other Red Stick warriors, McQueen later faced Colonel Andrew Jackson, who commanded state militias from Tennessee, Georgia, and the Mississippi Territory, and allied Lower Creek and Cherokee warriors, at the Battle of Horseshoe Bend in 1814. Jackson's forces won.

Altogether in the Creek War nearly 3,000 Creek died, many of the Upper Towns were destroyed, and the Upper Creek lost much of their stores of food, threatening them with starvation that winter. The prophet's people had slaughtered livestock in the early days of the conflict; later one side and another had destroyed more livestock, as well as stored foods. As they had planted hardly any crops during 1813-1814, they suffered severely from shortages and want.

Attacked by Jackson's forces during the First Seminole War in April 1818 at an engagement fought near the Econfina River, many surviving Red Stick warriors, including McQueen, retreated south into the Florida peninsula (see the Battle of Econfina River). A sister of McQueen has been referenced as a grandmother of Osceola.
