= Patriot War (Florida) =

1812 attempt to annex Florida to the US

- Part of Seminole Wars and War of 1812
Date	1812–1814
Location	Spanish East Florida
Result	Spanish victory

Belligerents
United States (until 1813) (Republic of East Florida) American filibusters, dubbed the Patriots	Spain; Seminole; Black Seminoles (Maroons)

The Patriot War was an attempt in 1812 to foment a rebellion in Spanish East Florida with the intent of annexing the province to the United States. The invasion and the occupation of parts of East Florida had elements of filibustering but was also supported by units of the United States Army, Navy, and Marines and by militia from Georgia and Tennessee. The rebellion was instigated by General George Mathews, who had been commissioned by United States President James Madison to accept any offer from local authorities to deliver any part of the Floridas to the United States and to prevent the reoccupation of the Floridas by Great Britain.

The rebellion was supported by the Patriot Army, which consisted primarily of citizens of Georgia. The Patriot Army, with the aid of U.S. Navy gunboats, was able to occupy Fernandina and parts of northeast Florida, but never gathered enough strength to attack St. Augustine. United States Army troops and Marines were later stationed in Florida in support of the Patriots. The occupation of parts of Florida lasted over a year, but after United States military units were withdrawn and Seminoles entered the conflict, the Patriots dissolved.

== Background ==
=== Before 1803 ===
Conflict between Spain and the United States over the status of East and West Florida arose during the American Revolutionary War. Leaders of the American Revolution hoped that all of British North America, including Canada, the Floridas, and even Bermuda, would become part of the United States. (Note: Spain received that part of Louisiana west of the Mississippi and the Isle of Orleans from France by the Treaty of Fontainebleau in 1762. Spanish Florida, along with that part of French Louisiana east of the Mississippi River (except for the Isle of Orleans) was transferred to Great Britain by the Treaty of Paris in 1763. Britain organized the Florida territory into two colonies, East Florida and West Florida, adding the southern part of Louisiana east of the Mississippi to West Florida.) However, both Floridas in fact ended up as havens for loyalists who fled there during the Revolution. Spain joined its ally France in the war in support of the United States against Britain in 1779, but did not officially recognize the United States or enter into a treaty with it before the end of the war. Spain wanted to recover Florida and all of Luisiana Oriental (the part of French Louisiana between the Appalachian Mountains and the Mississippi River up to the Ohio River) and have exclusive control and use of the Mississippi River. The United States wanted possession of all territory east of the Mississippi River, including the Floridas, and free navigation on the Mississippi. In the event that Spain recovered Florida, the United States wanted access to a free port on the Gulf of Mexico.

The 1783 Treaty of Paris, which ended the American Revolutionary War, returned the Floridas to Spain, awarded the territory between the Appalachian Mountains and the Mississippi River north of the 31st parallel to the United States, and gave the United States navigation rights on the Mississippi. With the transfer of East Florida, most of the British in Florida would end up leaving. Out of those who left, most went to the Bahamas and the West Indies. Spain rejected the last two provisions of the treaty, closing the Mississippi to American navigation in 1784, and claiming boundaries for West Florida that were further east (the Flint River) and further north (the mouth of the Ohio River) than specified in the Treaty of Paris. Further irritants in relations between the United States and Spain included the policies of the Florida and Louisiana colonies in welcoming American settlers, and Spanish support for Indian tribes in the United States. The United States and Spain finally negotiated a treaty in 1795. Pinckney's Treaty settled the boundary between the United States and Louisiana on the Mississippi River, and the northern boundary of West Florida on the 31st parallel between the Chattahoochee River and the Mississippi. Spain also conceded navigation on the Mississippi and the "right of deposit" (storage of goods awaiting export) in New Orleans to the United States as a "privilege" rather than a right.

In 1800 France regained Louisiana from Spain through the Third Treaty of San Ildefonso. The treaty ambiguously described "the Colony or Province of Louisiana with the same extent that it now has in the hands of Spain, and that it had when France possessed it; and such as it should be after the Treaties subsequently entered into between Spain and other states." Prior to 1763 France had claimed all of the coast along the Gulf of Mexico from the Perdido River to the Rio Grande as part of Louisiana, i.e., from Mobile to southern Texas. France clearly specified that it wanted the area between New Orleans and Mobile Bay included in Louisiana when it was returned. France also wanted to acquire East Florida from Spain. Spain ceded control of the Isle of Orleans and of Louisiana west of the Mississippi to France, but continued to administer all of West Florida to the Mississippi River.

=== After the Louisiana Purchase ===
In order to obtain a port on the Gulf of Mexico with secure access for Americans, United States diplomats in Europe were instructed to try to purchase the Isle of Orleans and West Florida from whichever country owned them. When Robert Livingston approached France in 1803 about buying the Isle of Orleans, the French government offered to sell it and all of Louisiana, as well. While the purchase of Louisiana exceeded their instructions, Livingston and James Monroe (who had been sent to help Livingston negotiate the sale) believed that the purchase would include the area east of the Mississippi to the Perdido River, and had references to the appropriate clauses in the Treaty of San Ildefonso included in the purchase treaty. President Thomas Jefferson, after extensive research, concluded that the Louisiana Purchase included West Florida to the Perdido River, and gave the United States a strong claim to Texas.

The American claim that West Florida west of the Perdido River was included in the Louisiana Purchase was rejected by Spain, and American plans to establish a customs house at Mobile Bay in 1804 were dropped in the face of Spanish protests, although the United States government still considered the claims to be valid. It also hoped to acquire all of the Gulf coast east of Louisiana, and plans were made to offer to buy the remainder of West Florida (between the Perdido and Apalachicola Rivers) and all of East Florida. It was soon decided, however, that rather than paying for the colonies, the United States would offer to assume Spanish debts to American citizens in return for Spain ceding the Floridas. (Note: American claims against Spain arose from the use of Spanish ports by French warships and privateers that had attacked American vessels during the Quasi-War of 1798–1800.) The American position was that it was placing a lien on East Florida in lieu of seizing the colony to settle the debts.

In 1808 Napoleon invaded Spain, forced Ferdinand VII, King of Spain, to abdicate, and installed his brother Joseph Bonaparte as King. Resistance to the French invasion coalesced in a national government, the Cortes of Cádiz. This government then entered into an alliance with Great Britain against France. This alliance raised fears in the United States that Britain would establish bases in or occupy Spanish colonies, including the Floridas, gravely compromising the security of the southern frontiers of the United States.

=== West Florida ===
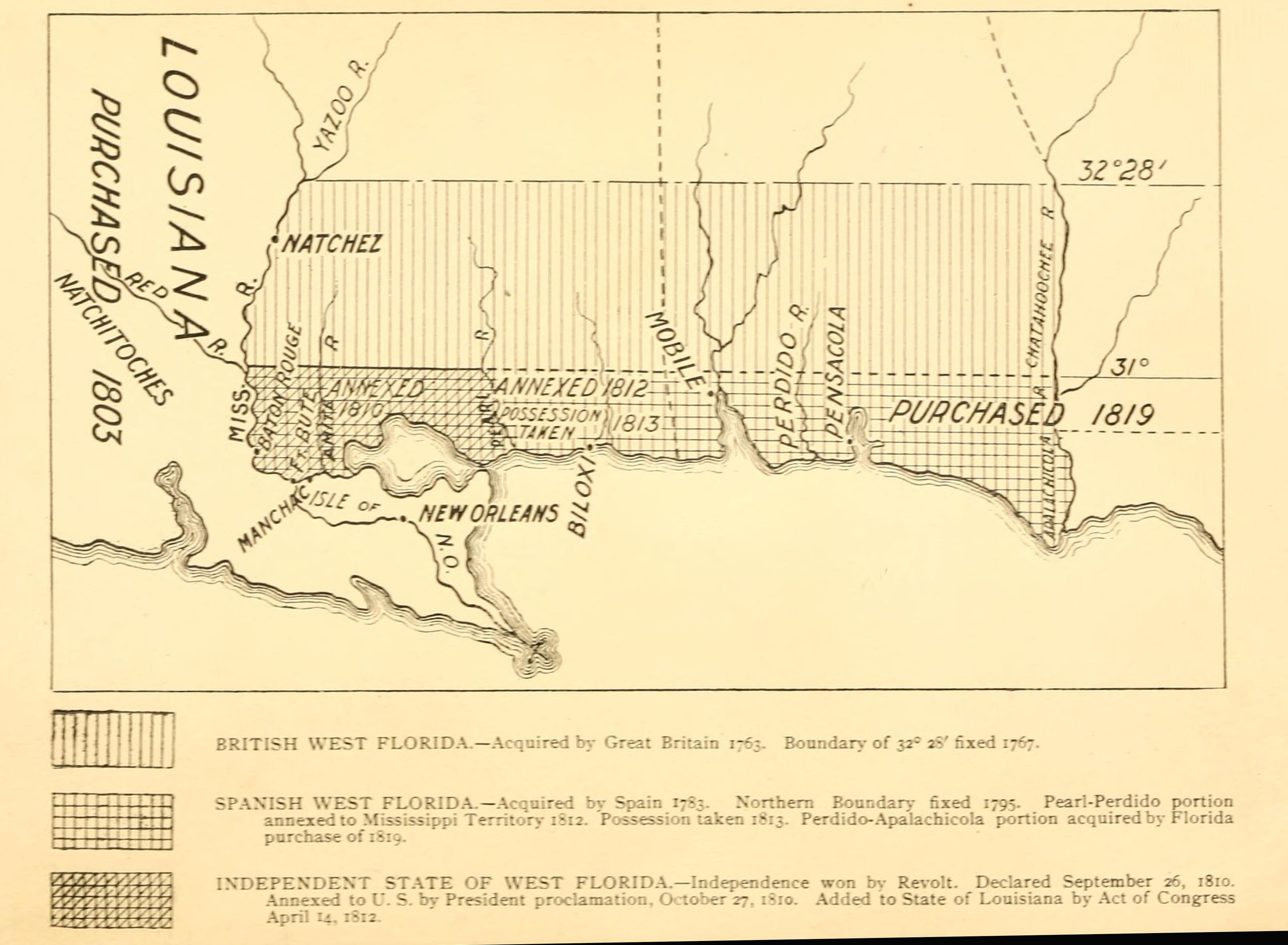
A 1903 map showing the territorial changes of "West Florida"

By 1810, during the Peninsular War, Spain was largely overrun by the French army. Rebellions against the Spanish authorities broke out in many of its American colonies. Residents of westernmost West Florida (between the Mississippi and Pearl Rivers) organized a convention at Baton Rouge in the summer of 1810. The convention was concerned about maintaining public order and preventing control of the district from falling into French hands, and at first tried to establish a government under local control that was nominally loyal to Ferdinand VII. After discovering that the Spanish governor of the district had appealed for military aid to put down an "insurrection", militia seized the Spanish fort in Baton Rouge, and on September 26, the convention declared West Florida to be independent.

The authorities of the newly proclaimed Republic appealed to the United States to annex the area, and to provide financial aid. On October 27, 1810 President James Madison proclaimed that the area had become a part of the United States with the Louisiana Purchase, although the United States had refrained from expelling Spanish authorities pending peaceful arrangements for their withdrawal. At the same time, Governor William C. C. Claiborne of the Territory of Orleans was instructed to occupy the area and administer it as part of the Territory. (Note: The area has since been known as the Florida Parishes.)

Settlers in West Florida and in the adjacent Mississippi Territory started organizing in the summer of 1810 to seize Mobile and Pensacola; the latter was outside the part of West Florida claimed by the United States. United States authorities acted to suppress this filibustering. Juan Vicente Folch y Jaun, governor of West Florida, hoping to avoid fighting, abolished customs duties on American goods at Mobile, and offered to surrender all of West Florida to the United States if he had not received help or instructions from Havana or Veracruz by the end of the year.

== Special agents ==
United States officials feared that France would overrun all of Spain, with the result that Spanish colonies would either fall under French control, or be seized by Great Britain. On June 20, 1810, Secretary of State Robert Smith wrote to Georgia Senator William H. Crawford and asked that he find someone who could travel to East Florida and gather information and spread word that if any settlers were to rebel against the Spanish, they would be welcomed into the United States. Crawford eventually identified and recruited General George Mathews. In January 1811 President Madison requested Congress to pass legislation authorizing the United States to take "temporary possession" of any territory adjacent to the United States east of the Perdido River, i.e., the balance of West Florida and all of East Florida. The United States would be authorized to either accept transfer of territory from "local authorities", or occupy territory to prevent it falling into the hands of a foreign power other than Spain. The resolution also appropriated $100,000 for "expenses as the President shall deem necessary." Congress debated and passed, on January 15, 1811, the requested resolution in closed session, and provided that the resolution could be kept secret until as late as March 1812.

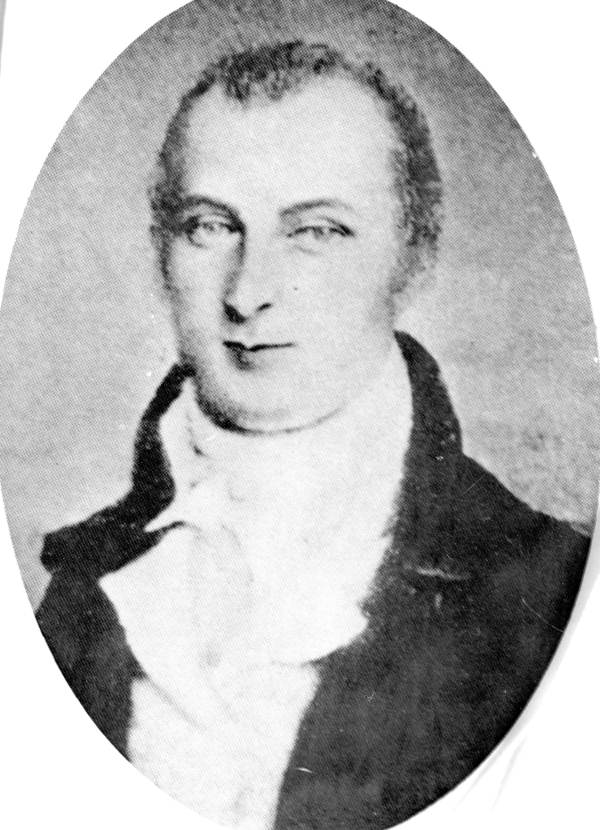
John Houstoun McIntosh

Under the resolution, General Mathews, as well as Colonel John McKee, were given commissions and asked to help fulfill the purpose of the act: to bring Florida into United States control. George Mathews was a veteran of the Revolutionary War and had served as the governor of Georgia. Colonel John McKee had served as a militiaman and as a Federal Indian Agent to the Choctaw. He also served to carry letters between governor Folch and the federal government.

During Mathews' reconnaissance in East Florida, he had tried to judge the willingness of settlers to break away from Spain. In particular, he initiated clandestine meetings with five leading East Florida settlers, men with military and financial influence in the state. These meetings led Mathews to believe that the settlers in East Florida would prefer to join the United States rather than be vassals of the British Crown or Napoleon, if he did in fact depose the Spanish regency. Of those five men, one was John Houston McIntosh, an affluent land owner and eventual leader of the rebel Patriot group. McIntosh, and other Southerners, disliked and very much feared that Spanish Florida was a safe zone for fugitive slaves. He said of Florida: "the whole province will be the refuge of fugitive slaves; and from thence emissaries can, and no doubt will be detached, to bring about a revolt of the black population in the United States." McIntosh believed, like many other U.S. citizens, that Florida should be taken over to deny slaves a southern escape route.

In September of 1811, the British ambassador in Washington, Augustus Foster, wrote a letter to President Madison's cabinet protesting American incursions in East Florida. In particular, he asked for an explanation of Mathews' actions in undermining the Spanish government and wanted to know what the U.S. government was doing to put a stop to those actions. Secretary of State James Monroe responded two months later. In his response, Monroe stated that the U.S. government could not abide East Florida falling into another country's hands. He also ignored Foster's inquiry regarding Mathews.

When the letters between Monroe and Foster were published by a newspaper, Mathews took Monroe's words as an endorsement and began to gather a force of troops for an attack on Spanish Florida. This force would dub itself the Patriots.

== Fomenting the rebellion and the capture of Fernandina ==
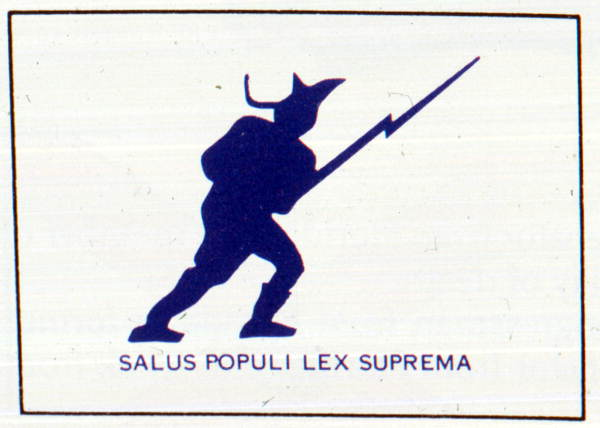
Flag flown by the Patriots as they entered into Spanish Florida.

Even before Mathews managed to band together his group of Patriots, there was evidence of unrest in East Florida. In early January of 1811, a letter from George J. F. Clarke, deputy surveyor general of East Florida and a loyal subject of Spain, described a group of "invaders" from Georgia who had crossed over the border and camped out near Fernandina with the intent to destabilize or otherwise create havoc in the region. It was discovered that they were under the orders of Lt. Col. Thomas Adam Smith, commanding U.S. officer at Point Peter, a military post on the Georgia side of the St. Mary's river about five miles from Amelia Island, Florida. Furthermore, it was openly admitted that they were working with the Patriots and a part of Mathews' plans for Florida. This direct tie between the U.S. military and the Patriots group was an early indication of U.S. designs in the region.

At some point during the summer of 1811, Mathews met with John Houston McIntosh and discussed a plan to set up a temporary local authority in Spanish Florida. This temporary government would then transfer their land to the United States. In this way, the United States could gain parts or the entirety of East Florida while avoiding the appearance that they were directly attacking Spain. To further hide their intent, and because he was having trouble finding many Floridians who actually wanted to rebel, Mathews primarily recruited soldiers north of the St. Mary's river. This ensured that the government in St. Augustine wasn't made aware of the growing threat and then reinforced the town. Many of the men were volunteers from Camden County, Georgia as well as the militia of General John Floyd.

By the beginning of March of 1812, the group had a force of around 125 men. Besides the aforementioned Georgian volunteers, there were also some men from Tennessee and possibly a few Spanish deserters. This group would call themselves the Patriots. To further augment his force, Mathews devised a plan for U.S. troops at the Florida/Georgia border to join the Patriot group. Mathews would then pardon those deserters and restore their military rank following the rebellion. These troops were the garrison at Point Peter and were under the temporary command of Major Jacint Laval, while the garrison's commanding Colonel Smith was away. Laval and Mathews, who at one time lived together, came to dislike one another and Laval refused to supply Mathews with either troops or weapons. It wasn't until March 16 that Colonel Smith returned to Point Peter and agreed to provide Mathews with what he asked for. The next day, a detachment of 50 soldiers joined with the Patriots to march on Fernandina. That same day, March 16, the Patriots elected John Houston McIntosh as their leader. Mathews also sought help from the Navy. He sent a request to Commodore Hugh G. Campbell, commanding officer of the naval forces at St. Mary's, asking for weapons as well as the aid of gunboats. Campbell argued that he was never in agreement with Mathews' mission and stated that his ships were given no orders to open fire. However, 5 gunboats did anchor on the St. Mary's river and trained their guns on the city while the Patriot group captured Fernandina on March 17, 1812.

== Provisional government ==
The Patriots marched into Fernandina, March 17, 1812, removed the Spanish flag, and raised the Patriot flag. A Patriot officer delivered a speech offering the town to US Colonel Smith, who was there for the ceremony. Smith accepted on behalf of the US and promised to protect the city. The speech was reflected in a treaty negotiated between the Spanish and Mathews. The treaty had six articles: the aforementioned promise that the US would govern and "protect" Fernandina, also guarantees that the US would honor existing Spanish land grants, and an offer of employment in the US Army to any Spanish soldiers willing to defect. The treaty also stipulated that the ports of East Florida would remain open to Great Britain until at least May 1813. This was most likely done to mollify local merchants and plantation owners, whose income depended greatly upon trade with Britain. Over the following weeks, the Patriot group marched towards St. Augustine, with Colonel Smith and his contingent of soldiers following behind. At each population center along the way, they repeated what they had done in Fernandina: take the place in the Patriots' name, and then immediately relinquish the land to the US. By late March/early April, Mathews and his band had captured and set up a headquarters at Fort Mose, just outside of St. Augustine

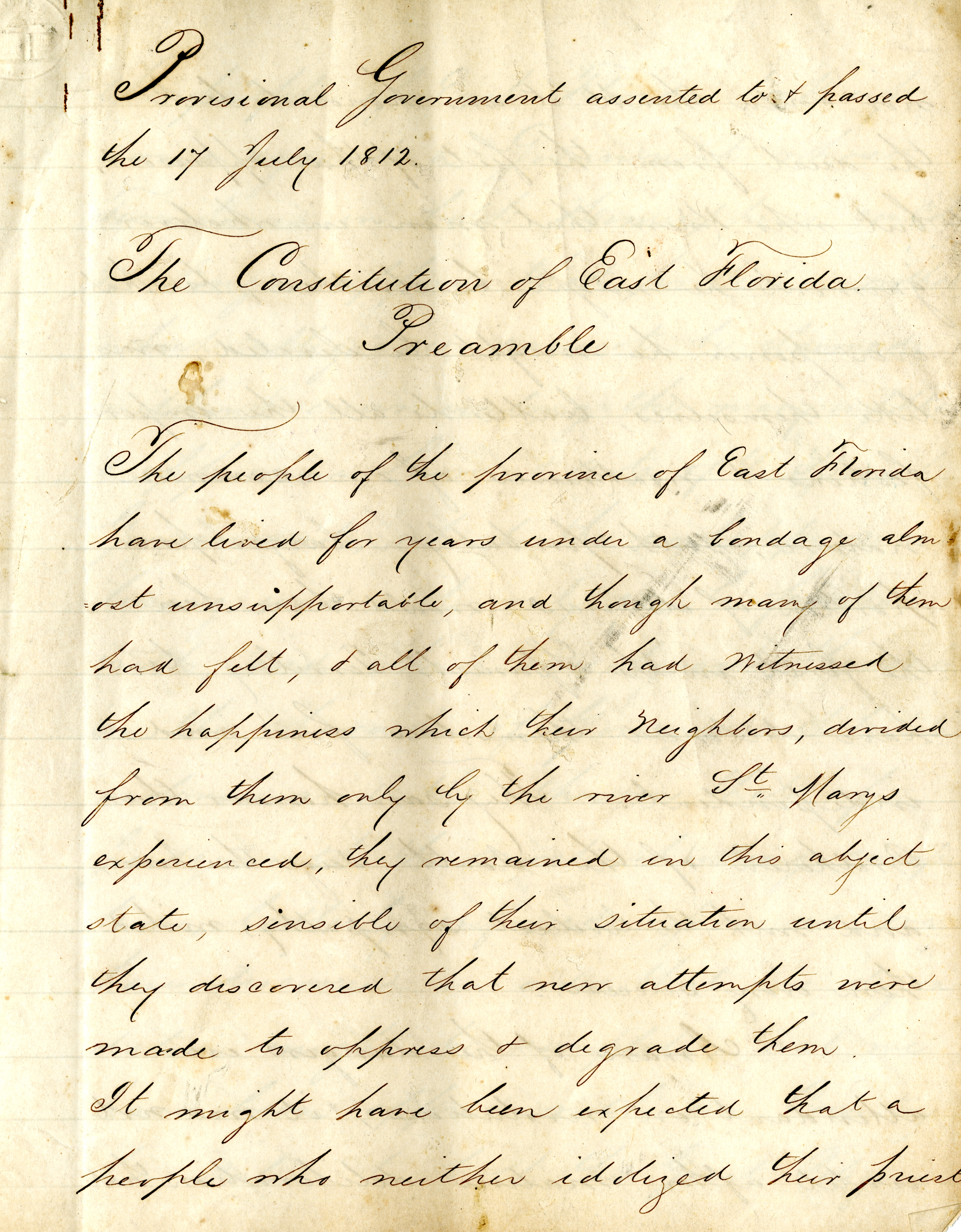
First page of the Constitution of East Florida

By April of 1812, the US government feared entering open warfare with Spain, lest they join their ally, Britain, in the impending War of 1812. In an attempt to relieve tensions between the nations, on April 4 Secretary of State Monroe sent a dispatch to inform Mathews that his actions were "not authorized by the law of the United States." Congress also decided to replace Mathews with David Mitchell, the governor of Georgia. Mitchell, however, made no policy changes.

On July 17, 1812, the provisional government published a constitution signed by 14 members of the Patriot group, with John Houston McIntosh serving as President.

Mathews, deeply hurt by the repudiation from the government, decided to keep quiet about their involvement in the Patriot War until he found that the government intended to keep East Florida. At that point, he embarked for Washington and said he'd "be dam'd if he did not blow them up." He got as far as Augusta, Georgia, and then came down with malaria. He died on August 30, 1812, and was buried at Saint Paul's Church.

In late September 1812, two companies of Georgia militiamen under the command of Colonel Smith were ambushed by a group of Seminoles and their black allies led by King Payne. Another force of militia under Col. Daniel Newnan came to Smith's aid. During the battle, which took place near present-day Gainesville, King Payne was mortally wounded.

By December 1812, the Patriots were accused of "raising the devil", having looted and destroyed homesteads and forcing citizens to flee from their homes.

In January 1814, a group of soldier-settlers erected a two-story blockhouse and dubbed it "Fort Mitchell". While modern historians are unsure of where exactly Fort Mitchell was located, it was likely in Alachua County, near the modern town of Micanopy. General Buckner F. Harris declared Fort Mitchell to be the capital of the Republic of East Florida. After building the fort, the settlers petitioned Congress to annex the "District of Elotchaway [Alachua] in the Republic of East Florida" to the US. They also offered to send soldiers to fight the British as the War of 1812 was occurring.

Aside from the establishment of the fort, Harris also appropriated farm land from nearby Paynes Prairie. The land was coveted by the Patriots for its rich soil. However, the capital was short-lived, as the fort was abandoned by May of 1814 after Harris was killed by Seminoles.

== Aftermath ==
The war was not particularly popular with either politicians or the public. Some of those who had acted as leaders in the rebellion, such as John Houston McIntosh, worked hard to clear their names following the conflict. McIntosh would also sue the U.S. government in an eventually successful bid to make up for the financial loss he incurred the war. Many Seminole as well as African Americans, both enslaved and freed, fled East Florida and settled further south, such as in the Peace River region.

In the summer of 1817, another group of filibusters would cross the border from the United States into Spanish Florida and establish an interim government at Fernandina. This group, made up of some veterans of War of 1812 but mostly otherwise mercenaries and pirates, was led by the Scottish soldier and conman Gregor MacGregor. The temporary government was called the Republic of the Floridas.
