= Fishing ranchos =

Spanish Cuban fishing bases in Florida

Fishing ranchos were fishing stations located along the coast of Southwest Florida used by Spanish Cuban fishermen in the late 18th and early 19th centuries. The Spanish fished the waters along the coast of Florida in the late fall and winter of each year, salting the fish, and then carrying the cured fish to Havana by the beginning of Lent. The Spanish fishermen hired Native Americans who lived along the coast as guides and to help with catching and curing the fish, and with sailing to Havana. The Spanish established fishing stations, called "ranchos", on islands along the coast as bases during the fishing season. The Native American workers lived year-round at the ranchos, or moved to the nearby mainland during the off-season to hunt and raise crops. Many of the Spanish fishermen eventually started living at their ranchos year-round. They married or formed relationships with Native American women, and their children grew up at the ranchos, so that many of the workers were of mixed ancestry, Spanish and Native American. All the residents of the ranchos spoke Spanish. One author has suggested that a Spanish-Native American creole society was forming in the ranchos by the second quarter of the 19th century. The fishermen also carried Native Americans from Florida to Havana and back on a regular basis.

The United States acquired Florida from Spain in 1821. Americans were suspicious of Seminole and Spanish Indian connections with the Spanish, believing that the Spanish were supplying the Native Americans with firearms and powder. Americans also suspected the fishing ranchos of harboring slaves that had escaped from American owners. The 1823 Treaty of Moultrie Creek required all Native Americans in peninsular Florida to move onto a reservation that had boundaries well inland from the coasts. The Native Americans associated with the fishing ranchos, and others who lived in southwest Florida, called Muspas or Spanish Indians, did not move to the reservation. During the Second Seminole War (1835–1842), the United States Army rounded up all of the residents of fishing ranchos, and sent almost all of them west with the Seminoles, including people who claimed to be Spanish.

== Origins and development ==
Spanish fishing vessels from Cuba began fishing along the southwest coast of Florida by the 1680s with permission from the dominant people of that region, the Calusa. After the destruction of the Spanish mission system in northern Florida at the beginning of the 18th century, Yamassees and Muscogees raided far into the Florida peninsula, killing many of the Florida natives, and capturing others for sale as slaves. Most of the surviving Calusas and other Indigenous people evacuated to the Florida Keys between 1704 and 1711. By the 1740s, Cuban fishermen were employing guides and fishermen from the remaining Indigenous people then living in the Florida Keys. Continued raiding by Muscogees and their allies pushed the last Calusas out of Florida to Cuba.

The Cuban fishing fleet consisted of ten or twelve sailing vessels originally based in Regla, across Havana Bay from downtown Havana. The fishing season along the Florida coast was late fall and winter, October or November until February or March. The primary fishing area was the "Coast of Tampa", including the "Port of Tampa" (Tampa Bay) and the "Port of Sanibel" (Charlotte Harbor). Fishing also occurred in the Florida Keys and along the lower Atlantic coast of Florida. Mullet, drum, sea bass, pompano, sea trout, and other fish were preserved by drying or salting. Shark liver oil was collected, and mullet and drum roe was smoked. Vessels would return to Cuba in time for the Lenten season, when fish was in particular demand. In the off-season, the fishing vessels would carry salt from the salt pans at Cay Sal and Punta de Hicacos to Havana. The Spanish government required the fishermen to buy all the salt they used for preserving fish from the government warehouse in Havana, where they paid four times as much for the salt as they had earned carrying the salt from the salt pans to Havana. By late in the 18th century, year-round fishing stations, known as ranchos, were established along the Florida coast between Tampa Bay and Estero Bay, and much of the fishing community eventually resided there year-round. José María Caldez claimed in 1833 that he had lived at his rancho on Useppa Island for 45 years. Caldez also claimed to have visited Useppa Island since before the American Revolution. Spanish records show Caldez as the captain of vessels carrying Indians to Cuba starting in 1805. Some of the heads of fishing ranchos applied for land grants in 1828 based on their occupation of their ranchos since before the transfer of Florida to the US.

Spanish fishing along the Florida coast continued through the British period in Florida, from 1763 until 1783. The British government was concerned that the Spanish fishing operations were a threat to British control of Florida. Governor James Grant was ordered to stop them, but he did not enforce the order. A review of the fishing operations in 1767–1768 concluded that these operations were not a threat to the British. Emissaries from the Lower Towns of the Muscogee Confederacy (which the Spanish called the Province of Coweta, or referred to the Uchise people), traveled by fishing boat to Havana as early as 1766. In 1769 the British withdrew from the old Spanish fort at St. Marks, which was then seized by Tunape, chief of the Tallahassa Taloofa, a Muscogee-speaking town of the Muscogee Confederacy located at San Luis Talimali (in today's Tallahassee). Tunape proposed an arrangement with the Spanish, in which his tribe would hold St. Marks and all of the Florida coast between St. Augustine and Pensacola against the British in exchange for trade with Cuba, including guns and powder. Tunape also told the Spanish that another faction of the Muscogee Confederacy in Florida, the Cimarrones (the Alachua Seminoles, who were primarily Hitchiti-speaking), were allied with the British. The Spanish began supplying arms to the Muscogee Tallahassee in 1779, after Spain entered the American Revolutionary War against Britain. By the last quarter of the 18th century, the Muscogee-speaking towns in northern Florida and down the west coast of Florida, which were affiliated with the Lower Towns of the Muscogee Confederacy, and the Hitchiti-speaking towns of the interior of Florida, commonly called "Seminole", were diverging. Traffic between the west coast of Florida and Cuba grew until hundreds of Indians were visiting Cuba every year, transported in fishing boats from the ranchos. Spanish records include lists of names of Florida Indians that visited Cuba for most years between 1771 and 1823. The names can often be identified as Muscogee in origin. (Note: Seminoles were generally known by their titles (the position they held), rather than a personal name. For example, Osceola is an Anglicized spelling of the Muscogee Asi-yahola, meaning "black drink cryer", one who called eligible adult males to the black drink ceremony. All Seminoles, whether they were Musgokee or Hitchiti/Mikasuki-speaking, were known by Muscogee titles.)

== Rancho Indians ==
Various peoples living in southwest Florida in the early 19th century were called Spanish Indians or Muspas. They lived in palmetto-thatched huts, raised food in mainland farms, traded with Havana, and were in communication with other Seminole bands. While some of the Spanish Indians may have been descended from Calusas, historians have now concluded that, at least in the 19th century, most of those people were descendants of Muscogean people, who elsewhere in Florida became known as Seminoles.

The rancho fishermen hired Spanish Indians to help catch and cure fish for the Havana market. In 1831, by one account, four ranchos in the vicinity of Charlotte Harbor had as many as 300 residents total. Another account gave the population of ranchos between Tampa Bay and Charlotte Harbor in that year as 65 Spanish men, 65 Indian men, 30 Indian women, and 50 to 100 children. Many Spanish Indians were reported to be working at Spanish fishing stations from Jupiter Inlet south on the east coast and from Tampa Bay south on the west coast, and some had intermarried with Spaniards. Other Seminoles also worked at the ranchos during the fishing season and left during the off-season.

William Whitehead, customs inspector in Key West, wrote in 1831 that the women at the fishing ranchos were all Indians, and that the color of their children's skins indicated that many were fathered by the Spaniards. William Bunce, who owned a fishing rancho in Tampa Bay, stated in 1838 that he had 10 Spaniards and 20 Spanish Indians working for him, and that most of the Spanish Indians had been born at the rancho, spoke Spanish, and "had never been in the country ten miles in their lives". He said that they worked for the Cuban fishermen from August until March, cultivated small plots and fished in the off-season, but did not hunt. He also said that many of the Spaniards working for him had Indian wives, and several had children and grand-children. Baptismal records from between 1807 and 1827 at a church in Regla include 20 children born to Spanish fathers and their Indian wives, 5 born to Indian women with no recorded father, and 3 with Indian parents.

An 1838 petition by Spanish fishermen and sailors claimed that Indian and part-Indian wives and children had been "unjustly" removed from the ranchos, that they were an entirely separate group that had intermarried with Spaniards for decades, and were not part of the Seminole nation. John Worth has stated that the Spanish Indians of the ranchos were neither Seminole nor Calusas, but a creole community that emerged in the 18th and early 19th centuries, consisting of Spanish Cuban fishermen and people predominantly descended from Muskogean-speaking people who were present in southwest Florida decades before the Seminoles.

There is also some evidence of an African presence at the ranchos. There are records of baptisms of two children of enslaved Africans owned by Caldez, and the baptism and manumission of the son of a free part-black and a part-black slave of Caldez, the latter described as a native of Useppa Island.

== American possession ==
The United States took possession of Florida from Spain in 1821. Americans suspected the fishing ranchos in Florida of harboring escaped slaves. A large Maroon settlement on Tampa Bay known as "Angola" was attacked in 1821 by 200 Muscogee warriors sent by Andrew Jackson and led by William McIntosh. The Muscogee captured several hundred escaped slaves and destroyed the settlement. The Muscogees then proceeded down the coast as far as Punta Rassa, searching for more escaped slaves. They did not find any at the fishing ranchos, but sacked them anyway. Indians in south Florida were also believed to be buying guns and powder from Spanish fishermen. William Grafton Delaney Worthington, secretary and acting governor of the Territory of East Florida, reported to the US secretary of state that the Spaniards were suspected of maintaining close ties to the Seminoles. In 1825, Seminole Indians at Charlotte Harbor were reported to be either leaving for or returning from Havana, and trading with the Cubans.

In the early 1830s there were four known fishing ranchos in southwest Florida, likely at Bokeelia at the northern end of Pine Island, Caldez Island (now Useppa Island), Punta Rassa, and at the mouth of the Caloosahatchee River. William Bunce, originally from Maryland, began operating a fifth fishing rancho at the mouth of the Manatee River on Tampa Bay sometime in the early 1830s.

=== Smuggling ===
Colonel George Mercer Brooke was ordered to stop illegal logging in the Tampa Bay and Charlotte Harbor areas in 1822. He established Fort Brooke, but was unable to stop the logging. After Fort Brooke was established, the rancho fishermen sold Cuban cigars, fresh fruit, and an occasional sea turtle to the soldiers at the fort. Brooke requested that the US Navy patrol the coast where the fishing ranchos were located. American fishing boats from Connecticut were fishing in Florida waters and selling their catch in Cuba. The Americans sold fresh fish, while the ranchos sold salted and dried fish, so that there was no direct competition, but the American fishermen wanted Congress to tax foreign fishing boats. During the 1820s, there was growing concern about the Spanish fishermen smuggling and engaging in commerce with Indians. In 1824, Gad Humphreys, the Indian agent for southwest Florida, reported that many Indians were travelling to Cuba, where they were welcomed and provided gifts, and that alcoholic beverages were being supplied to the Indians through the fishing ranchos. He also reported that runaway slaves were being taken to Cuba by the Spanish fishermen. Acting Florida governor George Walton, Jr. regarded Humphrey's claims as exaggerated. Colonel Brooke proposed sending Army patrols to stop the traffic in alcohol, but there is no record of any action taken.

Rumors that smuggling was common around Tampa Bay and Charlotte Harbor reached customs officials by the end of the 1820s. One report claimed that the Spanish fishermen were engaged in smuggling much more than in fishing. Jesse Willis, customs collector at St. Marks, visited the area in 1830 and found between 400 and 600 Spaniards and Indians living at the ranchos. Although told that all cargos from Cuba to the ranchos were passing through customs control at Key West, Willis believed that the fishermen had paid duties on less than half of the supplies reaching Florida, and recommended that a customs inspector be stationed at Charlotte Harbor. Deputy customs collectors were appointed in 1830; Augustus Steele for Tampa Bay, and George Willis for Charlotte Harbor.

William Whitehead said that the Cuban fishermen paid import duties and tonnage fees at the port of entry in Key West and that some of them had considered becoming American citizens, but held back because they did not speak English. He also noted that article 15 of the Adams-Onís Treaty gave equal protection to Spanish and American vessels for 12 years.

=== Hostility to the ranchos ===
Americans in Florida were anxious that the Spanish and Indians in southwest Florida be removed in order that clear title to the land would be available for settlers. In 1832, the Legislative Council of the Territory of Florida passed a law requiring licensing of all fishing vessels in Florida, with licensing fees and bonds for foreign vessels set so high that William Whitehead felt they were intended to drive the Spanish fishermen out of Florida. George Willis, already customs collector for Charlotte Harbor, was appointed as protector of the Charlotte Harbor fisheries. Willis, unhappy with the low pay for a hardship position, resigned, and Henry Crews was appointed as customs collector for Charlotte Harbor in 1833. Whitehead sought to dismiss Crews in 1835 after Crews refused to allow Jose Caldez to unload a cargo at Useppa that Whitehead had cleared in Key West. Crews contended that the cargo in question included liquor meant for the Indians. Crews was killed by Seminoles in April 1836, four months after the Dade battle marked the beginning of the Second Seminole War, and just before his replacement arrived in Charlotte Harbor.

In 1833, John Winslett, a white attorney working for the Muscogee nation, was in Florida tracking slaves who had escaped from Muscogee owners. He stated in an affidavit that he had been advised that it was unsafe to travel south of Tampa Bay in pursuit of runaway slaves because there were bands of "desperadoes, runaways, murderers, and thieves" between there and Charlotte Harbor, composed of Indians and Blacks, most of the latter being runaway slaves. Wiley Thompson, the Indian agent at Fort King, wrote to Florida governor William Pope Duval at the beginning of 1834 about a settlement of "negroes, Indians, and Spaniards" southeast of Charlotte Harbor, "a lawless, motley crew". Thompson wrote again in 1835 of unauthorized settlements of Blacks, Indians, and Spaniards in peninsular Florida, and stated that the Indians were descended from Seminoles. He also stated that there were "roving bands of Seminole Indians on and about the Everglades".

By 1835, American officials had become concerned about the number of Indians living at or near the fishing ranchos instead of on the reservation that was established by the Treaty of Moultrie Creek. The military put pressure on William Bunce, who had a fishing rancho on Tampa Bay, to send away the Indians at his rancho. Augustus Steele wrote to Wiley Thompson in 1835 concerning the legal status of the Indians attached to fishing ranchos. Steele declared that while the Indians and mixed race persons at the ranchos were descended from Seminoles, they did not claim affiliation with the Seminoles, and were not claimed by the Seminoles because the Seminoles did not want to share the annuities paid to them by the American government. He also stated that the Indians at the ranchos spoke Spanish, and that some had been baptised in Havana, and described them as "Spanish fishermen under the Spanish government", and "incapable of supporting themselves by ordinary Indian means". Thompson replied to Steele, stating that the Spanish Indians were bound by communication and family relationships to the Seminoles, and had to join the Seminoles on the reservation. However, it was agreed that the Indians working for Bunce could remain at his rancho.

An 1837 report stated that Indians living on the coast south of Charlotte Harbor had never gone to the reservation agency, but traded produce, skins, and small live animals at the Spanish ranchos for guns, ammunition, and clothing. They may have also sometimes worked at the ranchos. They had not been represented at the Moultrie Creek and Payne's Landing treaty conferences with the US, and had never agreed to leave Florida.

== Second Seminole War ==
The start of the Second Seminole War at the end of 1835 brought trouble to southwest Florida. Rumors spread that Seminoles were planning to attack establishments around Tampa Bay. The Navy and the Louisiana Volunteer Regiment were ordered to search for Seminoles south of Tampa Bay, without success. Spaniards from the fishing ranchos served as guides for the expedition. In April, Henry Crews was murdered at Charlotte Harbor, and a party of 25 Seminoles led by Wyhokee raided the Useppa Island fishing rancho. Approximately 200 residents of fishing ranchos in the Charlotte Harbor area then fled to William Bunce's rancho on Tampa Bay. Later that year, the "old" ranchos in the vicinity of Sanibel Island were reported to be deserted and mostly destroyed. Other Spanish Indians still remained on the mainland. An 1837 Army excursion from the Caloosahatchee River to Cape Sable captured 243 prisoners.

In 1837, a US Navy party burned part of William Bunce's rancho on the Manatee River. Bunce then moved most of his operations to Passage Key, at the entrance to Tampa Bay. However, the Army seized all persons with any Indian ancestry that they found at the ranchos. General Thomas Jesup, Army commander in Florida, stated that if he let any Spanish Indians stay in Florida, other Seminoles would refuse to go to Indian Territory. In 1838, the Spanish Indian wives and children at Bunce's rancho, and even some of the Spaniards, were force to emigrate to Indian Territory with the Seminoles. That year, 21 men who had been rounded up from Charlotte Harbor ranchos to be shipped to Indian Territory petitioned to be released on the grounds that they were Spanish, not Indians. Two of the men complained that their wives had been claimed by Holata Emathla as part of his band being sent to Indian Territory. In 1838, 80 Spaniards were reported to be among captives being sent to the Indian Territory from Florida. Seven Spaniards were allowed to stay in New Orleans when they promised not to return to Florida. A newspaper in Arkansas reported that one group of captives being taken to the Indian Territory included 150 Spanish Indians and Spaniards who had married Seminoles. Bunce was accused of trafficking with the Seminoles in 1840, and the Army destroyed his rancho.

Thomas Lawson, then Surgeon General of the United States Army, led an expedition along the southwest coast of Florida in 1838, looking for Indian settlements. He found cleared fields and abandoned village sites, but no Indians. He reported that, aside from islands along the coast, the inland country was uninhabitable. He reached Cape Sable, where he established Fort Poinsett. The remaining Spanish Indians in Florida, under Chakaika, entered the war against the United States in 1839. Chakaika had apparently been a member of a fishing rancho community. John Worth reports that Chakaika had been baptized as Antonio, and that his entry into the war was a response to the destruction of the Spanish rancho system by the US Army in 1836–1839. The United States Army found Chakaika's settlement in the Everglades in 1840, and Chakaika and several of his men were killed. Some surviving men from Chakaika's band may have joined other Seminole bands. Twenty-four surviving women and children from Chakaika's band had been sent to Indian Territory by 1841.

== Legacy ==
A fishing rancho owned by a Cuban is reputed to have operated in southern Pinellas County from 1843 until 1848, when it was destroyed in the 1848 Tampa Bay hurricane. Antonio Máximo Hernández is reported to have supplied fish to Havana, to have worked as a fishing and turtle egg guide for soldiers at Fort Brooke, and to have aided the US Army during the Second Seminole War. It is also reported that he received a land grant in 1842.

Spanish Indians disappeared from the historical record after 1840. Some Seminole families in Oklahoma claimed Spanish ancestry in 1932, but it is unclear whether they derived from Chakaika's band or from rancho Indians.

Fishing stations on the southwest coast of Florida were still called "ranches" or "ranchos" in the mid-20th century.

== Sources ==
- Adams, George R. (April 1970). "The Caloosahatchee Massacre: Its Significance in the Second Seminole War". The Florida Historical Quarterly. 48 (4): 368–380.
- Buker, George E. (January 1979). "The Mosquito Fleet's Guides and the Second Seminole War". The Florida Historical Quarterly. 57 (3): 311–326.
- Covington, James (1959). "Trade Relations Between Southwestern Florida and Cuba, 1600-1840". Florida Historical Quarterly. 38 (2). Florida Historical Society: 119 – via STARS.
- Hammond, E. A. (1972). "The Spanish Fisheries of Charlotte Harbor". Florida Historical Quarterly. 51 (4): 355–380.
- Hill, James L. (2014). ""Bring them what they lack": Spanish-Creek Exchange and Alliance Making in a Maritime Borderland, 1763–1783". Early American Studies. 12 (1): 36–67. ISSN 1543-4273. JSTOR 24474846.
- Miller, Betty Jean (October 18, 2005). "Early settler left his mark in "Maximo"". Tampa Bay Times.
- Neill, Wilfred T. (June 1955). "The Identity of Florida's "Spanish Indians"". The Florida Anthropologist. 8 (2): 43–58 – via University of Florida Digital Collection.
- Sturtevant, William C. (1953). "Chakaika and the "Spanish Indians"" (PDF). Tequesta. 13: 35–73. Archived from the original (PDF) on 2012-02-08 – via Digital Collections Florida International University.
- Tebeau, Charlton W. (1968) [1964]. Man in the Everglades (Second, revised ed.). Coral Gables, Florida: University of Miami Press. LCCN 68-17768.
- Worth, John E. (2012). "Creolization in Southwest Florida: Cuban Fishermen and "Spanish Indians," ca. 1766—1841". Historical Archaeology. 46 (1): 142–160. doi:10.1007/BF03376865. JSTOR 23264529.
