= Spanish Indians =

Ethnic group in 19th century Florida

Spanish Indians was the name Americans sometimes gave to Native Americans living in southwest Florida and in southernmost Florida during the first half of the 19th century. Those people were also sometimes called "Muspas". Seminoles, Muscogees (called "Creeks" by English-speakers), Alabamas, and Choctaws were also reported to be living in southwest and southern Florida in the early 19th century. Many Native Americans were employed by and often resident at Spanish-Cuban fishing ranchos along the coast of southwest Florida. During the Second Seminole War, a band led by Chakaika that lived in the Shark River Slough in the Everglades was particularly called "Spanish Indians". The residents of the fishing ranchos and, after Chakaika's death in 1840, many people from his band, were sent west to the Indian Territory, and Spanish Indians were no longer mentioned in the historical record. Scholars long regarded the Spanish Indians as likely a surviving remnant of the Calusa people. More recent scholarship regards the Spanish Indians as Muskogean language-speakers (collectively called "Muscogulges") who had settled in southern Florida in the 18th century and formed a close association with Spaniards, or were even beginning to form a Spanish-Native American creole people.

== Origins ==
There were a number of different Native American peoples living in southwestern Florida in the late 18th century and early 19th centuries. It was reported in 1823 that there were Seminoles, as well as small numbers of Muscogees, Alabamas, Choctaws, and other tribes, living near Tampa Bay and Charlotte Habor, with some living in the Cape Sable region, and "not more than 50" on the east coast near Cape Florida. People living in the area of Charlotte Harbor were called both "Spanish Indians" and "Muspas", (Note: Muspa was a town and sub-chiefdom in the Calusa domain, located in the vicinity of southern Marco Island or the Ten Thousand Islands in the 17th century.) and it was long assumed later in the 19th century and the first half of the 20th century that the Spanish Indians and Muspas were remnants of the Calusa. The Spanish Indians lived in palmetto thatched huts, raised food in mainland farms, spoke Spanish, dealt with Spanish-Cuban fishermen, visited and traded with Havana, and were in communication with other Indian bands in Florida, but had no contact with English-speakers.

=== Calusas ===
When the Spanish first reached Florida, southwest Florida was the home of the Calusa and other peoples who were closely associated with and dominated by them. Spanish presence in the Calusa domain was sporadic and limited, with the last Spanish attempt to place a mission with the Calusa failing in 1697. After the destruction of the Spanish mission system in northern Florida at the beginning of the 18th century, Yamassees and Muscogulges raided far into the Florida peninsula, killing many of the Florida natives, and capturing others for sale as slaves.

Continued raiding by Muscogulges pushed the last Calusas and other peoples into extreme southern Florida. The last 60 Calusas on Key West were evacuated to Cuba in 1760. Bernard Romans reported that the coast between Cape Sable and Cape Romano was the last refuge of the Calusa before they were driven off the continent by the Muscogulges, and that the last 80 families of Calusa left Florida for Havana in 1763, when Florida was ceded to the British by the Spanish.

There are some reports of possible remnants of Calusas remaining in Florida. William Bartram reported that in 1774 an old Muscogee told him about a town called "Calusahatche" on the "Bay of Carlos" (Charlotte Habor), occupied by Calosulges (Calusa people) which included ancient residents of Florida called "Painted people" and "Bat necks". However, Benjamin Hawkins mentioned the town of Caloosahatchee as being Seminole in 1778-1779. (Note: The element -hatchee is Muskogean for "river") Botanist John C. Gifford found a village on the Shark River in 1904 that he thought was not typically Seminole, but perhaps a mixture of Calusa and Seminole.

=== Muscogulges ===
Muskogean-speakers began settling in the Florida Peninsula by the middle of the 18th century. A band of Hitchiti-speaking Oconees, (Note: The Hitchiti and Mikasuki languages are closely related, but scholars do not agree on how they are related. People speaking Hitchiti in the 18th century were replaced by or gave rise to people speaking Mikasuki in the later 19th and 20th centuries.) led by Ahaya, settled on the Alachua Savanna (now called Paynes Prairie) sometime around 1750. They later became known as the "Alachua Seminoles".

People speaking Muskogean languages may have settled in southern Florida before all of the Calusa left. (Note: The Seminoles of Florida speak two Muskogean languages, Cow Creek Seminole (Muscogee) and Mikasuki.) In the 1950s, Miccosukees living west of Miami told William C. Sturtevant that they remembered the kalasa:Lî (Note: The orthography for Seminole names used in the Neill and Sturtevant sources was devised by Sturtevant.) (Calusa people), but regarded them as Spanish. They did not remember any Painted people, Bat necks, or Muspas. Frances Densmore recorded 17 songs from a Cow Creek (Muscogee-speaking) Seminole in 1932 that were said to be Calusa. According to the informant, the Seminole and Calusa had lived peaceably near each other for a while, and learned songs from each other. The two peoples later fought, and the Seminoles defeated the Calusa. Muscogulges dominated all of Florida after the departure of the Calusa in the 1760s, even attacking Spanish fishing vessels along the Florida coast (including at Key West) during the Seven Years' War (1756–1763). Bernard Romans reported using a "Spanish Indian" guide at the St. Lucie River in 1769. As Romans elsewhere reported the departure of all Calusa from Florida by 1763, this Spanish Indian was likely a Muscogulge rather than a Calusa.

Spanish records include lists of names of Florida Indians, eventually including hundreds each year, that visited Cuba between 1771 and 1823. Sturtevant notes that most of the names of chiefs and towns recorded by the Spanish appear to be Muscogee. While the remaining names may be Calusa, they may also be Muscogee names distorted by poor transcription and copying errors. (Note: Seminoles were generally known by their titles (the position they held), rather than a personal name. For example, Osceola is an Anglicized spelling of the Muscogee Asi-yahola, meaning "black drink cryer", one who called eligible adult males to the black drink ceremony. All Seminoles, whether they were Musgokee or Hitchiti/Mikasuki-speaking, were known by Muscogee titles.)

=== Other peoples ===
In 1952–1953, Miccosukees living west of Miami told Sturtevant that yathâmpa:Lî ("bad people") had also lived in Florida. The yathâmpa:Lî were said to have been found by the Spanish living south of present-day Ocala. The Spanish traded with and intermarried with the yathâmpa:Lî. At first, Seminoles also traded and intermarried with the yathâmpa:Lî. The Spanish later incited the yathâmpa:Lî to attack the Seminoles. The Seminoles defeated the yathâmpa:Lî and Spanish in a multi-day battle. (Sturtevant notes that there are similarities in the story of this battle with the 1702 Battle of Flint River, in which Muscogulges defeated an Apalachee-Spanish force.)

Wilfred T. Neill collected a story from a Cow Creek Seminole informant relating how a people called imá:la, who were big and ferocious, fought with the ko:ico:bî (Mikasuki for the Florida panther, possibly meaning the Panther or Tiger clan of the Miccosukee). The imá:la were driven away, but a few returned after the Second Seminole War and took refuge with the Miccosukee. Neill notes that imá:la resembles "Emola", the name of a Timucuan town in northeastern Florida mentioned by René Goulaine de Laudonnière.

=== Scholarly opinion ===
In 1952–1953, William Sturtevant interviewed Miccosukees in Florida about the presence of non-Seminole people in Florida. The Florida Miccosukees did not remember any "Bat Necks", "Painted People", or "Muspa" in Florida. The Miccosukee oral history did include the presence of kalasa:Lî (Calusa people), who were generally viewed as being Spanish. The Miccosukees identified § Chakaika's band of Spanish Indians as Mikasuki-speaking Seminoles. The Miccosukees believed that Chakaika's band, while long separated from them, shared a common ancestry.

Neill notes that the Spanish Indians were generally considered to be Calusa until Sturtevant's 1953 paper. Sturtevant stated that there were probably Calusa remnants in Southwest Florida in the early 19th century, and Neill stated it is possible that a few Calusa or Muspa remained in Florida and amalgamated with the Seminoles after the Spanish left. Neill also notes that no 19th century primary source identifies Spanish Indians as Calusa. In 1822, Jedidiah Morse, in a report to the U.S. secretary of war, said that the Calusa were extinct. The Calusa and other Pre-Columbian era Indigenous peoples of Florida, with the possible exception of those called "Spanish Indians", were gone by 1800. By 1829 Whites in south Florida referred only to Seminoles as being present.

Sturtevant concludes that there were several different Indian groups in Southwest Florida in early 19th century: Seminoles, persons of mixed Indian and Spanish ancestry, Choctaws (probably), and Calusa (probably). There are Seminole traditions of the presence of other non-Seminoles ("Bad People", Yuchi, and possibly, Koasati). The various Indians bands were at first very loosely associated, but later amalgamated into the Seminole tribe. The Spanish Indians were possibly Mikasuki-speakers who arrived in Florida earlier than other predecessors of Seminoles, and became closely associated with the Spanish. While some of the Spanish Indians may have been descended from Calusas, historians have now concluded that, at least in the 19th century, most of those people were descendants of Muscogulges, who elsewhere in Florida became known as Seminoles.

== Rancho Indians ==
One component of the Spanish Indians was "rancho Indians". Spanish fishing vessels from Cuba began fishing along the southwest Florida coast by the 1680s. By the 1740s, Cuban fishermen were employing guides and fishermen from the remaining Indigenous people in the Florida Keys. Many Spanish Indians worked at Spanish fishing stations, known as ranchos, from Jupiter Inlet south on the east coast and from Tampa Bay south on the west coast, and some intermarried with Spaniards. By the beginning of the 19th century, year-round fishing ranchos were established along the Florida coast between Tampa Bay and Estero Bay, and much of the fishing community resided there year-round. Other Seminoles also worked at the ranchos during the fishing season and left during the off-season. In 1831, by one account, four ranchos in the vicinity of Charlotte Harbor had as many as 300 residents total. Another account gave the population of ranchos between Tampa Bay and Charlotte Harbor in that year as 65 Spanish men, 65 Indian men, 30 Indian women, and 50 to 100 children.

William Whitehead, customs inspector in Key West, wrote in 1831 that the women at the fishing ranchos were all Indians, and that the color of their children's skins indicated that many were fathered by the Spaniards. William Bunce, who owned a fishing rancho in Tampa Bay, stated in 1838 that he had 10 Spaniards and 20 Spanish Indians working for him, and that most of the Spanish Indians had been born at the rancho, spoke Spanish, and "had never been in the country ten miles in their lives". He said that they worked for the Cuban fishermen from August until March, cultivated small plots and fished in the off-season, but did not hunt. He also said that many of the Spaniards working for him had Indian wives, and several had children and grand-children. Baptismal records from between 1807 and 1827 at a church in Regla (home port of the Spanish fishermen) include 20 children born to Spanish fathers and their Indian wives, 5 born to Indian women with no recorded father, and 3 with Indian parents.

Augustus Steele wrote to Wiley Thompson (Indian agent at Fort King) in 1835 concerning the legal status of those Spanish Indians. Steele declared that while the Indians and "half-bloods" were descended from Seminoles, they did not claim affiliation with the Seminoles, and were not claimed by the Seminoles. He also stated that they spoke Spanish, and that some had been baptised in Havana, and described them as "Spanish fishermen under the Spanish government", and "incapable of supporting themselves by ordinary Indian means". Steele indicated in a letter to Thompson that the Seminoles did not claim the Spanish Indians as members because they did not want to share the annuities they received from the government. Thompson's reply to Steele ruled that the Spanish Indians were bound by communication and family relationships to the Seminoles, and had to join the Seminoles on the reservation.

John Worth has stated that the Spanish Indians of the ranchos were neither Seminole nor Calusas, but a creole community that emerged in the 18th and early 19th centuries, consisting of Spanish Cuban fishermen and people predominantly descended from Muskogean-speaking people who were present in southwest Florida decades before the Seminoles.

== Other peoples in southwest Florida ==
Various people, including bands of Native Americans who were not closely tied to the Spanish fishing ranchos, also lived in southern Florida, and may have been thought of as "Spanish Indians". John Winslett, a white attorney working for the Creek (Muscogee) nation, was in Florida in 1833 tracking slaves who had escaped from Muscogee owners. He stated in an affidavit that he had been advised that it was unsafe to travel south of Tampa Bay in pursuit of runaway slaves because there were bands of "desperadoes, runaways, murderers, and thieves" between there and Charlotte Harbor, composed of Indians and Blacks, most of the latter being runaway slaves. Wiley Thompson wrote to Florida governor William Pope Duval at the beginning of 1834 about a settlement of "negroes, Indians, and Spaniards", southeast of Charlotte Harbor, "a lawless, motley crew". Wiley Thompson wrote in 1835 of unauthorized settlements of Blacks, Indians, and Spaniards in peninsular Florida, and stated that the Indians were descended from Seminoles. He also stated that there were "roving bands of Seminole Indians on and about the Everglades".

An 1837 report stated that Indians living on the coast south of Charlotte Harbor never went to the reservation agency, but traded produce, skins, and small live animals at the Spanish ranchos for guns, ammunition, and clothing. They may have also sometimes worked at the ranchos. Some bands were also in contact with Bahamian wreckers. They had not been represented at the treaty conferences with the U.S., and never agreed to leave Florida. There is evidence that at least some of those Indians spoke Muscogee.

There were four Seminole bands reported in southwest Florida in May 1839; one led by Arpieka (known as Sam Jones to English-speakers) with war chiefs Chitto Tustenuggee and Holata Mico, one led by Hospetarke with Passacka as war chief, one led by Otalke Thlocco (the Prophet), and the "Spanish Indians" led by Chakaika.

== Chakaika's band ==
The band of Spanish Indians that were led by Chakaika, including about 100 men of fighting age, lived in the Everglades in 1839–1840. They were said to speak their own language, a mixture of "Indian" and Spanish. Sturtevant allows that the language may have been Calusa, but he found no evidence to support that. Sturtevant notes that Hospetarke, a Seminole chief whose wife was Spanish, and some of his followers lived near Chakaika's band, and Holartoochee, a Seminole banished for adultery, lived with Chakaika's band until the outbreak of the Second Seminole War, when he rejoined his band, which he takes as indicators that Chakaika's band were Seminoles rather than Calusas. Chakaika was reported to have earlier been a fisherman and sailor at a Spanish fishing rancho, known as "Antonio Nikeka". He might have had a Spanish father or grandfather. He was described as being more than 6 feet (1.8 m) tall and weighing more than 200 pounds (91 kg). While Judge William Marvin of Key West blamed Chakaika for leading the attack on the settlements in the area of the Miami River in January 1836 and for an attack on Charlotte Harbor in April 1836 in which Henry Crews, customs collector for Charlotte Harbor, had been killed, other sources say that Chakaika's band stayed out of the Second Seminole War until 1839.

== Second Seminole War ==
=== Removal of rancho Indians and others ===
The start of the Second Seminole War at the end of 1835 brought trouble to southwest Florida. Rumors spread that Seminoles were planning to attack establishments around Tampa Bay. In April, customs inspector Henry Crews was murdered at Charlotte Harbor, and a party of 25 Seminoles led by Wyhokee raided the Useppa Island fishing rancho. Approximately 200 residents of fishing ranchos in the Charlotte Harbor area then fled to William Bunce's rancho on Tampa Bay. Later that year, the "old" ranchos in the vicinity of Sanibel Island were reported to be deserted and mostly destroyed. Other Spanish Indians still remained on the mainland. An 1837 Army excursion from the Caloosahatchee River to Cape Sable captured 243 prisoners. Thomas Lawson, then Surgeon General of the United States Army, led an expedition along the southwest coast of Florida in 1838, looking for Indian settlements. He found cleared fields and abandoned village sites, but no Indians.

The Army seized all persons with any Indian ancestry that they found at the ranchos. General Thomas Jesup, Army commander in Florida, stated that if he let any Spanish Indians stay in Florida, other Seminoles would refuse to go to the Indian Territory. In 1838, the Spanish Indian wives and children at Bunce's rancho, and even some of the Spaniards, were forced to emigrate to Indian Territory with the Seminoles. That year, 21 men who had been rounded up from Charlotte Harbor ranchos to be shipped to Indian Territory petitioned to be released on the grounds that they were Spanish, not Indians. Two of the men complained that their wives had been claimed by Holata Emathla as part of his band being sent to Indian Territory. In 1838, 80 Spaniards were reported to be among captives being sent to the Indian Territory from Florida. Seven Spaniards were allowed to stay in New Orleans when they promised not to return to Florida. A newspaper in Arkansas reported that one group of captives being taken to the Indian Territory included 150 Spanish Indians and Spaniards who had married Seminoles.

=== Chakaika's Spanish Indians enter war ===
In May 1839, General Alexander Macomb arranged a truce with the Seminoles. The Seminoles regarded the truce as permanent, while American officials regarded it as a pause that would ultimately make it easier to removed the Seminoles west. Macomb thought he had reached agreement with the principal leaders of the Seminoles in south Florida, but the men he met with apparently represented only one of four independent bands in the area. The four bands in southwest Florida in May 1839 were; one led by Arpieka with war chiefs Chitto Tustenuggee and Holata Mico (Billy Bowlegs), one led by Hospetarke with Passacka as war chief, one led by Otalke Thlocco (the Prophet), and the Spanish Indians led by Chakaika. Only Chitto Tustenuggee (war chief under Arpieka) had met with General Macomb. As the other leaders had not participated in the agreement for the truce, they may not have felt bound by it.

As part of the truce agreement, a trading post was established on the Caloosahatchee River, guarded by 25 soldiers under Colonel William S. Harney. In the meantime, the Seminoles learned that American officials still intended to remove them from Florida, a breach of the Seminoles' understanding of the agreement. On the morning of July 23, 1839, about 160 Indians attacked the trading post and Army camp in the Battle of Caloosahatchee. Colonel Harney escaped in his nightclothes, but half of the soldiers and some civilians were killed, either immediately or after being captured. The attack on the army camp was led by Chakaika, while Hospetarke led the attack on the trading post. Holatter Micco (war-chief of Arpeika's band) and Shonockhadjo (war-chief of Otalke-Thlocko's band) were other leaders in the attack. Worth states that Chakaika's entry into the war was a response to the destruction of the Spanish rancho system by the US Army in 1836–1839.

The next year, on August 7, 1840, Chakaika's band raided Indian Key, killing 13 residents. Chakaika's sister later told her American captors that three Spaniards had supplied the Spanish Indians with salt and ammunition, and that one of the Spaniards had advised the Spanish Indians to attack Indian Key. It is believed that the Indians understood Henry Perrine when he spoke to them in Spanish during the attack. The attackers were also heard speaking English. Goods from the store in Indian Key were found at the Spanish Indian camp later that year.

Colonel Harney, who had been surprised and humiliated by Chakaika's band in the Battle of Caloosahatchee, organized an expedition in December 1840 into the Everglades in search of Chakaika. He was guided by John, a former slave who said he had been captured by Chakaika when his master Henry Crews was killed in 1836 at Charlotte Harbor. John had surrendered to the Army at Fort Dallas in early 1840. He reported that Chakaika was planning to attack Indian Key, but he was not deemed credible, and was held as a prisoner. Navy Lieutenant John McLaughlin, leader of a force of sailors and marines who had searched the Everglades for Indians, tried to have John released to him as a guide to Chakaika's island, but was refused by the Army. He later complained that if he had been allowed to use John as a guide, the attack on Indian Key might have been prevented.

After some problems in finding his way, John led Harney's force to Chakaika's island. Disquised as Indians, Harney's men attacked Chakaika's island shortly after sunrise. No guards had been posted because Chakaika believed his island was beyond the reach of the Army. Chakaika was away from the camp chopping wood, and started to run when the attack began. He then stopped, turned, and offered his hand to a pursuing soldier, who shot him. Chakaika's corpse was hung beside two of his men who were hanged by Harney. Chakaika's wife, mother, and sister were captured. Four of the Spanish Indians were killed in the battle and five more hanged. Though some men escaped, the band was wiped out. Some Spanish Indians were reported to have attended a great council meeting (led by Arpieka, Hospetarke, and the Prophet) in the Big Cypress Swamp in April 1841, and several man from Chakaika's band attended the Miccosukee green corn dance in 1841. Twenty-four surviving women and children from Chakaika's band had been sent to Indian Territory by 1841. In 1952, the Miccosukee identified a hammock in the Everglades to Sturtevant as Chakaika's island. The hammock, south of the Tamiami Trail in the Shark River Slough, has been given the archaeological site identifier of 8DA69.

== Aftermath ==
Spanish Indians disappeared from Florida after 1840. Some Seminole families in Oklahoma claimed Spanish ancestry in 1932, but it is unclear whether they derived from Chakaika's band or from rancho Indians.

== See also ==
- Hispanicization
- Indian Reductions
- Ladino people
- Mission Indians
- Detribalization
- Praying Indian

== Sources ==
- Adams, George R. (April 1970). "The Caloosahatchee Massacre: Its Significance in the Second Seminole War". The Florida Historical Quarterly. 48 (4): 368–380.
- Boyd, Mark F.; Harris, Joseph W. (1951). "The Seminole War: Its Background and Onset". The Florida Historical Quarterly. 30 (1): 3–115. ISSN 0015-4113. JSTOR 30138833.
- Buker, George E. (January 1979). "The Mosquito Fleet's Guides and the Second Seminole War". The Florida Historical Quarterly. 57 (3): 311–326.
- Covington, James (1959). "Trade Relations Between Southwestern Florida and Cuba, 1600-1840". Florida Historical Quarterly. 38 (2). Florida Historical Society: 119 – via STARS.
- Covington, James W. (1993). The Seminoles of Florida. Gainesville, Florida: University Press of Florida. ISBN 978-0-8130-1196-7.
- Gatschet, Albert S. (1880). "The Timucua Language". Proceedings of the American Philosophical Society. 18 (105): 465–502. ISSN 0003-049X.
- Hammond, E. A. (1972). "The Spanish Fisheries of Charlotte Harbor". Florida Historical Quarterly. 51 (4): 355–380.
- Hann, John H. (2003). Indians of Central and South Florida 1513-1763. Gainesville, Florida: University Press of Florida. ISBN 0-8130-2645-8.
- Hodge, Frederick Webb (1907). Handbook of American Indians North of Mexico. Washington, D.C.: Smithsonian Institution. p. 963.
- MacMahon, Darcie A.; Marquardt, William H. (2004). The Calusa and Their Legacy: South Florida People and Their Environments. Gainesville, Florida: University Press of Florida. ISBN 0-8130-2773-X.
- Mahon, John K. (1992) [1967]. History of the Second Seminole War 1835–1842 (paperback ed.). Gainesville, Florida: University of Florida Press. ISBN 0-8130-1097-7.
- Neill, Wilfred T. (June 1955). "The Identity of Florida's "Spanish Indians"". The Florida Anthropologist. 8 (2): 43–58 – via University of Florida Digital Collection.
- Porter, Kenneth W. (1949). "The Founder of the "Seminole Nation" Secoffee or Cowkeeper". The Florida Historical Quarterly. 27 (4): 362–384. ISSN 0015-4113. JSTOR 30138772.
- Sturtevant, William C. (1953). "Chakaika and the "Spanish Indians"" (PDF). Tequesta. 13: 35–73. Archived from the original (PDF) on 2012-02-08 – via Digital Collections Florida International University.
- Swanton, John R. (1952). The Indian Tribes of North America. Washington, D.C.: Smithsonian Institution. pp. 125–28. ISBN 9780806317304.
- Tebeau, Charlton W. (1968) [1964]. Man in the Everglades (Second, revised ed.). Coral Gables, Florida: University of Miami Press. LCCN 68-17768.
- Worth, John E. (2012). "Creolization in Southwest Florida: Cuban Fishermen and "Spanish Indians," ca. 1766—1841". Historical Archaeology. 46 (1): 142–160.
- Wright, J. Leitch Jr. (1986). Creeks and Seminoles. Lincoln, Nebraska: University of Nebraska Press. ISBN 0-8032-9728-9.
