= Gad Humphreys =

Indian agent in Florida

Gad Humphreys (? – October 25, 1859) was an officer in the United States Army and an Indian agent in Florida. He was appointed to his post in 1822. He was supportive of the Indians and tried to help them and protect them from encroachments by White settlers. He was accused of abusing his post by preventing or delaying the return to their owners of fugitive slaves that had taken refuge with the Indians. An investigation was conducted, but none of his accusers were willing to testify. Even so, he was removed from his post in 1830.

== Army ==
Humphreys was from New York. He was commissioned as a first lieutenant in the 6th Infantry Regiment of the United States Army in 1808. He was promoted to captain in 1809, and to major in the 4th Infantry Regiment in 1814. He was discharged from the Army in 1815, in a reduction in force in the army at the end of the War of 1812. He was reinstated as a captain in the 6th Infantry Regiment at the end of 1815, with a brevet rank of major. He was promoted to major in 1817 and to lieutenant colonel in the 2nd Infantry Regiment in 1820. After 13 years of service, Humphreys was discharged in 1821 as a result of another reduction in force in the army.

== Appointment as Indian agent ==
Humphreys was appointed Indian agent for the Florida Territory in May 1822. Humphreys was supposed to be in charge of organizing and running a conference with the Indians in Florida that was scheduled to take place starting on November 20, 1822, but he was not yet in Florida, and governor William Pope Duval left the territory to attend to personal business. Some Indian leaders showed up for the conference, but left after three days because no government officials had arrived, a great embarrassment for the territorial government. Humphreys took up his position as Indian agent in Pensacola in late December 1822, but did not receive instructions on his duties until the next month. In the summer of 1823, Humphreys conducted about 350 members of Indian bands that lived west of the Suwannee River, including the Miccosukees, Tallahassees, and Apalachicola band, almost 300 miles (480 km) from St. Marks to the conference site 5 miles (8.0 km) south of St. Augustine where the Treaty of Moultrie Creek was negotiated.

The Miccosukees and Tallahassees were reluctant to move to the new reservation, and Humphreys argued against moving them too quickly, even while Governor Duval was pressuring them to move. Humphreys also criticized the provision in the treaty that allowed Neamathla and the Apalachicola band to remain on small reservations along the Apalachicola River while the other bands west of the Suwannee had to move to the reservation in central Florida. Then, in July 1824, as Duval was personally confronting Neamathla over the move, Humphreys left Florida without notifying the governor he was taking leave. The Indians complained that the reservation was not large enough to support them. Benjamin Chaires, who had won the contract to supply rations to the Indians on the reservation, stated that the land in the reservation was the poorest in the state. Humphreys and other Whites agreed that the reservation needed to be enlarged.

In 1825, severe drought resulted in a poor corn crop for the Seminoles. Humphreys authorized a hunting party of Seminoles to leave the reservation in search of game. In early June a plantation owner in St. Johns County reported a hostile encounter with a Seminole hunting party looking for three missing members of the party. A detachment of soldiers from Fort Marion, accompanied by White civilians, found the Seminoles at Cabbage Swamp, north of St. Augustine. The Seminoles were wary of the large White party and fled, and the Whites fired at them. One Seminole suffered a broken arm. Since the hunting party had been authorized by Humphreys, the Seminoles were allowed to return to the reservation. Their report of the incident, however, led the Seminoles to prepare for war. Troops were dispatched from Fort Brooke and Fort Marion to the Indian agency that had been established by Humphreys at Silver Springs, (Note: Humphreys claimed that the springs were unknown to White men until he found them in 1825 after following Indian trails from Tampa Bay into the interior of Florida. A deep stream, the Silver River connected the springs to the St. Johns River via the Oklawaha River, a much easier route for supplying the agency (and later, Fort King) than the 100-mile (160 km) overland road from Tampa Bay.) the missing men turned up, a physician from Fort Marion was sent to treat the broken arm, and war was averted.

Government rations had never been adequate, and ended in October 1825, and some Seminoles starved to death. Humphreys was among the officials who requested more rations be issued, and the government did so. Starving Seminoles left or turned back from moving to the reservation, and killed cattle belonging to White settlers. While Humphreys felt that the Alachua County (Note: Alachua County then encompassed most of the territory north and west of the reservation.) militia should have been able to repel the wandering Seminoles, the settlers blamed Humphreys from not bringing in regular Army troops, and accused him of condoning the Seminoles' excursions off of the reservation.

In May 1826, Humphreys accompanied seven Seminole leaders, including Neamathla of the Apalachicola band, Tuckose Emathla (called "John Hicks" by English speakers) of the Miccosukees, Micanopy, chief of the Alachua Seminoles, Holata Micco, of the Peace River band, Tulce Emathla, and Fuche Luste Hadjo, also of the Alachua Seminoles, to Washington, D.C. to meet with James Barbour, United States Secretary of War.

The next month, the government convened a conference of Seminoles to elect a chief for all of the bands in Florida. The main contenders were Micanopy and Tuckose Emathla, who was also backed by the Miccosukees and Tallahassees. The conference was held in July at the Indian agency at Silver Springs. When it looked like violence might result from the rivalry of the factions, Humphreys requested troops be sent from Cantonment Brooke (on Tampa Bay) to help maintain peace. Tuckose Emathla was elected and installed as the supreme chief of the Seminole nation without disturbance.

Many officials wanted an Army post closer to the reservation than Tampa Bay. The Army at first proposed a temporary post on the Suwannee River, but Humphreys and others protested that place was too far from the reservation. As a result, the new post, which became Fort King, was placed 0.25 miles (0.40 km) from Humphreys' Indian agency. Humphreys tried to defend the Seminoles against White settlers so strongly that a grand jury presented an indictment against him in 1827.

== Fugitive slaves ==
Ownership of Black slaves was a major disruptive issue between White Americans and the Seminoles of Florida for most of the first half of the 19th century. The issue was important in the attempt to seize East Florida from Spain in 1812 and the First Seminole War of the late 1810s. Moreover, many Blacks, including runaway slaves, were allies of the Seminoles, and some served as interpreters for and advisors to the Seminoles.

After Florida was transferred from Spain to the United States in 1821, two important issues for the U.S. government were to remove Indians from land in northern Florida that was attracting White settlers, and to recover slaves that had run away from White and Indian owners in the United States and taken shelter with the Seminoles in Florida. The 1823 Treaty of Moultrie Creek required most of the Indians in Florida to move to a reservation in the center of the Florida peninsula. Article seven of the treaty also required the Seminoles to prevent runaway slaves or fugitives from justice from entering or passing through the reservation, and to deliver such runaways and fugitives to an Indian agent. The treaty required a census of the Seminoles, but Neamathla, who had been elected chief negotiator by the participating bands for the treaty, refused to provide a specific number for the Blacks living with the Seminoles.

Legal procedures for handling disputes between Whites and Indians over ownership of slaves had been established, but failed to ease the problem. Indians usually refused to surrender disputed slaves before their status was resolved in court, saying the slaves in White possession were never returned to Indians, even when a court ruled that they belonged to an Indian. Indians also believed that Whites intended to seize all Blacks, regardless of their legal ownership or status. White settlers, on the other hand, complained that even when they had bought slaves from the Indians, the slaves tended to slip away and return to the Indians. Some settlers advocated military force to "recover pilfered property" from the Seminoles.

== Accusations and investigation ==
Humphreys was charged with obstructing the return of runaway slaves in hopes that the loss of time and money would dissuade the owners from pursuing their claims. It was also charged that Humphreys had used runaway slaves on his own land for months before returning them to their owners. Despite orders about not doing business with the Indians for whom he was appointed agent, Humphreys was involved in the slave trade with the Seminoles. It was also claimed that he had "connived with the Indians in the concealment of runaway slaves", and that he had then purchased those slaves at reduced prices.

Humphreys' efforts to protect and help the Seminoles made many White settlers his enemies. While Seminoles, despite turning many fugitive slaves in for return to their owners, despaired of recovering their own slaves that had been taken by Whites. White settlers claimed that Humphreys had been remiss in his duty to return fugitive slaves to them. Governor Duval and Humphreys were increasingly at odds over the issue, and Duval stopped communicating with Humphreys. A federal investigation was started, but Humphreys' strongest critics would not testify. The inquiry's main finding was that Humphrey probably had improperly billed the government for improvements to his plantation. In 1828, Duval withheld the government annuity to the Seminoles on the grounds that they had not surrendered all of the fugitive slaves in their custody. Humphreys challenged the withholding of the annuity, and a court ruled that the annuity could not be withheld. Andrew Jackson was elected president of the United States that year, and Duval asked him to remove Humphreys and the judge who had ruled against withholding the annuity. Jackson removed Humphreys from his position in 1830.

== Later life ==
After being dismissed from the post of Indian agent, Humphreys lived as a planter. He worked for a while with John McIntosh on his Oaklands Plantation, and later established his own Pilgrimage Plantation near Micanopy, north of the northern boundary of the reservation, the Indian agency, and Fort King. A number of his slaves fled to the Seminoles in 1830, but were returned to him in 1833. Soon after, however, 25 of those slaves again fled to the Seminoles, and in 1836, after the start of the Second Seminole War, another 34 were captured by the Seminoles. Humphreys later tried to claim his slaves from among the Blacks that were to be sent west with captured and surrendered Seminoles. General Thomas Jesup denied Humphrey's claim on the Blacks because he believed that Humphreys had acquired the slaves illegally. Humphreys had apparently bought all or most of his slaves from Seminoles. Whites had been barred from purchasing slaves from Seminoles, and, while he was Indian agent, Humphreys had been barred from trading with the Seminoles.

Humphreys' plantation was fortified by the Army in June 1836 and named Fort Defiance. The position of the Army in central Florida deteriorated during the summer of 1836. So many soldiers were sick that Fort King was evacuated by early June of that year. Fort Drane, another fortified plantation about 20 miles (32 km) northwest of Fort King and less than 10 miles (16 km) from Fort Defiance, was abandoned in early August. Fort Defiance was abandoned later that month, leaving all of Florida south of Newnansville and Black Creek and west of the St. Johns River to the Indians. Fort Defiance, and Humphrey's plantation buildings were burned when the fort was abandoned to deny resources to the Indians. Humphreys later petitioned for compensation for his destroyed property from the U.S. government.

He moved to St. Augustine. He died there in 1859.

== Sources ==
- Covington, James W. (1993). The Seminoles of Florida. Gainesville, Florida: University Press of Florida. ISBN 0-8130-1196-5.
- Eby, Cecil D. (October 1962). "Memoir of a West Pointer in Florida: 1825". The Florida Historical Quarterly. 41 (2): 154–164 – via PALMM State University Libraries of Florida.
- Heitman, Francis B. (1903). Historical Register and Dictionary of the United States Army. Washington: (U.S.) Government Printing Office.
- Klos, George (July 1989). "Blacks and the Seminole Removal Debate, 1821–1835". The Florida Historical Quarterly. 68 (1): 55–78 – via PALMM State University Libraries of Florida.
- Littlefield, Daniel F. Jr. (2001) [1977]. Africans and Seminoles from Removal to Emancipation (Paperback ed.). Jackson, Mississippi: University Press of Mississippi. ISBN 1-57806-360-4 – via Google Books.
- Mahon, John K. (1985) [1967]. History of the Second Seminole War 1835–1842 (Paperback ed.). Gainesville, Florida: University Presses of Florida. ISBN 0-8130-1097-7.
- Ott, Eloise R. (July 1967). "Fort King: A Brief History". The Florida Historical Quarterly. 46 (1): 29–38 – via PALMM State University Libraries of Florida.
- Pearcy, Matthew T. (Fall 2006). "'The Ruthless Hand of War': Andrew A. Humphreys in the Second Seminole War". The Florida Historical Quarterly. 85 (2): 125–153 – via PALMM State University Libraries of Florida.
- "Gad Humphreys". House Report, United States Congress. 29th Congress, 1st Session (Report No. 203): 1–5. February 10, 1846 – via University of Oklahoma College of Law Digital Commons.
