= Battle of the Caloosahatchee =

Second Seminole War battle

- Part of Second Seminole War
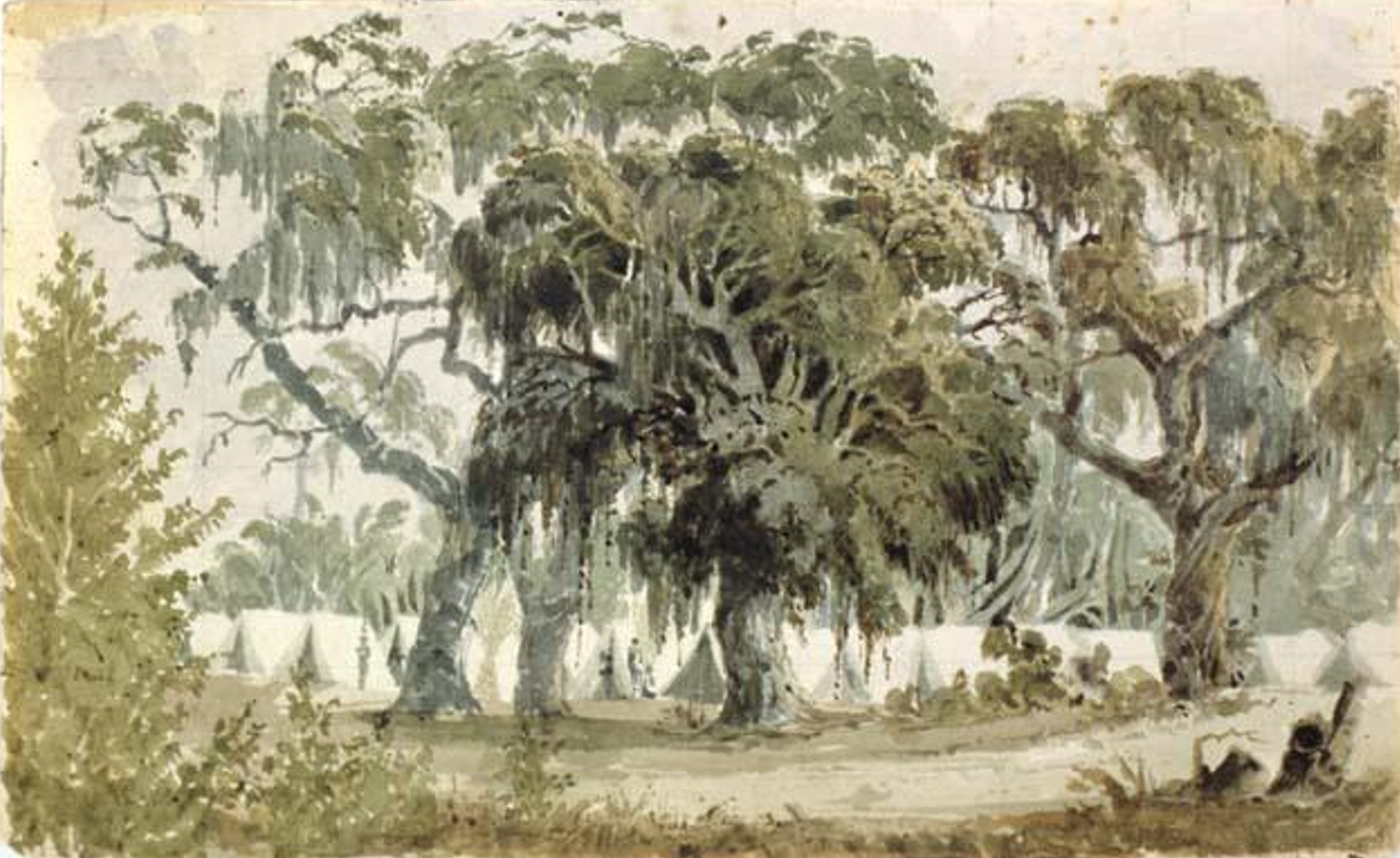
- A U.S. Army encampment in South Florida
Date	July 23, 1839
Location	Lee County, Florida
Result	Seminole victory: Collapse of the Macomb Treaty

Belligerents
United States	Seminole

Commanders and leaders
William Harney; John Bigelow †	Abiaka; Billy Bowlegs; Chekaika

Strength
28	150

Casualties and losses
16 soldiers killed 4 civilian traders killed 2 Black Seminole scouts captured	None

The Battle of the Caloosahatchee, also called the Caloosahatchee Massacre, was a battle that took place during the Second Seminole War on July 23, 1839. A large, diverse group of allied Native Americans attacked a trading post and U.S. Army encampment along the Caloosahatchee River near modern North Fort Myers. The U.S. Army troops were part of the 2nd Cavalry Regiment and under the command of Lieutenant Colonel William Harney. The native attackers were from various bands of Miccosukee, Muscogee, Seminole and Spanish Indians.

The battle happened because the natives learned that the United States intended to violate the terms of the Macomb Treaty, a peace treaty they had recently negotiated with General Alexander Macomb that would allow them to remain in Florida. The Seminole warriors overran the trading post and encampment, killing most of the soldiers and civilian traders. Harney and some of his soldiers managed to escape at the last moment. The battle led to a resumption of fighting as the war would continue for three more years.

== Background ==
In May 1839 during a parley between William Harney and Abiaka at Fort Lauderdale, Harney asked Abiaka to try negotiating a peace treaty with the United States. Abiaka agreed to Harney's proposal, and he decided to send one of his warriors named Chitto Tustenuggee (Snake Warrior) to be his emissary for the treaty negotiations. Harney then escorted Chitto Tustenuggee to Fort King, where the treaty negotiations would take place. After reaching the fort, Chitto Tustenuggee then talked with U.S. Army General Alexander Macomb, and they eventually came to a peace agreement. The terms of the peace agreement were that the allied tribes collectively called the Seminole, would be allowed to remain in Florida, as long as they stayed south of the Peace River. Another term of the peace agreement was that the U.S. Army would build a trading post on the Caloosahatchee River for the natives to buy and trade goods. Harney and his unit would later be assigned to build this trading post which was about 15 miles from the mouth of the river along the north shore. This peace agreement would become known as the Macomb Treaty.

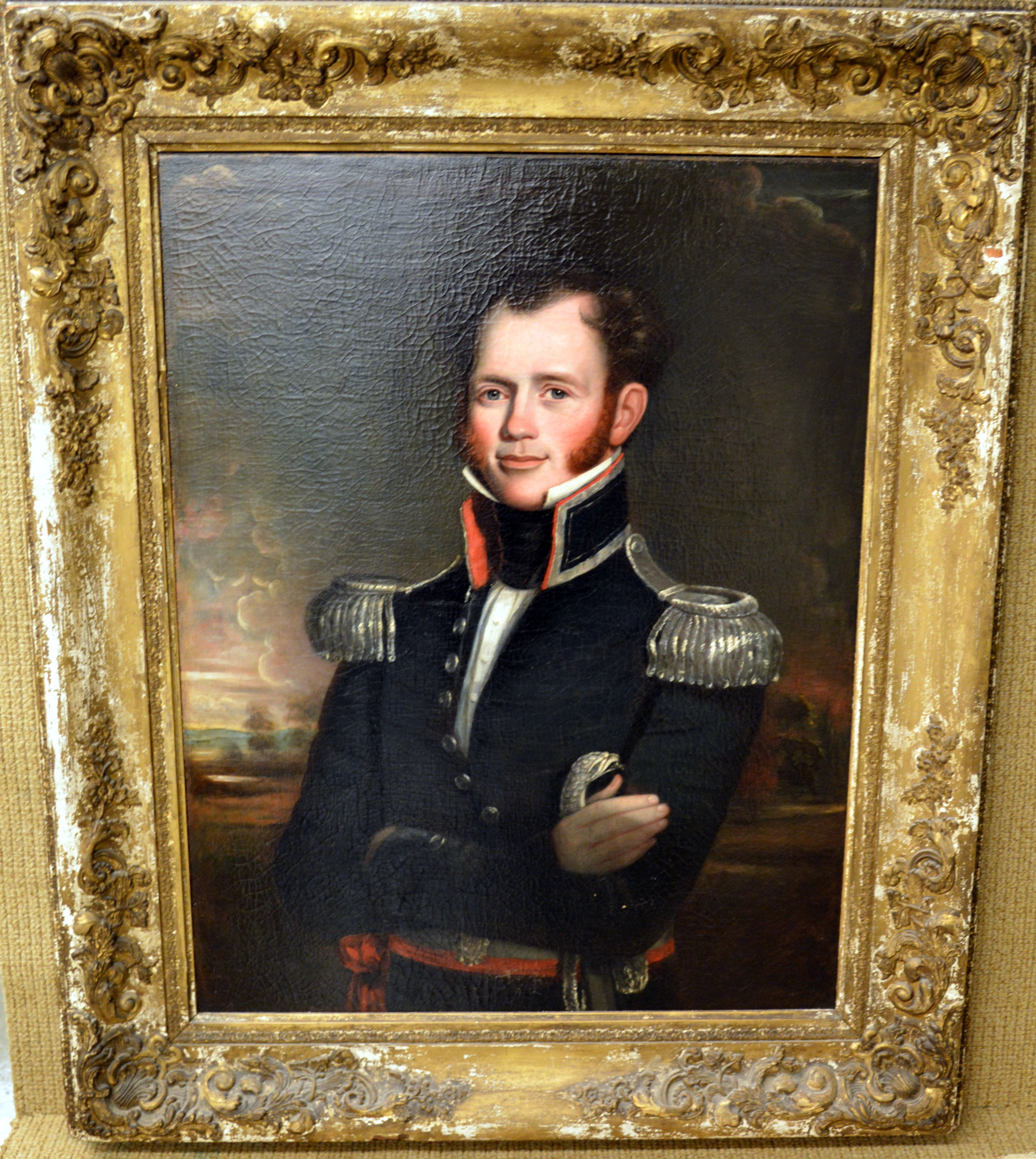
Portrait of William Harney during the 1830s

The terms of the Macomb Treaty enraged the new American settlers of Territorial Florida. These White Floridians wanted the total removal of all natives from Florida, as they considered Native American presence in Florida to be a threat to their security. In order to calm these settlers, Secretary of War Joel Poinsett wrote a letter in which he stated that the Macomb Treaty was only supposed to be a temporary peace agreement, and that the U.S. Government would remove all the Seminoles later in the future. Poinsett's letter was widely distributed throughout Florida, and the Seminoles themselves eventually learned about the contents of the letter. The Seminoles believed they had been deceived after they learned the U.S. Government secretly intended for the peace treaty to only be temporary, and they came to regard the Macomb Treaty as fraudulent. The Seminoles decided to continue fighting. Abiaka decreed that the Seminoles would attack Harney's soldiers and the trading post on the Caloosahatchee River.

== Battle ==
The U.S. Army encampment on the north shore of the Caloosahatchee was fifteen miles from the mouth of river and constructed about 400 yards from the trading post which was left unguarded at the time of the battle. Shortly before the native attack, Harney traveled to Sanibel Island to hunt for wild hogs. During Harney's absence, the man in charge of the camp was Sergeant John Bigelow, who neglected his duty to post guards around the camp. Sergeant Bigelow also neglected to hand out ammunition for the soldiers' new Colt rifles. When Harney returned to the camp, he was very exhausted from his hunting trip, and he immediately went to bed without posting any guards either.

The native attack began at dawn on July 23, 1839. The raiders divided into two groups, one of which attacked the trading post and the other attacked the U.S. Army camp. The U.S. soldiers were taken completely by surprise, as they were still in their beds and had no ammunition for their rifles. The natives quickly managed to kill most of the soldiers (including Sergeant Bigelow) and all of the civilian employees of the trading post. Harney, who was only wearing his underwear, escaped by immediately getting out of his bed and diving into the Caloosahatchee River. Some other soldiers also escaped by fleeing into the river, and they managed to reunite with Harney later. While hiding from the native attackers, Harney and the remainder of his men were then rescued by a sloop that had come from Tampa Bay. The allied natives looted a large amount of silver coins, alcohol, gunpowder, and other goods from the trading post. The Seminole allies also captured 30 Colt ring lever rifles from Harney's soldiers, which were the most advanced rifles the U.S. Army had at the time.

== Aftermath ==
The battle nullified the Macomb Treaty and it led to the continuation of the Second Seminole War. The Macomb Treaty was the greatest attempt made at a peace treaty during the war, but it ultimately failed. The war would end three years later without a formal peace treaty, when Colonel William Worth ordered all U.S. troops in Florida to end military operations in 1842. Harney would continue fighting in the war, and he later succeeded in finding and killing Chekaika, one of the allied native leaders at Caloosahatchee. However, Harney was unsuccessful in finding Abiaka during his searches for him in the Everglades.

Two prisoners the Seminoles took from the Battle of the Caloosahatchee were two Black Seminole men named Sampson Forrester and Sandy Perryman, who were both taken into the Big Cypress Swamp. Forrester and Perryman were initially loyal to the Seminole tribe at the start of the war, but they later defected to the United States in exchange for getting to live as Free Blacks. Due to the fact that they had lived among the Seminole, Forrester and Perryman were both employed by the U.S. Army as scouts and interpreters. Sandy Perryman himself was Harney's personal interpreter, and he had also been the main interpreter for the Macomb Treaty negotiations at Fort King. The native tribes blamed Sandy Perryman for convincing them to agree to the fraudulent Macomb Treaty, and Abiaka ordered Perryman to be executed. The natives executed Sandy Perryman by tying him to a pine tree, sticking splinters of fatwood into his body, and lighting them on fire, which killed Perryman after several hours of agonizing pain. Sampson Forrester was also going to be executed, but Holata Micco (Billy Bowlegs) interceded on Forrester's behalf, saying Forrester should not be executed as he had been a friend of Osceola. The allied native leaders decided to spare Sampson Forrester, but they continued to hold him captive for two years until he escaped back to the U.S. Army in 1841. After escaping from captivity, Sampson Forrester revealed that it was Chief Abiaka who ordered the allied native attack at Caloosahatchee.
