= Abiaka =

Miccosukee war chief and medicine man (c. 1781–c. 1866)

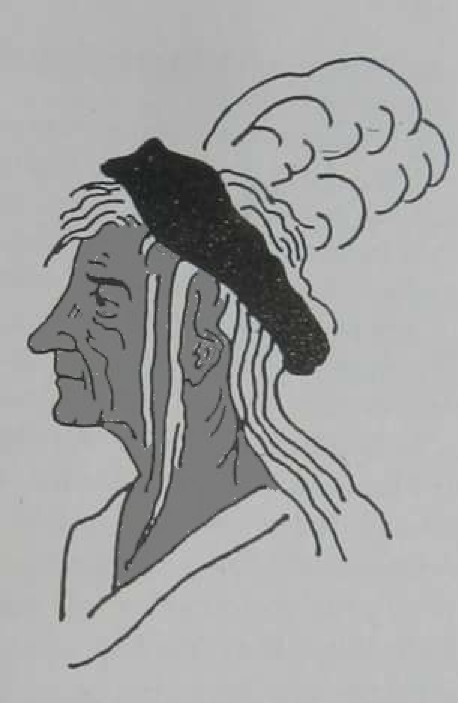
- The only depiction of Abiaka during his lifetime in 1839

Seminole-Miccosukee leader
- In office 1837–1866
- Preceded by: Micanopy

Principal Chief of the Florida Seminoles

Personal details
- Born: c. 1781 Near Flint River, Georgia, U.S.
- Died: c. 1866 (aged 84-85) Big Cypress Swamp, Florida, U.S.
- Children: At least 4
- Known for: Fought in the Seminole Wars, resulting in the continued existence of the Seminole tribe in Florida.
- Mother tongue: Mikasuki
- Nickname: Sam Jones

Military service
- Battles/wars: Seminole Wars; Second Seminole War; Battle of Lake Okeechobee; Battles of the Loxahatchee; Battle of Pine Island Ridge; Battle of the Caloosahatchee; Third Seminole War

Abiaka, also known as Sam Jones, (c. 1781 – c. 1866) was a Seminole-Miccosukee chief, warrior, and shaman who fought against the United States during the Seminole Wars. He was born among the Miccosukee people of Georgia, who would migrate south into Florida and become part of the Seminole tribe. He initially rose to prominence among the Seminoles as a powerful shaman. Abiaka became the principal chief of the Seminoles in 1837 during the Seminole Wars. He was a guerrilla warfare tactician and he led the Seminoles at the Battle of Lake Okeechobee, the largest battle of the conflict. Abiaka successfully resisted the United States and its policy of Indian removal, and his leadership resulted in the continued presence of the Seminole people in Florida.

== Name ==
The phonetic spelling of his native name varies to include: Aripeka, Aripeika, Opoica, Arpeika, Abiaka, Apiaka, Apeiaka, Appiaca, Appiacca, Apayaka Hadjo (Crazy Rattlesnake), and Ar-pi-uck-i. The name is derivative of the Muscogee word, Abihka, the name of an ancient Muscogee town near the upper Coosa River, meaning "pile at the base" or "heap at the root." The name was conferred on the town because "in the contest for supremacy its warriors heaped up a pile of scalps, covering the base of the war-pole."

The nickname Sam Jones was the name he was most commonly known by to White people. The origin of the nickname is from before the Second Seminole War, when Abiaka would visit Fort Brooke to sell trout fish. Because he sold fish so often, the U.S. soldiers at the fort nicknamed him Sam Jones after a popular song at the time called "Sam Jones the Fisherman" (Which was a parody of the French song "Dunois the Young and Brave").

== Early life ==
Abiaka was born in 1781 among the Miccosukee people, who at the time lived in Georgia around the Flint River. He was born into the Panther Clan through his mother's lineage. Abiaka's ancestors lived under the Capachequi Chiefdom of the Mississippian culture. Shortly after the end of the U.S. War of Independence, the Miccosukees migrated south into Florida where they joined the Seminole tribe. The Miccosukees built a large village near the eponymously named Lake Miccosukee, where Abiaka would live during his youth. After the First Seminole War many of the Miccosukees migrated further south into Central Florida. During this time in Abiaka's life the Miccosukee band of Seminoles were led by Chief Kinache, who was sometimes called "The King of the Miccosukees".

Abiaka was first written about in the 1820s, when Florida historian John Lee Williams wrote that Abiaka was residing at the village of Oakhumke in Lake County, Florida. John Lee Williams also wrote that at this time Abiaka had become a chief and that he was "a popular warrior among the Seminoles". In his adulthood Abiaka was described as being physically: "of slight elastic frame, six feet high, a mild benevolent countenance, very small feet, long bony hands". Abiaka was inspired by the ideology of Tecumseh, and he later copied Tecumseh's use of a prophet (Tenskwatawa) by appointing his own prophet named Otulkee Thlocco during the Second Seminole War.

== Prelude to Second Seminole War ==
In 1830, U.S. President Andrew Jackson signed the Indian Removal Act with the goal of ethnically cleansing the Seminole people from Florida. The U.S. Government tried to make the Seminoles acquiesce to their removal from Florida by making them sign treaties that supported the Indian Removal policy. Abiaka was one of the Seminole chiefs that signed both the Treaty of Payne's Landing in 1832 and the Treaty of Fort Gibson in 1833, both of which stated that the Seminoles must leave Florida. However most of the Seminole chiefs later claimed that they were coerced through threats of force to sign these treaties, and that they never agreed to the terms of these treaties. President Andrew Jackson later appointed former Congressman Wiley Thompson to oversee the removal of the Seminoles from Florida.

Abiaka and Osceola were both the most outspoken opponents among the Seminoles against the Indian Removal policy. In March 1835, Abiaka and the other Seminole chiefs attended a meeting at Fort King with U.S. official Wiley Thompson and General Duncan Clinch. Abiaka hated both Wiley Thompson and General Clinch, and during the meeting he showed his disapproval of the Indian Removal policy by angrily stomping his feet on the wooden platform that the meeting was being held at. Abiaka's angry stomping eventually broke the wooden platform, causing Wiley Thompson, General Clinch, and the Seminole chiefs to all fall to the ground.

== Seminole Wars ==
- Battle of Lake Okeechobee – Colonel Zachary Taylor led 1,032 troops against the Creek and Miccosukee on December 25, 1837, near the mouth of Taylor Creek and Lake Okeechobee and suffered a defeat. Taylor suffered 26 killed and 112 wounded. Abiaka was the leading war chief for the Miccosukee and he carefully formulated and executed his battle plan wisely—entrenched on dry, treed ground, pressing the attack, and losing only 8 (11) and 14 wounded. Then he and his men retired into the swamp. Taylor chose to charge across open water. After the battle Zachary Taylor and the U.S. claimed victory and then fell back a considerable distance towards Tampa. The Battle of Lake Okeechobee was Florida's most significant and bloodiest battle of the Second Seminole war and a major victory for the Seminoles. The battlefield was listed in the National Register of Historic Places in the 1960s, later became a National Historic Landmark, and is recognized by the National Trust for Historic Preservation as one of the top endangered historical sites in the U.S.
- Battle of Jupiter Inlet – On January 15, 1838, lieutenant Levin M. Powell of the U. S. Navy was sent by Thomas Jesup to explore the southwest fork of the Loxahatchee River. Powell's force of fifty-five sailors and twenty-five soldiers engaged Abiaka and his band at Jupiter Inlet. Powell suffered five men killed and twenty-two wounded.
- Battle of Pine Island Ridge – During the Second Seminole War (1835–1842) in the Battle of Pine Island Ridge, March 22, 1838, Abiaka led an unknown number of Seminoles against 223 Tennessee Volunteer Militia and 38 U.S. regular troops led by Major William Lauderdale. The Battle of Pine Island Ridge, in which the soldiers were forced to attack the Pine Island Ridge hammock through waist deep water while being fired upon from the cover of the island, was a victory for the Seminoles. This battle was U.S. retaliation for the Cooley Massacre of January 6, 1836, in which approximately twenty Seminoles attacked the home of William Cooley in the trading settlement on the New River, which was eight miles distant from the Pine Island Ridge hammock, killing Mrs. Cooley, the Cooley children, and another New River resident Joseph Flinton, the children's tutor. The Seminoles then looted and burned the Cooley farm, but did not attack other New River residents.
- In 1841, the year before the close of the Seminole War, Abiaka occupied the region near the mouth of the Kissimmee River and the eastern border of Lake Okeechobee.

== Final years and death ==
The first report about Abiaka after the end of the Seminole Wars was in 1859, when Abiaka and his people looted the shipwreck of a slave ship at Jupiter Inlet. In 1860, Abiaka married a 20-year old Seminole woman of the Otter Clan, who would later give birth to Abiaka's daughter and last child in 1864.

He died in Florida.

== Legacy ==
- James Ryder Randall wrote a poem praising Abiaka in 1859 called "The Unbought Seminole". In the poem Abiaka is referred to as "Arpeik."
- The town of Aripeka in Pasco County, Florida is named after Abiaka.
- A statue depicting Abiaka leading Seminole women and children to safety during the Battle of Pine Island Ridge was built in Davie, Florida at Tree Tops Park. A copy of this statue is also at the Ah-Tah-Thi-Ki Museum at Big Cypress Reservation.
- The Ah-Tha-Thi-Ki ("to learn") Museum on the Seminole Big Cypress Reservation is located near where Abiaka is believed to be buried.
- A bronze statue of Abiaka which includes Abiaka alongside various animals that symbolize the animal clans of the Seminole tribe is located at the Seminole Big Cypress Reservation. This group statue monument is one of the largest bronze statues in the southeastern U.S.
- A rock outcrop area on Mars was named "Seminole" by NASA. The two targets on this outcrop named "Abiaka" and "Osceola" were probed and studied during the Thanksgiving weekend, 2005, by the Mars Exploration Rover, Spirit
