= Iola, Florida =

Unincorporated community in Calhoun County

Iola (or Yawolla) was a town in Florida on the west side of the Apalachicola River during the 19th- and early 20th-centuries, about Midway between the confluence of the Chattahoochee and Flint rivers and the mouth of river. It was first known as a Native American town belonging to the Apalachicola band. It served briefly as a railroad terminus on the river, and later became a sportsman's resort.

== Native American town ==
The town of Yawolla first appeared on maps produced by George Woodbine of the Royal Marines in 1814, and by Vicente Sebastián Pintado, surveyor in Spanish Florida, in 1815. Captain Hugh Young, a topographical engineer serving under Andrew Jackson during the First Seminole War, included the town of "Ehawhohasles" in a report on the Native American towns in or near the part of Florida in which Jackson's army operated. Young placed Ehawhohasles, led by Chief Apiokhija, on the Apalachicola River 12 miles (19 km) below the town of Ocheesee. Worth notes that "Yawolla" appears on the Pintado map at about the location of Young's "Ehawhohasles", and says it is identical to the town of Iola headed by John Blount. White places Iola or Yawolla adjacent to or overlapping Ehawhohasles. An alternate form of "Iola" was "Iolee".

John Blount (Laukaufa), a Tukabatchee leader who backed the United States in the 1813—1814 Creek War and the First Seminole War, had moved with his people to the Apalachicola River near Prospect Bluff after 1816 to escape attacks by Muscogee Red Sticks. By end of the Second Spanish period in 1821 Iola and other Native American towns on the Apalachicola River had merged into the Apalachicola band. Yellow Hair had been the principal chief over five towns, but by the time the United States acquired Florida in 1821, he had been replaced by John Blunt. John Blunt and other leaders of the Apalachicola band and Neamathla, leader of a Mikasuki town east of the Apalachicola River, met with Andrew Jackson in 1821 to discuss their fate under American control.

The 1823 Treaty of Moultrie Creek assigned the people led by John Blunt and Tuski Hadjo to a reservation of 4 miles (6.4 km) along the Apalachicola River, extending 2 miles (3.2 km) from the river. The United States soon began pressuring and then forcing Native Americans in Florida to move west of the Mississippi River. In 1832, the United States negotiated a treaty with John Blunt and Davy, successor to Tuski Hadjo, for the people of Yawolla, or Iola, to give up their reservation in Florida and move west of the Mississippi. Blount and his people left the Apalachicola River for Texas in 1834.

== Railroad terminal ==
In 1837, the Lake Wimico and St. Joseph Canal and Railroad Company began construction of a rail line from St. Joseph, on the Gulf Coast at St. Joseph Bay, to Iola (now known as Iola Landing [30.1617°N 85.1413°W]), 28 miles (45 km) from St. Joseph. The new rail line was completed in October, 1839, and a railroad terminal and a couple of warehouses were built, with a 1,000-foot (300 m) dock on the river. People were settling in Iola by 1837, and a post office was established in 1838. Mail was carried between Iola and St. Joseph twice a week by the railroad as soon as it was completed in 1839. A town plat covering about 35 acres (14 ha) was recorded. The 1840 Federal Census counted 78 whites in Iola.

Besides the railroad structures, Iola had a steam sawmill, a gristmill, a hotel, (Note: Samuel Hamilton Walker was the proprietor of the hotel and wrote several letters to his brother in Texas about life in Iola.) and a bank. Despite the completion of the railroad to St. Joseph, Iola was already in decline. There were about 100 people in Iola in 1839, but money was in short supply, the bank had closed, and property values were falling. The Second Seminole War further affected Iola. A family on a local farm was killed by Seminoles in 1840, and residents in Iola reported hearing gunfire across the Apalachicola River every night.

A yellow fever epidemic devastated St. Joseph in 1841, drastically reducing the population and commerce of the city. A hurricane later that year destroyed the railroad's 1,500-foot (460 m) wharf at St. Joseph. The railroad went bankrupt and its movable equipment was auctioned off in 1842. St. Joseph was abandoned. Iola may have also been much diminished after 1842, but the post office remained open until September 1, 1845, and a letter written that year by Florida governor William Dunn Moseley listed Iola as the county seat of Calhoun County.

== Resort ==
The center of Iola eventually shifted about 1.5 miles (2.4 km) west of the old railroad terminus to the east side of the Chipola River at the southern end of the Dead Lakes (30.1488°N 85.1652°W). The area around the Dead Lakes attracted sports hunters and fishermen, who could travel there by steamboat on the Apalachicola River, landing at the old railroad terminus. By late in the 19th century, there were several hotels, boarding houses and fishing and hunting clubs in Iola. (Note: An 1892 brochure advertised the Lake View Hotel, 1.5 miles (2.4 km) from the steamboat landing at Iola, and 150 yards (140 m) from the Chipola Dead Lakes. The brochure praises the fishing, hunting, and scenery of the Dead Lakes. The author of a testimonial letter in the brochure speaks of spending the previous 20 winters at the Chipola Dead Lakes.) The town may have been busiest in the first quarter of the 20th century, with several livery stables, stores, and gristmills present. The Iola post office was again established on November 4, 1857, and except for a two-year gap in 1867 to 1869, remained open until April 26, 1926. Iola was not reported in the Federal Censuses between 1840 and 1890. The Iola voting precinct of Calhoun County had 119 residents in 1890, 236 in 1900, and 138 in 1910. The population of Iola was not reported in censuses after 1910.

Iola is now in Gulf County, which was separated from Calhoun County in 1925.

== Sources ==
- Bradbury, Alford G.; Hallock, E. Story (1962). A chronology of Florida post offices. Florida Federation of Stamp Clubs.
- Dodd, Dorothy (July 1945). "Florida in 1845: Statistics - Economic Life - Social Life". The Florida Historical Quarterly. 24 (1): 3–27. JSTOR 30138575.
- Ellsworth, Lucious F.; Dysart, Jane E. (1980). "West Florida's Forgotten People: The Creek Indians From 1830 until 1970". Florida Historical Quarterly. 59 (4): 1–22.
- Gilbert, J. T. (1892). In Paradise. A Trip to Chipola (Dead Lakes), Florida. Columbus, Georgia: Thomas Gilbert, Printer and Stationer.
- Hurst, Robert (January 15, 2017). "The Lost Town of Iola and Remnants of Florida's Pioneering Railroads". Panama City Living. Archived from the original on October 14, 2018.
- Jones, Herman (September 8, 2016). "Death's Angel: The 'Great Tide' of 1844". The (Port St. Joe) Star. Archived from the original on October 13, 2018.
- Kappler, Charles J., ed. (1904). "Indian Affairs: Laws and Treaties, Volume II: Treaties - Treaty with the Apalachicola Band, 1832". Archived from the original on April 25, 2007.
- Mount-Douds, Beverly (2015). Images of America: Wewahitchka. Charleston, South Carolina: Arcadia Publishing. ISBN 978-1-4671-1406-6.
- Paisley, Clifton (1989). The Red Hills of Florida: 1528–1865. The University of Alabama Press. ISBN 0-8173-0412-6.
- Stanaback, Richard J. (October 1973). "Postal Operations in Territorial Florida, 1821-1845". The Florida Historical Quarterly. 52 (2): 157–174. JSTOR 30149030.
- Turner, Gregg M. (2008). A Journey into Florida Railroad History. Gainesville, Florida: University Press of Florida. ISBN 978-0-8130-4149-0.
- White, Nancy Marie (2024). Apalachicola Valley Archaeology: The Late Woodland Period through Recent History: Volume 2. Tuscaloosa, Alabama: The University of Alabama Press. ISBN 978-0-8173-2181-9.
- Worth, John E. (2018). "The Yamasee in West Florida". In Bossy, Denise I. (ed.). The Yamasee Indians: From Florida to South Carolina. University of Nebraska Press. ISBN 978-1-4962-0760-9.
- Wright, J. Leitch Jr. (1986). Creeks and Seminoles (Paperback ed.). University of Nebraska Press. ISBN 0-8032-9728-9.
- Young, Hugh (October 1934). "A Topographical Memoir on East and West Florida with Itineraries of General Jackson's Army, 1818: Part I: The Memoir (Continued)". The Florida Historical Quarterly. 13 (2): 82–104. JSTOR 30150194.
- "Treaty of Moultrie Creek, 1823". Florida Memory - State Library and Archives of Florida.
