= Apalachicola band =

Group of Native American towns in Florida

The Apalachicola band consisted of several Native Americans towns, primarily speakers of the Muscogee language, living along the Apalachicola River in northern Florida in the early 19th century. The 1823 Treaty of Moultrie Creek assigned the Apalachicola band several small reservations along the Apalachicola River, separate from the main reservation created in central and southern Florida for the people collectively called Seminole. The Apalachicola band was allowed to stay on their reservations for only a decade, before being moved to the Indian Territory.

== Origins ==
Various towns which were or had been part of the Muscogee Confederacy moved into northern Florida in the late 18th and early 19th century. Some of those towns settled along the Apalachicola River. At the start of the First Seminole War in late 1817, Andrew Jackson led United States army and militia troops into Spanish Florida to attack Native American groups that had been raiding into the United States, and providing sanctuary to slaves who had run away from plantations in the United States. Captain Hugh Young, a topographical engineer serving under Jackson, wrote a report on the Native American towns in or near the part of Florida in which Jackson's army operated. He listed several towns along the Apalachicola River and the lowest reach of the Chattahoochee River, which he described as "Creeks", i.e., Muscogee language-speakers. The towns listed by Young included:

- Emusses, with 15 to 20 men under Emusse-mico and Ohuluckhija, living where the Chattahoochee and Flint rivers meet to form the Apalachicola River;
- Tamatles, with 25 men under chiefs Yellow Hair and Black King, living 7 miles (11 km) north of Ocheesee Bluff on the Apalachicola River;
- Ocheeses, with 25 men under chief Jack-mealy, living at Ocheesee Bluff, and;
- Ehawhohasles, with 15 to 20 men under chief Apiokhija, living 12 miles (19 km) below Ocheesee Bluff.

A Spanish map from the period shows the towns of Aldea de Tomathly (Tamatles), Aldea de Ochesees (Ocheeses), and Yawolla (Ehawhohasles) in the same order as Young's report. Tamasle, or Tamatles, was originally a Yamassee town, but had been at least partly assimilated into Muscogee culture and language by this time. Worth identifies Ehawhohasles or Yawolla with the town known as "Iola", with John Blount as its leader. (Note: John Blount (or Blunt), also known as Laufauka, was a Tukabatchee chief of mixed ancestry. He supported the United States in the Creek War and First Seminole War. His people settled along the Apalachicola River near Prospect Bluff after 1816, where they were called Lower Creeks, Seminoles, or Apalachicolas. Blount stated that his people were not Seminoles, but rather were Upper Creeks or Apalachicolas.) By end of the Second Spanish period these towns on the upper Apalachicola River had merged into the Apalachicola band. Yellow Hair had been the principal chief over five towns, but by the time the United States acquired Florida, he had been replaced by John Blunt. John Blunt, Yellow Hair, Mulatto King (Boyd equates Mulatto King with Young's Black King of Tamatles), and Neamathla, leader of a Mikasuki town east of the Apalachicola River, met with Andrew Jackson in 1821 to discuss their fate under American control.

Econchatimico ("Red Ground (town) King"), was the chief of a town on the Chattahoochee in Alabama in 1818, when a party led by William McIntosh attacked it. The town of Ekanachatti had been abandoned by 1821, with its people moving south along the Chattahoochee River, to a town called Tock-to-ethla (Totoawathla or Totowithla, "River Junction"), which was probably at a site later called Port Jackson, in the reservation later assigned to Econchatimico. The town had 38 men when the reservation was established. Another Muscogee town, led by Emathlochee, named Attapulgas, migrated into Florida late in the second Spanish period, settling in a town called Tophulga on Rocky Comfort Creek, near present-day Tallahassee, Florida.

== Apalachicola reservations ==
At the 1823 conference that resulted in the Treaty of Moultrie Creek, Neamathla, whose town was then located between Lake Miccosukee and Tallahassee, was chosen by the Seminoles and other peoples in Florida as their chief negotiator. The treaty established a main reservation in interior central and southern Florida, but let Neamathla's town and the Apalachicola band towns led by Mulatto King, Emathlochee, John Blunt and Tuski-Hajo, and Econchatomico remain on small reservations in the panhandle. Neamathla's and Emathlochee's people, however, were not then living on the reservation assigned to them in the treaty. Collectively, these reservations along the Apalachicola River were called the Northern Division of the Seminole Reservation, and the people who were living on them, or were to move to them, were called the "Apalachicola band".

Neamathla's people were assigned a reservation of 2 square miles (5.2 km^{2}) on Rocky Comfort Creek, the site of Emathloochee's Tophulga. The people led by John Blunt and Tuski Hadjo were assigned a reservation of 4 miles (6.4 km) along the Apalachicola, extending 2 miles (3.2 km) from the river. The people led by the Mulatto King (Vacapasacy) and Yellow Hair, were assigned a reservation of 4 miles (6.4 km) along the Apalachicola River, extending 1 mile (1.6 km) from the river. Emathlochee's people moved to this reservation, settling in a town named Attapulgus. Econchatimico's people were assigned a reservation of 4 miles (6.4 km) along the Florida side of the Chattahoochee River, extending 1 mile (1.6 km) from the river, above where that river joined the Flint River to form the Apalachicola River.

== Removal ==
Neamthla's Mikasukis never did move to their assigned reservation on Rocky Comfort Creek. Due to friction between Neamathla and the government, and to Neamathla's reservation being far removed from the main Seminole reservation, Neamathla was replaced as head chief of the reservation with John Hicks. Neamathla and his people soon moved to Alabama. The land reserved for Neamathla's people was surveyed and sold to white settlers in 1827.

The United States Congress passed the Indian Removal Act in 1830. Seminole chiefs on the main reservation in Florida were pressured or tricked into signing the Treaty of Payne's Landing in 1832, which called for their removal to west of the Mississippi River. The Apalachicola Band was not a party to that treaty.

Later in 1832, the United States negotiated a treaty with John Blunt and Davy, successor to Tuski Hadjo, for the people of Yawolla, or Iola, to give up their reservation in Florida and move west of the Mississippi. In 1833, the United States negotiated separate treaties with Mulatto King (Vacapasacy) and Tustenuggy Hajo, successor to Emathlochee, and with Econchatimico, for their people to also give up their reservations in Florida and move west of the Mississippi. Most of the Apalachicolas moved to Indian Territory soon after, although Econchatimico was still living at Port Jackson (on his former reservation) in 1838. In the late 1830s, Econchatimico lost a number of slaves due to fraudulent claims by a white planter and actions by slave stealers. Small bands of people in the Florida panhandle, called Creeks, Seminoles, or Apalachicolas, were captured in the late 1830s and also sent west to the Indian Territory. In 1839, 300 "Apalachicolas" were sent as a group from Pensacola west by steamer and schooners. The people of the Apalachicola band merged in Indian Territory with other Muscogee peoples and their descendants are enrolled in the federally recognized Muscogee Nation.

== Sources ==
- Boyd, Mark F. (1958). "Historic Sites in and adjacent to the Jim Woodruff Reservoir, Florida-Georgia". In Roberts, Frank H. H. (ed.). River Basin Surveys Papers (PDF). Bulletin 169. Smithsonian Institution Bureau of American Ethnology. pp. 195–314.
- Bullen, Ripley P. (April 15, 1950). "An archaeological survey of the Chattahoochee River Valley in Florida" (PDF). Journal of the Washington Academy of Sciences. 40 (4): 101–125. JSTOR 24531334.
- Covington, James W. (1963). "Federal Relations with the Apalachicola Indians, 1823–1838". The Florida Historical Quarterly. 42 (2): 125–141 – via STARS, University of Central Florida Library.
- Covington, James W. (1993). The Seminoles of Florida. University Press of Florida. ISBN 978-0-8130-1196-7.
- Paisley, Clifton (1989). The Red Hills of Florida: 1528–1865. The University of Alabama Press. ISBN 0-8173-0412-6.
- Worth, John E. (2018). "The Yamasee in West Florida". In Bossy, Denise I. (ed.). The Yamasee Indians: From Florida to South Carolina. University of Nebraska Press. ISBN 978-1-4962-0760-9.
- Wright, J. Leitch Jr. (1986). Creeks and Seminoles (Paperback ed.). University of Nebraska Press. ISBN 0-8032-9728-9.
- Young, Hugh (October 1934). "A Topographical Memoir on East and West Florida with Itineraries of General Jackson's Army, 1818: Part I: The Memoir (Continued)". The Florida Historical Quarterly. 13 (2): 82–104. JSTOR 30150194.
- "Treaty of Moultrie Creek, 1823". Florida Memory - State Library and Archives of Florida.
- Kappler, Charles J., ed. (1904). "Indian Affairs: Laws and Treaties, Volume II: Treaties - Treaty with the Apalachicola Band, 1832". Archived from the original on April 25, 2007.
- Kappler, Charles J., ed. (1904). "Indian Affairs: Laws and Treaties, Volume II: Treaties - Treaty with the Apalachicola Band, 1833". Archived from the original on July 11, 2007.
