= Treaty of Payne's Landing =

1832 treaty between the United States and Seminole

The Treaty of Payne's Landing (Treaty with the Seminole, 1832) was an agreement signed on 9 May 1832 between the government of the United States and several chiefs of the Seminole Indians in the Territory of Florida, before it acquired statehood.

== Background ==
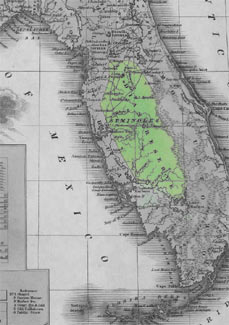
A contemporary map of the reservation assigned to the Seminole Indians in the Treaty of Moultrie Creek

By the Treaty of Moultrie Creek in 1823, the Seminoles had relinquished all claims to land in the Florida Territory in return for a reservation in the center of the Florida peninsula and certain payments, supplies and services to be provided by the U.S. government, guaranteed for twenty years. After the election of Andrew Jackson as President of the United States in 1828, the movement to transfer all Indians in the United States to west of the Mississippi River grew, and in 1830 the United States Congress passed the Indian Removal Act.

Determined to move the Seminoles west, the United States Department of War appointed James Gadsden to negotiate a new treaty with them. In the spring of 1832 the Seminoles on the reservation were called to a meeting at Payne's Landing on the Oklawaha River. The negotiations were conducted in obscurity, if not secrecy. No minutes were taken, nor were any detailed accounts of the negotiations ever published. This was to lead to trouble later.

The U.S. government wanted the Seminoles to move to the Creek Reservation in what was then part of the Arkansas Territory (which later became part of the Indian Territory), to become part of the Creek Nation, and to return all runaway slaves (maroons) to their lawful owners. None of these demands were agreeable to the Seminoles. They had heard that the climate at the Creek Reservation was harsher than in Florida. The Seminoles of Florida did not consider themselves part of the Creeks. Although many of the groups in Florida had come from what whites called Creek tribes, they did not feel any connection. Some of the groups in Florida, such as the Choctaw, Yamasees, and the Yuchis had never been grouped with the Creeks. Finally, runaway slaves, while often held as slaves by the Seminoles (under much milder conditions than with whites), were fairly well integrated into the bands, often inter-marrying, and rising to positions of influence and leadership.

== Treaty contents ==
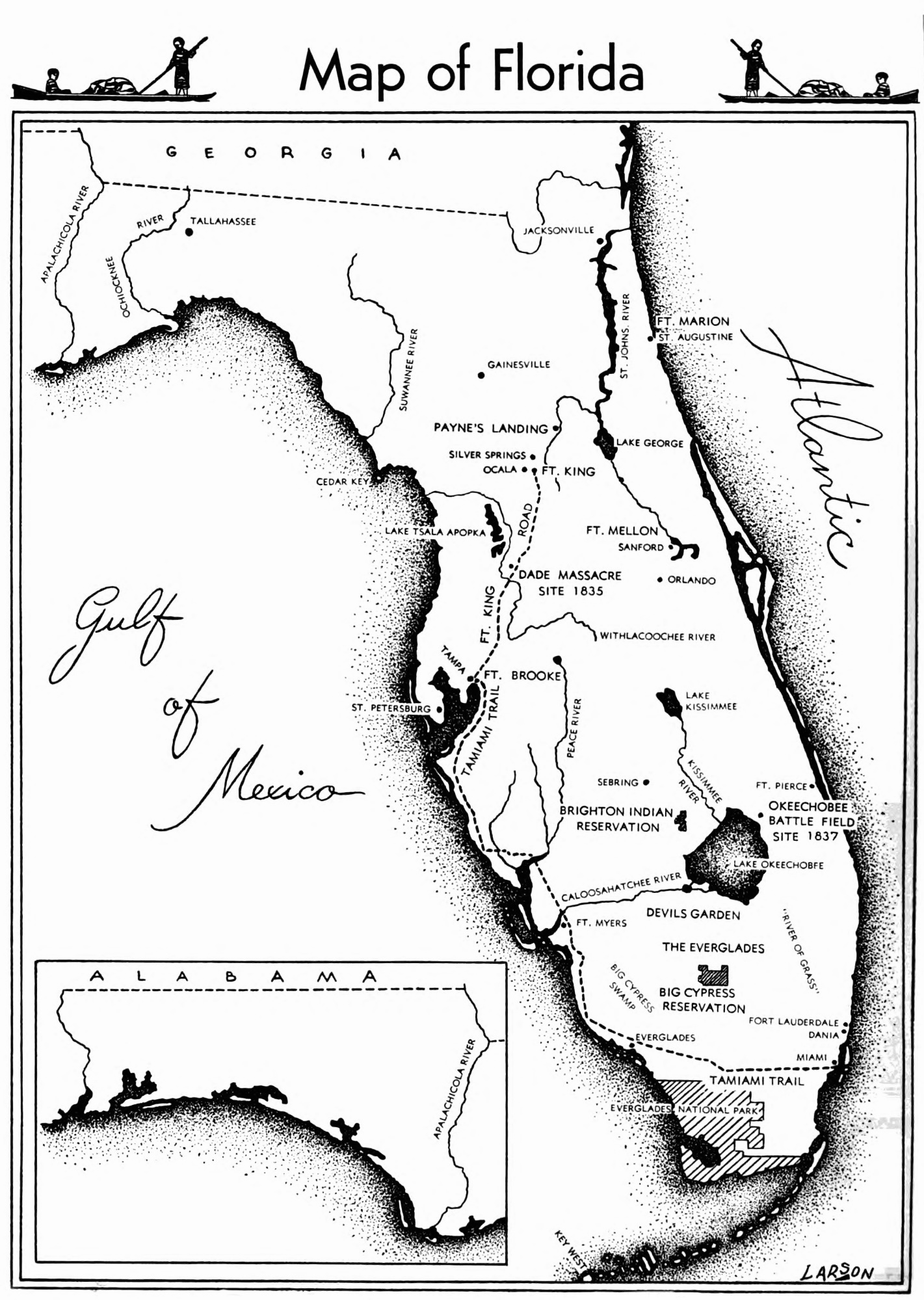
Map of Florida from Irvin Peithmann's The Unconquered Seminole Indians, artwork by Erland Larson

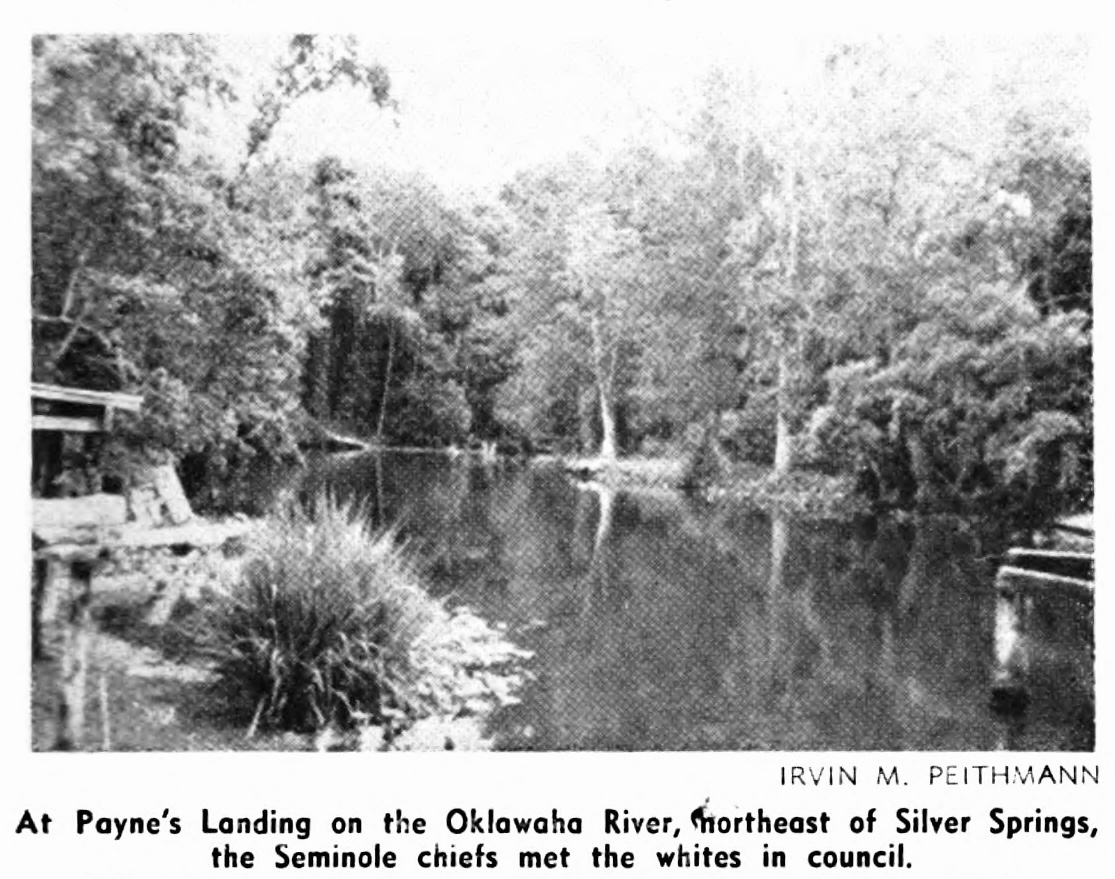
Payne's Landing, c. 1956

The treaty negotiated at Payne's Landing called for the Seminoles to move west if the land were found to be suitable. The delegation of seven chiefs who were to inspect the new reservation did not leave Florida until October 1832. After touring the area for several months and conferring with the Creeks who had already been settled there, the seven chiefs signed on March 28, 1833 at Fort Gibson, Arkansas Territory a statement (also referred to as the Treaty of Fort Gibson) that the new land was acceptable. Upon their return to Florida, however, most of the chiefs renounced the statement, claiming that they had not signed it, or that they had been forced to sign it, and in any case, that they did not have the power to decide for all the tribes and bands that resided on the reservation. Even some U.S. Army officers observed that the chiefs "had been wheedled and bullied into signing." Furthermore, "there is evidence of trickery by the whites in the way the treaty is phrased." Maj. Ethan Allen Hitchcock recorded in his journal, "The treaty of Payne's Landing in 1832 by which it was attempted to remove the Indians, was a fraud upon them and they have in fact never agreed to emigrate. I say therefore that the Indians are in the right to defend themselves in the country to the best of their ability."

Several villages had been allowed to stay in the area of the Apalachicola River after 1823 when the rest of the Seminoles had been forced into the new reservation. Gadsden was able to persuade the chiefs of these villages to move, however, and they went west in 1834. The United States Senate finally ratified the Treaty of Payne's Landing in April 1834.

== Refusal to move ==
The treaty had given the Seminoles three years to move west of the Mississippi River. The government interpreted the three years as starting in 1832, and expected the Seminoles to move in 1835. Fort King, in what is now Ocala was reopened in 1834. A new Seminole agent, Wiley Thompson, was appointed in 1834, and the task of persuading the Seminoles to move fell to him. He called the chiefs together at Fort King in October 1834 to talk to them about the removal to the west. The Seminoles informed Thompson that they had no intention of moving, and that they did not feel bound by the Treaty of Payne's Landing. Thompson then requested reinforcements for Fort King and Fort Brooke, reporting that, "the Indians after they had received the Annuity, purchased an unusually large quantity of Powder & Lead." Brigadier General Duncan L. Clinch, United States Army commander for Florida, also warned Washington that the Seminoles did not intend to move, and that more troops would be needed to force them to move. In March 1835 Thompson called the chiefs together to read a letter from Andrew Jackson to them. In his letter, Jackson said, "Should you ... refuse to move, I have then directed the Commanding officer to remove you by force." The chiefs asked for thirty days to respond. A month later the Seminole chiefs told Thompson that they would not move west. Thompson and the chiefs began arguing, and General Clinch had to intervene to prevent bloodshed. Eventually, eight of the chiefs agreed to move west, but asked to delay the move until the end of the year, and Thompson and Clinch agreed.

Five of the most important of the Seminole chiefs, including Micanopy of the Alachua Seminoles, had not agreed to the move. In retaliation, Thompson declared that those chiefs were removed from their positions. As relations with the Seminoles deteriorated, Thompson forbid the sale of guns and ammunition to the Seminoles. Osceola, a young warrior beginning to be noticed by the whites, was particularly upset by the ban, feeling that it equated Seminoles with slaves and said, "The white man shall not make me black. I will make the white man red with blood; and then blacken him in the sun and rain ... and the buzzard live upon his flesh." In spite of this, Thompson considered Osceola to be a friend, and gave him a rifle. Later, though, when Osceola was causing trouble, Thompson had him locked up at Fort King for a night. The next day, in order to secure his release, Osceola agreed to abide by the Treaty of Payne's Landing and to bring his followers in.

In August 1835 Private Kinsley Dalton (for whom Dalton, Georgia is named) was killed by Seminoles as he was carrying the mail from Fort Brooke to Fort King. In November, Chief Charley Emathla, wanting no part of a war, led his people towards Fort Brooke where they were to board ships to go west. This was considered a betrayal by other Seminoles. Osceola met Emathla on the Fort King trail and killed him. The next month the Second Seminole War would begin with the Dade massacre. On the same day as the Dade Massacre, Osceola and his followers shot and killed Wiley Thompson and six others outside of Fort King.

== Signatories ==
- James Gadsden
- Holati Emartla, his x mark
- Jumper, his x mark
- Fuch-ta-lus-ta-Hadjo, his x mark
- Charley Emartla, his x mark
- Coa Hadjo, his x mark
- Ar-pi-uck-i, or Sam Jones, his x mark
- Ya-ha Hadjo, his x mark
- Mico-Noha, his x mark
- Tokose-Emartla, or Jno. Hicks. his x mark
- Cat-sha-Tusta-nuck-i, his x mark
- Hola-at-a-Mico, his x mark (aka Billy Bowlegs)
- Hitch-it-i-Mico, his x mark
- E-ne-hah, his x mark
- Ya- ha- emartla Chup- ko, his mark
- Moke-his-she-lar-ni, his x mark

Witnesses:

- Douglas Vass, Secretary to Commissioner,
- John Phagan, Agent,
- Stephen Richards, Interpreter,
- Abraham, Interpreter, his x mark,
- Cudjo, Interpreter, his x mark,
- Erastus Rogers,
- B. Joscan.
