= Thomas Lawson (military physician) =

Surgeon General of the United States Army

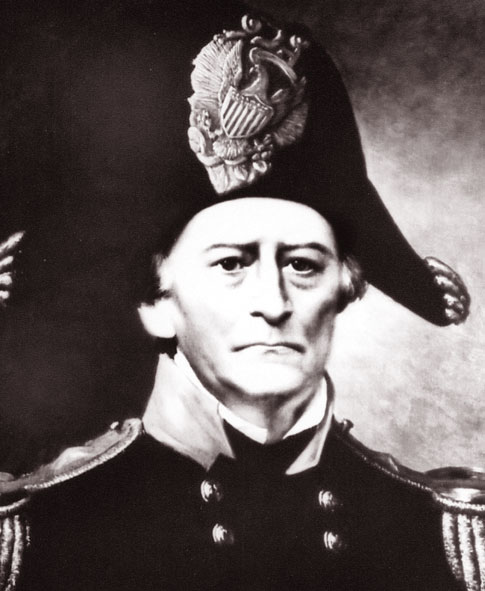
Bvt. Brig. Gen. Thomas Lawson

Thomas Lawson (August 29, 1789 – May 15, 1861) was an American medical doctor who served as Surgeon General of the United States Army for over 24 years.

== Biography ==
Lawson was born in Princess Anne County, Virginia in 1789. Nothing is known about his early education or medical education, but it is assumed that he trained under local physicians. He entered the United States Navy as a surgeon's mate in March 1809. He resigned two years later to be appointed as a garrison surgeon's mate in the army. Lawson served during the War of 1812 as he was promoted to be the regimental surgeon for the 6th Infantry on May 21, 1813. In May 1815, he became the surgeon for the 7th Infantry, and appeared as a senior officer of surgeons until he was promoted to Surgeon General in October 1836. During his time with the 6th Infantry, he was President of a board of medical examiners in charge of giving troops entrance and promotion health examinations. With troops concentrated around his garrison for the Seminole War, he was appointed the medical director of Fort Mitchell, Alabama.

In 1836, Surgeon General Joseph Lovell died. A movement to promote a civilian doctor to the post was opposed by the army, which was in full support of Lawson. He was appointed on November 30, 1836, by President Jackson. After the Seminole War, there were few activities needing the attention of the Surgeon General, but Lawson worked to create many changes within the medical department of the military. Improvements included an increase in numbers, new uniforms, military rank and increased pay. During the Mexican–American War, Lawson accompanied General Winfield Scott from Vera Cruz to Mexico City as a medical advisor. The first three volumes of Army Medical Statistics were published during Lawson's tenure. Lawson received a brevet promotion to brigadier general in May 1848. Lawson also worked to grant military rank to surgeons, resulting in the passage of an 1847 act to this effect.

At the start of the American Civil War, Lawson was 72 and in poor health. The medical staff for the Union Army consisted of 30 surgeons, 83 assistant surgeons, and the office of the Surgeon General itself. On May 15, 1861, he was stricken with apoplexy and died in Norfolk, Virginia.
