= Charlton W. Tebeau =

American historian (1904–2000)

Charlton W. Tebeau (1904–2000) was an American historian and author who specialized in the history of Florida. He was a professor of history at the University of Miami and chaired its department of history.

Born in Springfield, Georgia, Tebeau earned a bachelor's degree from The University of Tennessee at Chattanooga, and master's and doctoral degrees from The State University of Iowa. He took a teaching job at the University of Miami in 1939, where he remained for 37 years, ultimately serving as chairman of its History Department for 23 years.

Tebeau helped start the Historical Museum of Southern Florida in Miami and served as editor of its annual historical journal, Tequesta, for 40 years.

Tebeau wrote many books on the history of Florida. Best known is A History of Florida, which was published in 1971 by University of Miami Press. This was the most comprehensive history of Florida published to that time, and became a standard textbook. Described as "among the greatest achievements in the field of Florida historiography", it is now in its third edition. Esquire magazine named Tebeau a super-prof in 1966.

The Charlton W. Tebeau Chair in American History was established at the University of Miami in Tebeau's honor. There are currently two Tebeau Chairs of history: Michael Bernath (Tebeau Assistant Professor) and Robin F. Bachin (Tebeau Associate Professor). The Florida Historical Association also annually awards the "Charlton Tebeau Book Award" for the publication of a general interest book on Florida history.

== Books ==
- 1934. The Planter in the Lower South, 1865-1880. Iowa City: The University. OCLC: 47687820
- 1955. The Story of the Chokoloskee Bay Country: with the reminiscences of pioneer C.S. "Ted" Smallwood. Coral Gables, Florida: University of Miami Press. OCLC: 1513779
- 1963. They Lived in the Park; the story of man in the Everglades National Park. Coral Gables Florida: Everglades Natural History Association. OCLC: 1535965
- 1964. Values shaping Southern thought: an address. Whitewater, Wisconsin: Wisconsin State University. OCLC: 52863144
- 1965. With Ruby Leach Carson. Florida from Indian trail to space age: a history. Delray Beach, Florida: Southern Publishing Company. OCLC: 1414052
- 1966. Florida's last frontier; the history of Collier County. Coral Gables, Florida: University of Miami Press. OCLC: 485484
- 1968. Man in the Everglades; 2,000 years of human history in the Everglades National Park. Coral Gables, Florida: University of Miami Press. OCLC: 440131 (2nd edition of They Lived in the Park)
- 1971. A History of Florida. Coral Gables, Florida: University of Miami Press. ISBN 0-87024-149-4
- 1972. Synagogue in the central city: Temple Israel of Greater Miami, 1922-1972. Coral Gables, Florida: University of Miami Press. ISBN 0-87024-239-3
- 1973. Past environment from historical sources. United States National Park Service, South Florida Environmental Project. Reproduced and distributed by National Technical Information Service, United States Department of Commerce. OCLC: 2292042
- 1976. The University of Miami : a golden anniversary history, 1926-1976. Coral Gables, Florida: University of Miami Press. ISBN 0-87024-297-0
