= William C. Sturtevant =

American anthropologist (1926–2007)

- Born: July 26, 1926; Morristown, New Jersey
- Died: March 2, 2007 (aged 80); Rockville, Maryland
- Title: Curator emeritus
- Spouse: Theda Maw (m. 1952; div. 1986) Sally McLendon (m. 1990, death)
- Father: Alfred Sturtevant

Academic background
- Education: Yale University
- Thesis: The Mikasuki Seminole: Medical Beliefs and Practices

Academic work
- Discipline: anthropology, ethnology
- Notable works: Handbook of North American Indians

William Curtis Sturtevant (July 26, 1926 Morristown, New Jersey – March 2, 2007 Rockville, Maryland) was an anthropologist and ethnologist. He is best known as the general editor of the 20-volume Handbook of North American Indians. Anthropologist Claude Lévi-Strauss described the work as "an absolutely indispensable tool that should be found on the shelves of all libraries, public and private alike."

Sturtevant's career focused on Native American languages and cultures. He was particularly known for his work on the history and culture of the Florida Seminole. During his career, he served as the president for the American Society for Ethnohistory, the American Ethnological Society, and the American Anthropological Association.

== Life ==
He graduated from the University of California, Berkeley in 1949, and from Yale University with a Ph.D. in 1955, where he was a student of Floyd Lounsbury. He served first as a research anthropologist for the Bureau of American Ethnology before being appointed Curator of North American Ethnology in the U.S. National Museum (later the National Museum of Natural History), Smithsonian Institution.

Sturtevant argued for the importance of material culture in anthropology, particularly in incorporating the contents of museum collections. A list of his published and unpublished work is available at the National Anthropological Archives of the Smithsonian Institution.

== Family ==
He was the eldest son of the geneticist Alfred Sturtevant and brother of Harriet S. Shapiro. He was married to Theda Maw, daughter of Ba Maw, from 1952 to 1986; they had three children. Sturtevant remarried in 1990, to linguist Sally McLendon. Sturtevant died on March 2, 2007, from emphysema.
