= Treaty of Moultrie Creek =

1823 treaty between the US government and Native Americans in Florida

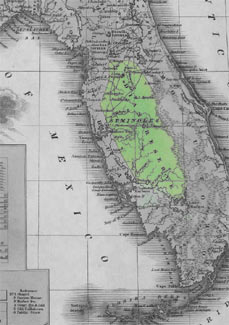
- The Treaty of Moultrie Creek, also known as The Treaty with the Florida Indian Tribes, established a reservation in central Florida for Native Americans. It also ceded the coastal land of Florida to the United States government as the U.S. could now control coastal trade between Florida and the Caribbean.
- Signed: September 18, 1823
- Location: Moultrie Creek (Note: Moultrie Creek is south of St. Augustine in St. Johns County, Florida)
- Negotiators: United States and various bands of Native Americans

The Treaty of Moultrie Creek, also known as the Treaty with the Florida Tribes of Indians, was an agreement signed in 1823 between the government of the United States and the chiefs of several groups and bands of Native Americans living in the present-day state of Florida. The treaty established a reservation in the center of the Florida peninsula, to which most of the Native Americans in Florida were to move, although several bands in western Florida were given small reservations around their settlements. The treaty allowed the Native Americans to remain in Florida for twenty years, and specified support to be given by the United States government to the reservation resident. The government waited less than ten years before forcing the Treaty of Payne's Landing on the Native Americans in Florida, requiring them to move west of the Mississippi River. Many of the Native Americans resisted removal from Florida, leading to the Second Seminole War.

== Background ==
The indigenous peoples of Florida had largely died out by the early 18th century. (Note: The Apalachee, Timucua, and Yustaga of the Spanish mission system in northern Florida were largely killed or carried off to the Province of Carolina by 1706. After the destruction of the Spanish mission system in northern Florida, Yamasees and Muskogean-speakers (called "Creek Indians" by the English, "Uchises" by the Spanish) raided far into the Florida peninsula, killing many of the Florida natives, and capturing others for sale as slaves. Most of the surviving Calusa people retreated to the Florida Keys between 1704 and 1711.) Various groups and bands of Muskogean-speakers (called Creek Indians by the British (Note: The English called the people of the Muscogee Confederacy "Creeks". The use of the term "Creek Indians", which includes Muscogees and other peoples, is often offensive to the descendants of those people.)), Yamasees and Yuchis moved into the area, often with the encouragement of the Spanish colonial government. These groups, which often lived on both sides of the border between Florida and Georgia, came into increasing conflict with white settlers after the United States became independent. When the United States acquired Florida from Spain in 1821 (by means of the Adams-Onís Treaty), the conflict increased. The prospect of Andrew Jackson returning with another army hovered over the scene, and from Tennessee he wrote the federal government with unsolicited advice on the matter (use troops from the Fourth U.S. Infantry Regiment at Pensacola to intimidate the Native Americans).

In 1823, the United States government decided to settle the Native Americans in Florida on a reservation in the central part of the territory. A meeting to negotiate a treaty was scheduled for early September 1823 at Moultrie Creek, south of St. Augustine. About 425 Native Americans attended the meeting, choosing Neamathla, a prominent Mikasuki chief, to be their chief representative. Under the terms of the treaty negotiated there, the Native Americans were forced to place themselves under the protection of the United States and to give up all claim to lands in Florida, in exchange for a reservation of about four million acres (16,000 km²).

== Treaty ==
The reservation ran down the middle of the Florida peninsula from just north of present-day Ocala to a line even with the southern end of Tampa Bay. The boundaries were well inland from both coasts, to prevent contact with Spanish and British traders from Cuba and the Bahamas. Neamathla and five other chiefs (of the Apalachicola band), however, were allowed to keep their villages along the Apalachicola River.

Under the Treaty of Moultrie Creek, the United States government was obligated to protect the Seminoles as long as they remained peaceful and law-abiding. The government was supposed to distribute $6000 worth of farm implements, cattle and hogs to the Seminoles, compensate them for travel and losses involved in relocating to the reservation, and provide rations for a year, until the Seminoles could plant and harvest new crops. The government was also supposed to pay the tribe $5,000 a year for twenty years, and provide an interpreter, a school and a blacksmith for the same twenty years. No white person was allowed to settle, farm, or hunt the reservation land as well. In turn, the Seminoles had to allow roads to be built across the reservation and had to apprehend any runaway slaves or other fugitives and return them to United States jurisdiction.

== Implementation ==
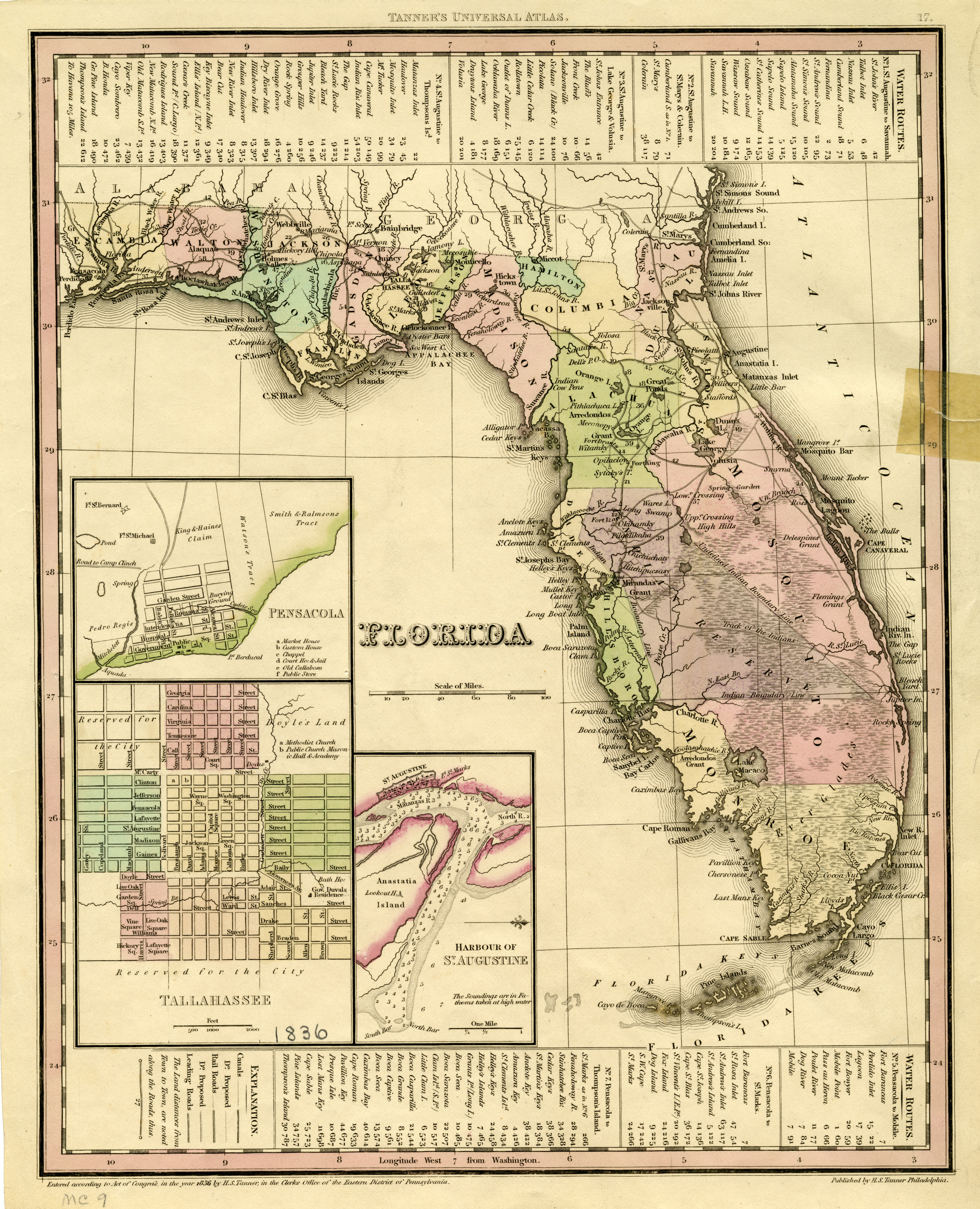
Henry S. Tanner's 1833 map of Florida showing the reservation

The Seminoles were slow to move onto the new reservation. After bands living between the Suwannee and Apalachicola Rivers resisted moving to the reservation, Florida governor William Pope Duval replace Neamathla as chief representative of the Florida Native Americans with Tuckmose Emathla (called "John Hicks" by whites). Even with many bands refusing to move to the reservation, funding from the U.S. government was not adequate for feeding the Native Americans who had moved to the reservation. The Native Americans soon insisted that the reservation was not large enough to support them, an opinion with which Governor Duval and Indian Agent Gad Humphreys concurred. A severe drought in 1825 caused food shortages for the Native Americans, and it was reported that some had starved to death. Some Native Americans hunted outside the reservation, killing cattle that belonged to whites. Others left the reservation altogether, even moving to west of the Suwannee River. Continuing shortages led Governor Duval in 1827 and 1828 to permit the Native Americans to leave the reservation to fish along the Gulf coast, despite worries that the Native Americans were trading with Cubans at fishing ranchos on the coast.

The presence of blacks among the Native Americans, many of whom were slaves who had run away from white owners, was a continuing source of friction. While the Native Americans in Florida were supposed to help return run-away slaves to their owners, implementation was uneven. Governor Duval asked for clarification on whether slaves taken by the Native Americans during the War of 1812 were subject to being claimed by their former owners, and whether Native Americans were entitled to compensation for slaves bought at very low prices by traders who had told the Native Americans that the U.S. government was going to seize the slaves from them.

Governor Duval's efforts to feed the Native Americans resulted in expenditures exceeding appropriations. Thomas Loraine McKenney, United States Superintendent of Indian Affairs, ordered in 1827 that the overexpenditure be made up from the contingency fund, from which the salaries of officials connected to the reservation were paid, and the subagent, blacksmith, and interpreter all resigned whether than take a cut in pay. Late in the term of President John Quincy Adams, his administration decided that the Native Americans needed to be removed from Florida. President Andrew Jackson initially proposed that Native Americans be encouraged to move to west of the Mississippi. The Indian Removal Act of 1830 allowed the government to do whatever was necessary to remove Native Americans from east of the Mississippi. In 1832, James Gadsden was appointed special agent to negotiate with the Native Americans in Florida the terms of their removal to west of the Mississippi, resulting in the Treaty of Payne's Creek.

== See also ==
- Seminole Wars
- Treaty of Payne's Landing

== Sources ==
- Foster, H. Thomas II (2007). Archaeology of the Lower Muskogee Creek Indians, 1715–1836. The University of Alabama Press. ISBN 978-0-8173-1239-8.
- Mahon, John K. (1962). "The Treaty of Moultrie Creek, 1823". The Florida Historical Quarterly. 40 (4): 350–372. ISSN 0015-4113.
- Mahon, John K. (1985). History of the Second Seminole War 1835–1842 (Rev. ed.). Gainesville, Florida: University of Florida Press. ISBN 0-8130-1097-7.
- Missal, John; Missal, Mary Lou (2004). Seminole Wars: America's Longest Indian Conflict. Gainesville, Florida: University Press of Florida. ISBN 0-8130-2715-2.
