= Fort King =

- Fort King Site
- U.S. National Register of Historic Places
- U.S. National Historic Landmark
- Location within Florida Location within the United States
- Location: Ocala, Florida
- Coordinates: 29°11′20″N 82°04′56″W
- Built: 1827
- Architectural style: Fort
- NRHP reference No.: 04000320

Significant dates
- Added to NRHP: February 24, 2004
- Designated NHL: February 24, 2004

Fort King (also known as Camp King or Cantonment King) was a United States military fort in north central Florida, near what later developed as the city of Ocala. It was named after U.S. Army Colonel William King, commander of the 4th Infantry Regiment and the first American governor of the provisional West Florida region.

The fort was built by the U.S. Military in 1827 during tensions with the Seminole in Florida, a tribe of mostly Creek people who formed in the early nineteenth century. The fort was established originally to serve as a buffer between new settlers and the Seminole. It became an important base in the 1830s for the United States Army during the removal of the Seminole and the Seminole Wars. It later served as a courthouse in 1844 after the organization of Marion County, but was abandoned altogether, eventually. The residents took it apart in order to salvage building materials. The site of the fort is preserved as a National Historic Landmark near the corner of East Fort King Street and 39th Avenue in Ocala. The fort was reconstructed in order to be as historically accurate as possible in late 2017.

Archeological investigation has revealed the site was occupied during two lengthy periods by varying cultures of indigenous peoples, beginning as early as 6500 BC, more than 8,000 years ago.

== History ==
=== Prehistory ===
Archaeological investigations have revealed that the area was inhabited long before the arrival of the Spanish in the area. At least two periods of occupation have been identified: between 6500 and 2000 B.C., and 200 to 1500 A.D.

=== The fort ===
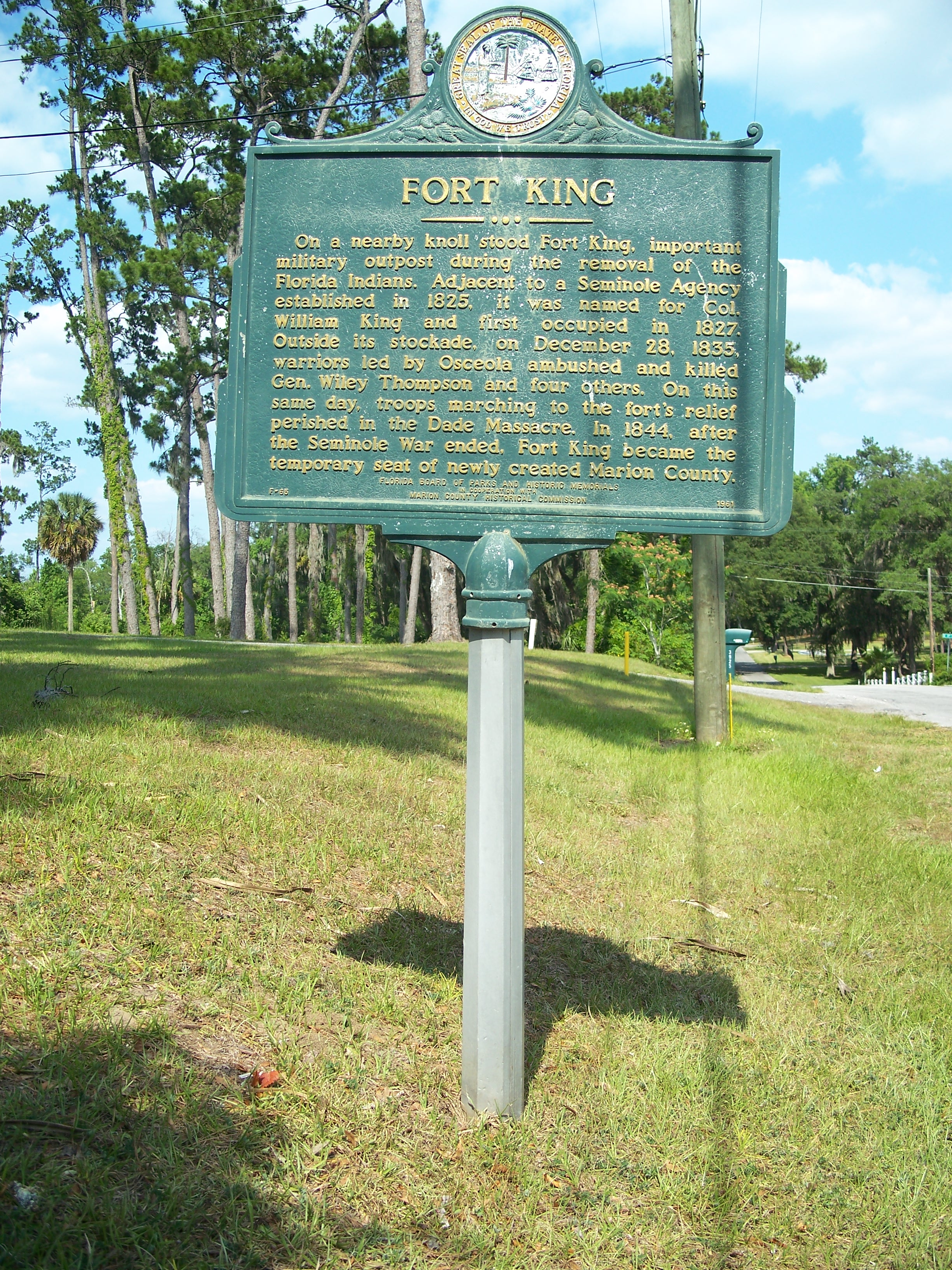
Historical marker at Fort King

Fort King was constructed by the United States Army in 1827 to serve as a buffer between the Seminole (who occupied territory to the south according to the Moultrie Creek Treaty reservation area) and European Americans settling north of this point. It was located at the nexus of a system of military roads. Fort King Road led from the fort to Fort Brooks (near Orange Springs); Fort McCoy; a ford at the St. Johns River which became the town of Astor; Palatka, Jacksonville, and Fort Brooke (on Tampa Bay), among others. The fort fell into disuse after 1829.

The fort was activated as a base for the United States removal of the Seminole to Indian Territory west of the Mississippi River, in 1832, as part of the Treaty of Payne's Landing. The Second Seminole War, beginning in late 1835 in central Florida, heightened the importance of the fort. It was a center of United States military activity during the next seven years, due to its strategic location. On December 23, 1835, a U.S. Army column led by Major Francis L. Dade departed from Fort Brooke (present-day Tampa), to reinforce and resupply the garrison at Fort King. Along the way, the column was ambushed by Seminole warriors in what is now known as the Dade Battle on December 28, 1835. On that same day a group of Seminole raiders assassinated U.S. official Wiley Thompson at Fort King. These two Seminole attacks marked the beginning of the Second Seminole War.

In July 1836 the Seminoles burned down Fort King after it was abandoned by the U.S. Army. However the U.S. Army later returned and rebuilt Fort King in April 1837. In May 1839 the Macomb Treaty, a peace treaty negotiated between U.S. Army General Alexander Macomb and the Seminole tribe, was created at Fort King. However this peace treaty would fall apart just two months later after the Battle of the Caloosahatchee. The fort was used in 1844 as the first county courthouse after the organization of Marion County. The building was abandoned eventually. Early settlers thoroughly took apart the fort to salvage building materials.

=== 20th century to today ===
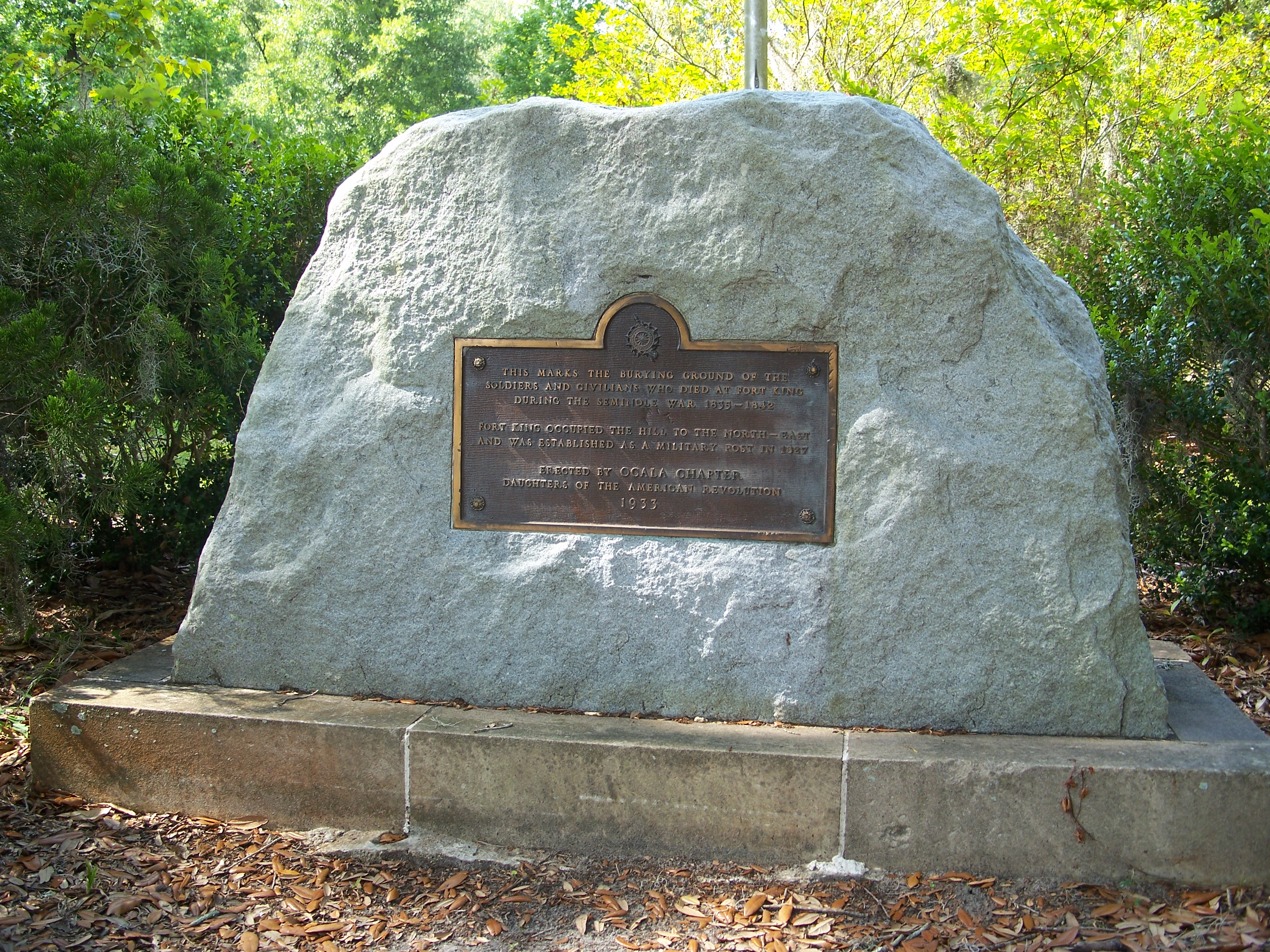
Historical marker for fort's cemetery

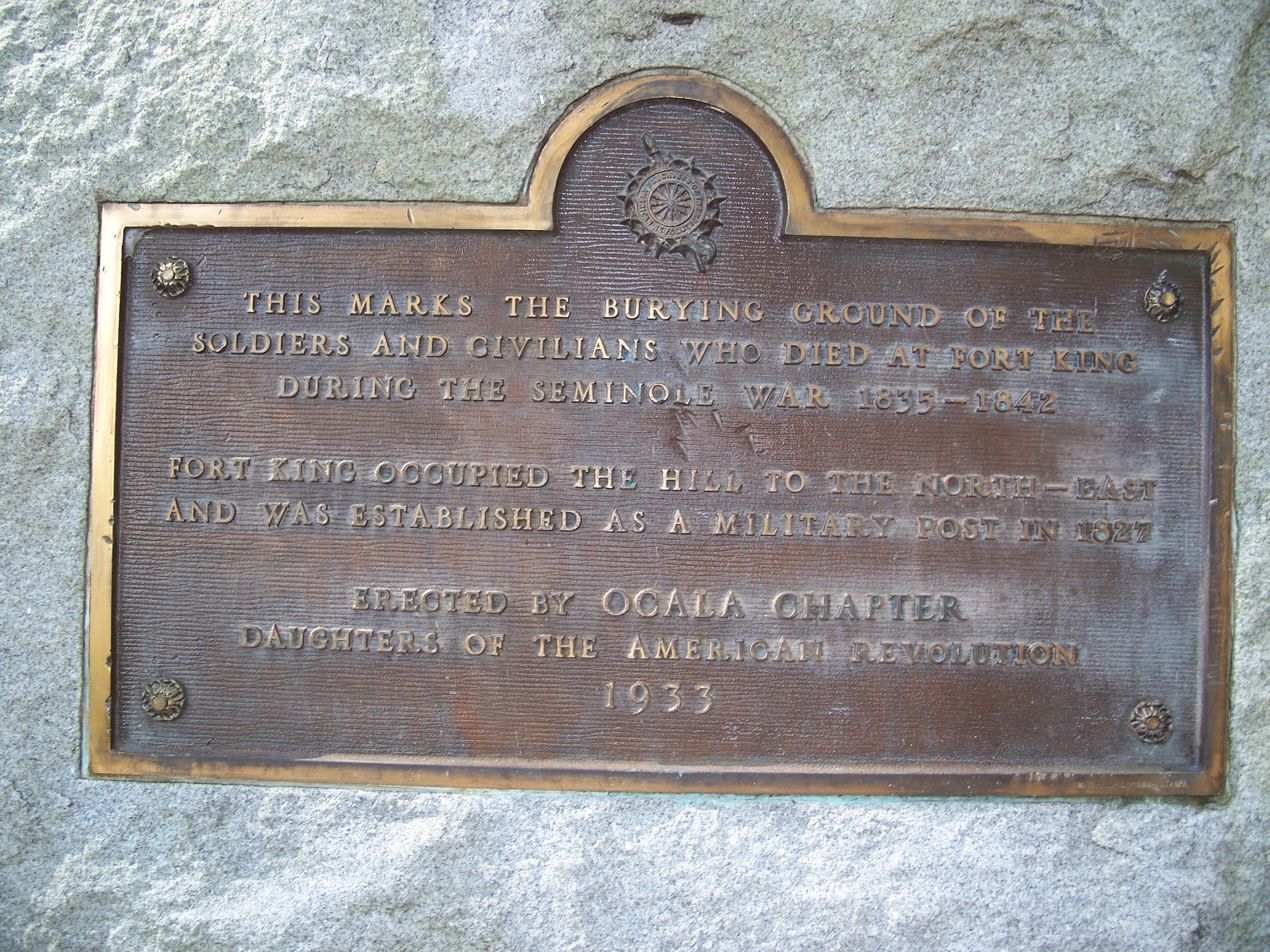
Closer view of plaque

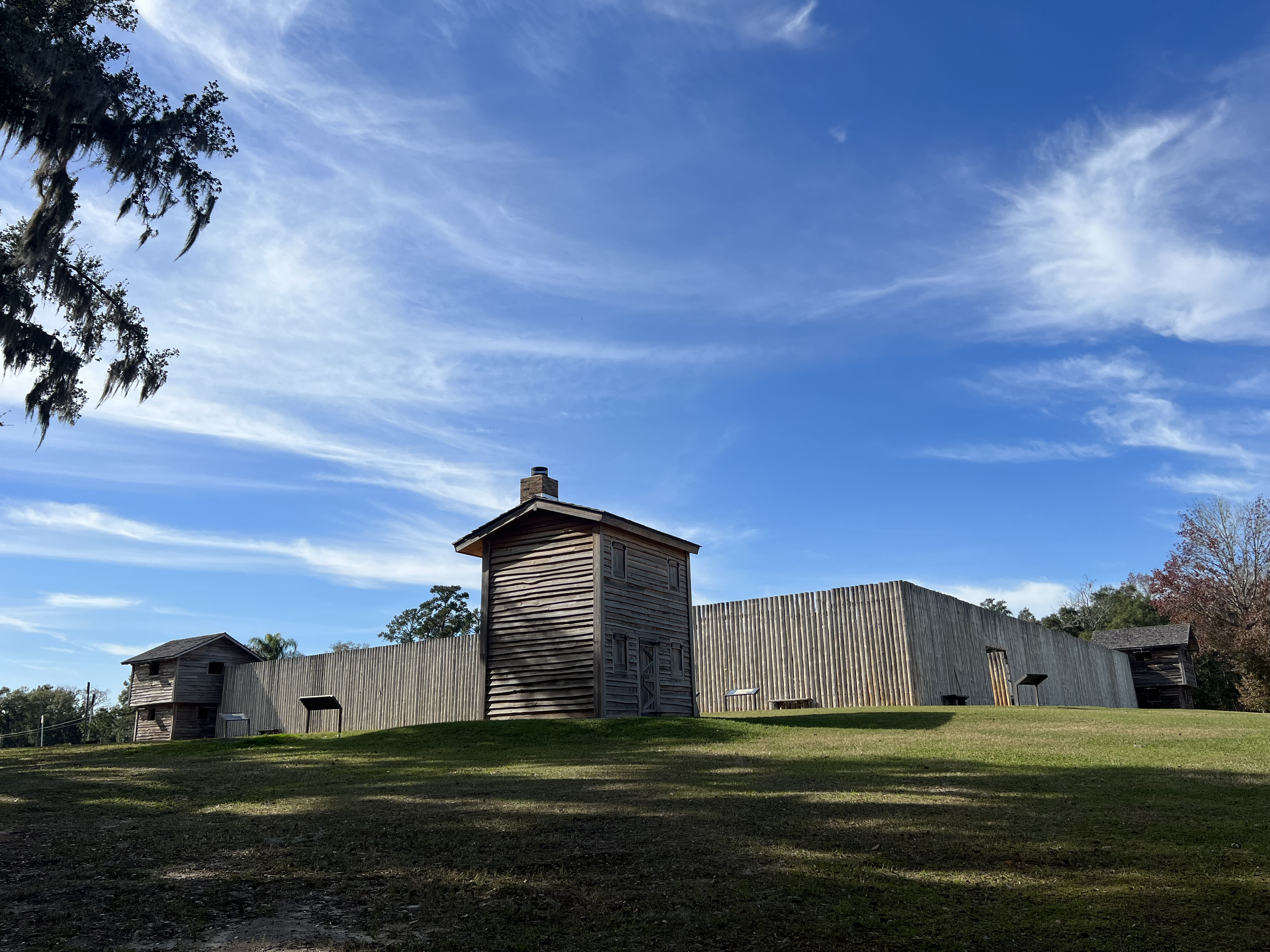
The Fort King reconstructed fortress in Ocala Florida

In October 1927, the founding members of the Ocala Chapter National Society Daughters of the American Revolution purchased the fort's memorial property, vowing to promote and protect its history for future generations. They raised the funds to erect a granite monument on the property to honor the men who bravely served our state and country here. On August 26, 2017, the Ocala Chapter National Society Daughters of the American Revolution continued the tradition by hosting a remembrance and dedication ceremony at the Fort King property and a granite bench was dedicated.

The 1953 movie Seminole is set around Fort King, although the events portrayed are historically inaccurate. In 2013 the Fort King Heritage Association was formed to develop, promote and protect the site. In the fall of 2017 a replica of the fort was reconstructed on the original site; the site is 37 acres of undeveloped, vacant land in the middle of a residential area. The site is owned by the City of Ocala and Marion County. Three historical markers commemorate the site: a Memorial Marker near the Fort Site, a National Historic Landmark near the former location of the fort (it was designated in February 2004), and a marker at the old Fort Cemetery Site. In December 2022, the Festival of Fort King, which includes living history events, returned to the park.
