= Wiley Thompson =

American politician

Superintendent of Seminole Removal
- In office July 8, 1834 – December 28, 1835

Member of the United States House of Representatives from Georgia
- In office March 4, 1821 – March 3, 1833

Member of the Georgia State Senate
- In office 1817–1819

Personal details
- Born: September 23, 1781 Amelia County, Virginia, United States
- Died: December 28, 1835 (aged 54) Fort King, Florida, United States
- Resting place: Elberton, Georgia, United States
- Party: Democratic
- Spouse: Elizabeth Thompson

Military service
- Allegiance: United States
- Branch/service: Georgia Militia
- Years of service: 1812-1824
- Rank: Major General
- Battles/wars: War of 1812; Red Stick War; Second Seminole War †

Wiley Thompson (September 23, 1781 – December 28, 1835) was a United States representative from Georgia.

Born in Amelia County, Virginia, Thompson moved to Elberton, Georgia, and served as a commissioner of the Elbert County Academy in 1808. He served in the Georgia Senate from 1817 to 1819 and was appointed Major General of the Fourth Division of the Georgia Militia in November 1817, a position in which he served until his resignation in November 1824.

Thompson was elected as a Democratic-Republican to the 17th United States Congress and reelected as a Crawford Republican to the 18th Congress. Thompson was then elected as a Jacksonian to the 19th and three successive Congresses (20th, 21st and 22nd). His congressional tenure spanned from March 4, 1821, through March 3, 1833.

After his congressional service, Thompson served as a delegate to the State constitutional convention in 1833. He became an Indian agent to the Seminoles and was appointed in 1834 to superintend the removal of the Seminoles from Florida. This episode of his life was artistically described by Thomas Mayne Reid in the 1858 novel Osceola. Thompson was subsequently killed by a band of Seminoles led by Osceola at Fort King, Florida, on December 28, 1835, and was buried on his estate in Elberton.

== Notes ==
U.S. House of Representatives
Preceded by William Terrell	Member of the U.S. House of Representatives from Georgia's at-large congressional district March 4, 1821 – March 3, 1827	Succeeded by Representatives elected by district
Preceded by Representatives elected At-Large	Member of the U.S. House of Representatives from Georgia's 3rd congressional district March 4, 1827 – March 3, 1829	Succeeded by Representatives elected At-Large
Preceded by Representatives elected by district	Member of the U.S. House of Representatives from Georgia's at-large congressional district March 4, 1829 – March 3, 1833	Succeeded by Roger Lawson Gamble
