= Halpatter Tustenuggee =

Seminole warchief

Halpatter Tustenuggee (Creek: Hvlpvtv Tvstvnvke, transl. "Alligator Warrior"), also known as "Alligator" and "Chief Alligator", was born around 1795? in the Muscogee-Creek country of the current states of Alabama and Georgia; reportedly of Eufaula Creek lineage, he came to Spanish Florida following the Creek War in 1814.

The town of Lake City, Florida, is associated with Halapatter Tustenuggee either because the original Native American settlement called "Halpatter Talofa" (also spelled "Alapata Telophka") which means "Alligator Town" in English, and was named after him or he was named after the aboriginal village. Tustenuggee was the title of the war chief of a tribal town of the Muscogee (Creek), Mikasuki, and Seminole people. Several of the leaders of those people during the Second Seminole War were commonly known by that title.

== Second Seminole War ==
Halpatter Tustenuggee was around 40 years old when the Second Seminole War started; it is not clear if or where he participated in the First Seminole War although he would have been of war-fighting age at that time. He was involved with the Treaty of Payne's Landing in 1832, and went west to tour Indian Territory with the delegation that resulted in the Treaty of Fort Gibson.

Halpatter Tustenuggee "Alligator" was one of the chiefs whom Indian Agent Wiley Thompson tried to have removed as leaders of their people when they refused to agree to removal in April 1835, following the Indian Removal Act of 1830; others opposing removal were Micanopy, Ote Emathla (Jumper), Abiaka (Sam Jones), and Black Dirt. He had major roles in the Dade Massacre, the Battle of Withlacoochee and again at the siege of Camp Izard. Also, he was one of the main leaders at the Battle of Okeechobee.

According to the account from Second Seminole War veteran John T. Sprague, "Alligator had been the most daring and resolute chief in instigating the first blows struck at the whites, at the commencement of the contest. He led the attack, and fired the first rifle after Micanopy, upon the command of Major Dade. At Okeechobee he was the most prominent chief, and the cause of the Indians making a stand to meet the troops."

Halpatter Tustenuggee surrendered at Fort Brooke in October 1841 and went to Indian Territory. He resided there a few months until he was brought back to Florida by Colonel William Jenkins Worth to help negotiate a surrender of the remnant bands still in Florida.

In 1842, a war party under another leader named Halpatter Tustenuggee (identified as Creek) and Cotzar Fixico Chopco (identified as a Mikasuki) shot and killed Waxe Hadjo and a cousin of Tiger Tail, who had travelled back from Indian Territory and were negotiating surrender with a band of Creeks at the Suwannee river near Fort Fanning. This second Halpatter Tustenuggee, who is associated with Halleck Tustenugee and Chitto Hadjo, "was of course not Alligator of the Alachua band, who was then in Florida persuading his erstwhile brethren to migrate." A grave near Fort White, Florida at the Tustenuggee Methodist Church Cemetery is marked "Chief Tustenuggee" and may be the second Halpatter Tustenuggee.

== Indian Territory ==
Once in Indian Territory difficulties continued for the refugee Seminole. The Creeks had occupied the land that was set aside for the Seminoles, so the later arriving Seminoles were accepted on Cherokee land by Chief John Ross, who became a strong advocate for the Seminoles.

In 1844, Coacoochee (Wild Cat) and Halpatter Tustenuggee (Alligator) travelled to Washington, D.C. to meet with officials to advocate for the title to the Cherokee land that they were occupying. However, they refused to be identified as Creek and to submit to Creek law and authority. They insisted on being identified as a separate people since they had been at war with since 1814. Halpatter Tustenuggee is alleged to have died in Indian Territory.
