= Tustenuggee =

Tustenuggee (tvstvnvke in Muscogee) was a Muscogee title for the war leader of a tribal town. The tustenuggee was appointed by the micco (civil chief), and was responsible for leading the towns' warriors, advising the civil chief on matters relating to war, maintaining public order, and organizing stickball games with other towns. Most Seminole leaders from the period of the Seminole Wars are known by their war titles, which were always Muscogee in form, no matter what their primary language was. Tustenuggee has also become the surname of some descendants of Black Seminoles, probably from the association of an ancestor with a Seminole holding the title of tustenuggee.

Most of the following tustenuggees are known from the first half of the 19th century in Florida, primarily from the Second Seminole War:

- Tustennuggee Emathla, better known as Jim Boy or High-Head Jim of Autsi near the Tallapoosa River
- Chitto Tustenuggee, known as "Snake Warrior" to whites. He was sent by Abiaka to negotiate with the U.S. Army in 1839, and reached an (ultimately unsuccessful) agreement with General Alexander Macomb to end the Second Seminole War with the Seminoles staying in southern Florida.
- Coosa Tustenuggee, a leader of the Mikasukis in northern Florida until he agreed to go West in 1840.
- Halleck Tustenuggee, he fought against the U.S. Army until captured in 1842. He later fought on the Union side in the Civil War.
- Halpatter Tustenuggee, known as "Alligator" to whites. He was a leader in the Battle of Lake Okeechobee and in raids along the lower (northern) St. Johns River in 1842.
- Oscen Tustenuggee, a leader in the Third Seminole War.
- Souanaffee Tustenukke, a Black Seminole known as "Abraham" to whites.
- Thlocklo Tustenuggee, known as "Tiger Tail" to whites. His full title may indicate a high rank. Several towns could join together in a war and choose a tustenuggee thlacko as overall leader.
- Tustanagee Hopae, known as Little Prince to whites. He was a leader in the Lower Towns of the Muscogee Confederacy.

== Sources ==
- Mahon, John K. (1985) [1967]. History of the Second Seminole War 1835-1842 (Revised (paperback) ed.). Gainesville, Florida: University of Florida Press. ISBN 0-8130-1097-7.
