= Robert C. Buchanan =

Union army general (1811–1878)

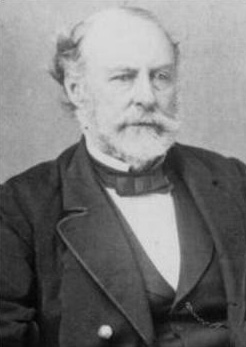
- Born: March 1, 1811; Baltimore, Maryland, U.S.
- Died: November 29, 1878 (aged 67); Washington, D.C., U.S.
- Burial place: Rock Creek Cemetery, Petworth, Washington, D.C.
- Military career
- Allegiance: United States (Union)
- Branch: United States Army (Union Army)
- Service years: 1830–1870
- Rank: Colonel; Brevet Major General
- Nickname: "Old Buck"
- Commands: District of Southern Oregon and Northern California; 1st Brigade, 2nd Division, V Corps; 1st U.S. Infantry; Department of Louisiana; Fort Porter
- Conflicts: See list: Black Hawk War; Battle of Bad Axe; Second Seminole War; Battle of Lake Okeechobee; Mexican–American War; Battle of Palo Alto; Battle of Resaca de la Palma; Battle of Molino del Rey; Battle of Chapultepec; Battle for Mexico City; Rogue River Wars; American Civil War; Peninsula campaign; Battle of Yorktown; Battle of Gaines' Mill; Battle of Glendale; Battle of Malvern Hill; Second Battle of Bull Run; Battle of Antietam; Battle of Fredericksburg

Robert Christie Buchanan (March 1, 1811 – November 29, 1878) was an American military officer who served in the Mexican–American War and then was a colonel in the Union Army during the American Civil War. In 1866, he was nominated and confirmed for appointment to the grades of brevet brigadier general and major general in the Regular Army (United States) for valor in several battles, to rank from March 13, 1865. In a career that spanned more than forty years, Buchanan held numerous commands (including several forts) and received multiple citations for bravery and distinguished service.

== Family and early life ==
Buchanan was born in Baltimore, Maryland, the son of Andrew Buchanan and Carolina Johnson. Buchanan was of Scottish ancestry. His grandfather, Andrew, served in the American Revolution as a brigadier general in the Maryland Militia. He was the nephew by marriage of President John Quincy Adams; his mother's sister was First Lady Louisa Adams.

== Early military career ==
Buchanan received his appointment to United States Military Academy at West Point during Adams' administration and graduated in 1830. He was soon assigned to the 4th U.S. Infantry as a brevet second lieutenant. His assignments included service in the Black Hawk War (he commanded gunboats during the Battle of Bad Axe) and against the Seminoles, as well as in the removal of the Cherokees to the Indian Territory. He was wounded while fighting the Seminoles at the Battle of Lake Okeechobee in 1837. He was promoted to captain during his service in Florida.

Buchanan participated in the Mexican War in command of the Maryland Volunteers. He was in the Battle of Chapultepec, the Battle of Palo Alto, the Battle of Resaca de la Palma, the Battle of Molino del Rey, and the capture of Mexico City. For his service in Mexico, Buchanan was twice brevetted in recognition of his gallantry in action. In 1847 Buchanan became a veteran member of the Aztec Club of 1847 – a military society of officers who had served in the Mexican War.

After the war, Buchanan was assigned to various posts and recruiting duty. In 1853, the 4th Infantry was assigned to the Pacific coast in northern California. He established Fort Humboldt which served as a buffer between settlers, prospectors and Native Americans. Under his command was Captain Ulysses S. Grant. When Grant's drinking allegedly began to affect his duties, Buchanan allegedly asked for and received Grant's resignation from the Army.

In 1855, Buchanan was promoted to major. He commanded the District of Southern Oregon and Northern California from Fort Humboldt, and participated in the Rogue River Wars in Oregon.

== Civil War ==
Buchanan was stationed in San Francisco, California, at the beginning of the Civil War. He was ordered east, and his regiment was placed in the defenses surrounding Washington, D.C. He was given command of a brigade in Skye's division, serving there until the Spring of 1862. He was promoted to lieutenant colonel in the regular army on September 9, 1861, and given command of a brigade in what became the Army of the Potomac.

In the summer of 1862 Buchanan served with distinction in the Seven Days Battles and was twice brevetted. He participated in the Peninsula Campaign, including the Battle of Yorktown, and the Seven Days Battles, including the Battle of Gaines' Mill, the Battle of Glendale, and the Battle of Malvern Hill. He then fought in the Northern Virginia Campaign in the Second Battle of Bull Run.

Buchanan, by then nicknamed "Old Buck" by his men, commanded the 1st Brigade, 2nd Division, V Corps during the Maryland Campaign (part of Brigadier General George Sykes's Regulars). At Antietam, Buchanan strongly protested a decision to halt his advance on what he maintained was a weakly defended portion of the enemy line. In his opinion, his Regulars could have and should have carried Cemetery Hill, defended primarily by artillery with only the depleted Virginia brigade of Richard B. Garnett in support.

Buchanan was appointed brigadier general of volunteers on November 29, 1862, but his appointment expired on March 4, 1863, having not been confirmed by the U.S. Senate. Historian Ezra Warner suggests that Buchanan's association with Fitz John Porter was the reason for the Senate's inaction on the nomination. Since the expired brigadier general appointment was Buchanan's only volunteer appointment, he reverted to his Regular Army grade of lieutenant colonel and brevet colonel and was not in the volunteer force. Shortly after this appointment, and before its expiration, Buchanan commanded regulars and fought at the Battle of Antietam and at the Battle of Fredericksburg in 1862.

Buchanan then went on recruiting duty and two months later was placed in command of the defenses of Fort Delaware, a prisoner of war facility, March–April, 1863. He then was assistant provost marshal general at Trenton, New Jersey, April 29, 1863–November 8, 1864. On February 8, 1864, he was promoted to colonel of the 1st U.S. Infantry Regiment through seniority.

For his service at the Battle of Malvern Hill, on April 10, 1866, President Andrew Johnson nominated Buchanan for appointment to the grade of brevet brigadier general, U.S. Army, to rank from March 13, 1865, and the U.S. Senate confirmed the appointment on May 4, 1866. In recognition of Buchanan's service at the Battle of Second Bull Run and the Battle of Fredericksburg, on June 30, 1866, President Andrew Johnson nominated Buchanan for appointment to the grade of brevet major general, U.S. Army, to rank from March 13, 1865, and the U.S. Senate confirmed the appointment on July 25, 1866.

== Postbellum ==
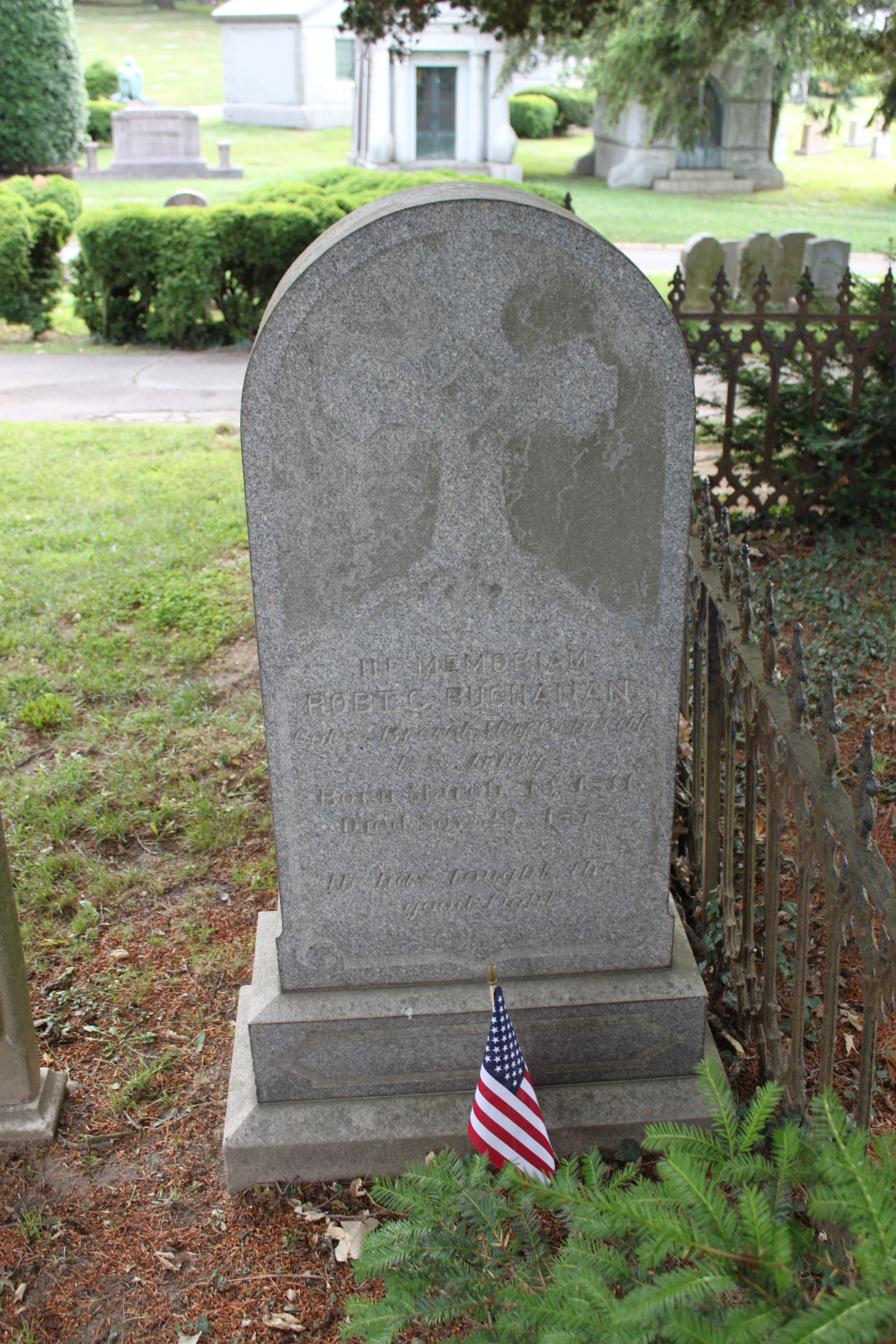
Grave of Buchanan at Rock Creek Cemetery

After the war, as colonel in the Regular Army, Buchanan was placed in command of the 1st U.S. Infantry at New Orleans and helped enforce Reconstruction activities with his men. He subsequently commanded the Department of Louisiana, and then served in the Freedmen's Bureau. A further nomination of Buchanan to brigadier general, October 15, 1868, was tabled by the U. S. Senate and not acted upon.

He retired from the Army on December 31, 1870. At the time of his retirement, he was in command of Fort Porter in New York.

Robert C. Buchanan died in Washington, D.C., on November 29, 1878, and is buried at the Rock Creek Cemetery.

== See also ==
- List of American Civil War brevet generals (Union)

== Bibliography ==
- Military biography of Robert C. Buchanan from the Cullum biographies
- Eicher, John H.; Eicher, David J. (2001). Civil War High Commands. Stanford: Stanford University Press. ISBN 978-0-8047-3641-1.
- Johnson, Rossiter (editor), The Twentieth Century Biographical Dictionary of Notable Americans. Boston: The Biographical Society, 1904.
- Warner, Ezra J. (1964). Generals in Blue: Lives of the Union Commanders. Louisiana State University Press, Baton Rouge. ISBN 978-0-8071-0822-2.
