= Oscen Tustenuggee =

Seminole leader in Third Seminole War

Oscen (died 1856) was the tustenuggee (war-chief) of a Muscogee village in southern Florida, and the most aggressive Seminole leader early in the Third Seminole War.

== Name ==
Nineteenth-century sources used various spellings, including "Okchan", "Okchum", "Okchun", and "Oxian". "Tustenuggee" (tvstvnvke) is not a surname, but rather the Muscogee word for the war-chief of a tribal town.

== Origin ==
Oscen was a Mikasuki who married a Muscogee woman and, as was customary in Mikasuki and Muscogee culture, lived in her village on Fisheating Creek west of Lake Okeechobee. One source says that village was led by Echo Emathla Chipco, but a later source places Chipco's village of Tallahassees (a Muscogee band that lived near the site of Tallahassee in the early 19th century) on the Kissimmee River, distinct from the village on Fisheating Creek where Oscen lived.

== Third Seminole War ==
At the end of the Second Seminole War, the most powerful leaders of the Seminoles in Florida were Hollata Micco (Billy Bowlegs), chief of the Alachua Seminoles, and Abiaka (Sam Jones), chief of the Mikasukis, although other bands, primarily Muscogee, which were only loosely affiliated with the Alachuas and Mikasukis, were also present. By the start of the Third Seminole War, Abiaka was in his 70s and losing influence. Two leaders of Muscogee towns, Chipco and Oscen, while less influential than Hollata Micco, were the most aggressive leaders in the early part of the war.

Oscen had one or two dozen followers at the start of the war, and organized many of the war parties early in the war. His band was one of two or three Muscogee bands that were operating north of Lake Okeechobee in early 1856, and he became the primary offensive leader of those Muscogees.

While the federal and state troops in Florida remained on the defensive, Oscen adopted a strategy of ambush followed by a quick retreat. He was the only Seminole leader to consistently take the war to the whites, attacking areas around Tampa Bay and elsewhere in southwest Florida. Other Seminole leaders mostly remained on the defensive.

=== Early 1856 ===
Fort Denaud was an Army post on the Caloosahatchee River. There were 150 soldiers in the garrison of the fort, and the need for wood for cooking and for smudge fires meant that parties of soldiers had to venture out every day to gather wood. On January 18, 1856, a party led by Oscen killed five out of a party of six soldiers returning to the fort with a load of wood. The sole survivor identified Oscen ("Okchum") as the leader.

On March 3, 1856, a dozen Seminoles, possibly led by Oscen, attacked the Sarasota plantation of Hamlin Snell, president of the Florida Senate. They killed one man and burned Snell's house and its kitchen.

=== April, 1856 ===
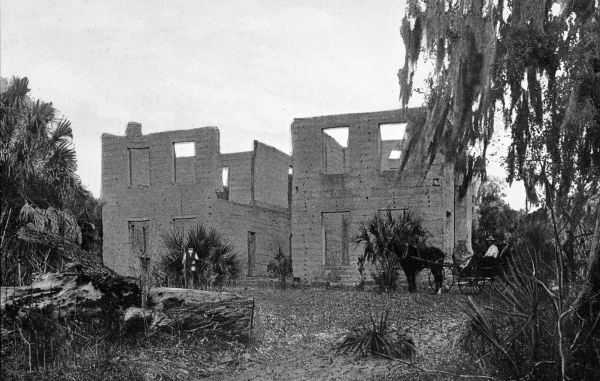
Photo of ruins of Braden Castle (house) in Bradenton, Florida taken in about 1900.

Joseph Braden had established a plantation in the community of Manatee (now Bradenton, Florida), and had built a two-story tabby house, which became known as the Braden Castle. Seminoles led by Oscen attacked the Braden Castle on the evening of March 31, 1856. Braden returned fire at the Seminoles from within the house, hitting one. The Seminoles then left the house and looted the plantation slave quarters, taking seven slaves, mostly women and children, and three mules.

Word was sent to Florida militia that were stationed on the Peace River, and a small number of militiamen led by John Addison left in pursuit. The Seminoles (about 10 in number) were moving slowly because of the captured slaves.

The militia caught up to the Seminoles on April 4, but held off while sending for supplies and reinforcements. On April 5 a reinforced party tracked the Seminoles to Big Charley Apopka Creek to the east of the Peace River, where the Seminoles had stopped to cook and eat a cow they had killed. The militia attacked at 1 PM, killing at least two of the Seminoles. Oscen escaped by swimming across the creek, but the militia captured his pony.

Despite the loss at Big Charlie Apopka Creek, a week later, on April 12, Seminoles likey led by Oscen burned one abandoned house and looted another on the upper Manatee River, and three days later, on April 15, killed a settler, John Carney, as he worked in his fields on the Alafia River.

=== May, 1856 ===
On May 14, 1856, an estimated 20 to 30 Seminoles, again likely led by Oscen, attacked the double-pen house of Robert Bradley in what is now Pasco County, 34 miles (55 km) north of Tampa. The attack came as dusk was falling, with an initial volley of about ten musket shots which immediately killed two of Bradley's children who were playing in the breezeway running through the middle of the house. Bradley fired at a group of Seminoles who were starting to enter the breezeway, apparently wounding one, and the Seminoles left.

Three days later, Oscen led a group of six to eight Seminoles in an attack on a small wagon train carrying supplies from Tampa to Fort Fraser, killing three, including the son of one of the teamsters.

=== June, 1856 ===
Willoughby Tillis, his family, and Thomas Underhill were living in a house 1.5 to 2 miles (2.4 to 3.2 km) south of Fort Meade while they were building houses on their land claims under the Armed Occupation Act. Tillis had settled with his family on a claim 3.5 miles (5.6 km) south of Fort Meade, living in a storage shed while building a house. Following warnings that he was exposing his family to Seminole raiders, the family moved to the Russell farm, sharing the house with the Thomas Underhill family.

At dawn on June 14, 18 Seminoles led by Oscen attacked the Russell house. Tillis and Underhill were able to hold off the attackers. Neighbors heard the gunfire and sent word to Fort Meade. Most of the militia at Fort Meade were away, but six volunteers, composed of cowboys and led by Lieutenant Alderman Carlton, reached the house. Hearing the militiamen approach, the Seminoles retreated to a thicket. Although advised that they were outnumbered, the militiamen pursued the Seminoles into the thicket. In hand-to-hand fighting, Lt. Carlton and two of the militiamen were killed, and three others were wounded. The surviving volunteers retreated to the farm house.

The attack on the Tillis farm may have been due to "bad blood" between Tillis and Oscen, going back to the Second Seminole War. The Seminoles had reportedly been keeping watch on Fort Meade, and may have picked a time when most volunteers were away from the fort to attack the Russell farm.

=== Battle of Peace River ===
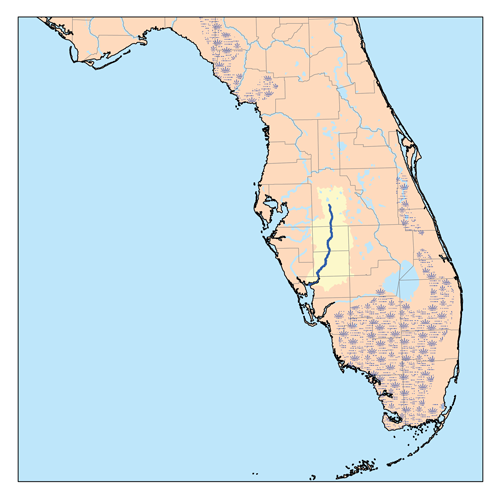
Location of the Peace River

News of the attack on the Russell farm reached Fort Fraser, and a detachment of 17 militiamen was sent to the farm. A patrol of eight to ten militiamen led by Lt. Streaty Parker reached the farm after the fighting and tracked the Seminoles to a hammock. The patrol then returned to Fort Meade for reinforcement and supplies. In June 16, 25 men led by Lt. Parker left Fort Meade and searched for the Seminoles along the Peace River. The next morning the militiamen found the Seminoles and immediately attacked. Oscen was killed trying to cross the river.

The Seminoles hid Oscen's body in a palmetto patch and build a log pen over his body, but militiamen discovered the site and removed his body.

After the death of Oscen and many of his followers, his band was effectively out of the war and the focus of the war shifted to the Kissimmee River valley, the Big Cypress Swamp, and the Everglades.

== Sources ==
- Brown, Canter, Jr. (1991). Florida's Peace River Frontier. Orlando, Florida: University of Central Florida Press. ISBN 0-8130-1037-3.
- Brown, Canter (1995). Fort Meade, 1849-1900. University of Alabama Press. pp. 26–30. ISBN 978-0-8173-0763-9.
- Covington, James W. (1966). "An Episode in the Third Seminole War". The Florida Historical Quarterly. 45 (1): 45–59. ISSN 0015-4113.
- Covington, James W. (1993). The Seminoles of Florida. Gainesville, Florida: University Press of Florida. ISBN 9780813011967.
- Knetsch, Joe; Missall, John; Missall, Mary Lou (2019). History of the Third Seminole War 1849–1858. Philadelphia: Casemate. ISBN 9781612005768.
- Mahon, John K. (1985) [1967]. History of the Second Seminole War 1835-1842 (Revised (paperback) ed.). Gainesville, Florida: University of Florida Press. ISBN 0-8130-1097-7.
