= Battle of Lake Okeechobee =

1837 battle of the Second Seminole War

- Part of Second Seminole War
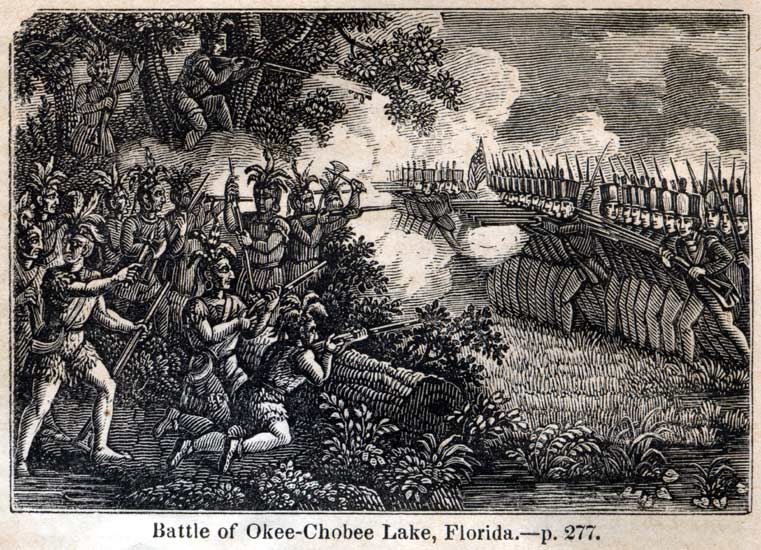
- Engraving of the battle made by John Warner Barber in 1847
Date	December 25, 1837
Location	Shore of Lake Okeechobee, Florida, U.S. 27°12′45.44″N 80°47′6.43″W
Result	Seminole victory: Zachary Taylor's army retreats back to Tampa

Belligerents
United States	Seminole

Commanders and leaders
Zachary Taylor; Richard Gentry †; Alexander R. Thompson †	Abiaka; Billy Bowlegs; Halpatter Tustenuggee (Alligator); Wild Cat

Strength
1,100	400

Casualties and losses
26 killed (mainly officers); 112 wounded	11 killed 14 wounded

The Battle of Lake Okeechobee was one of the major battles of the Seminole Wars. It was fought between 1,000 U.S. Army troops of the 1st, 4th, and 6th Infantry Regiments and 132 Missouri Volunteers under the command of Colonel Zachary Taylor, and about 400 Seminole warriors led by chiefs Abiaka, Billy Bowlegs, Halpatter Tustenuggee (Alligator) and Wild Cat on 25 December 1837. The Seminoles defended their large encampment by Lake Okeechobee against an attack by Zachary Taylor's troops. Zachary Taylor's march to Lake Okeechobee was part of a larger offensive into South Florida that was planned by General Thomas Jesup. The battle was a victory for the Seminoles, as they held off the U.S. troops long enough to safely evacuate their encampment. Due to the large number of casualties his troops suffered (especially among the officers), Zachary Taylor was forced to end his offensive into South Florida, and he marched his army over 100 miles back to Tampa Bay.

== Background ==
Major General Thomas Jesup was placed in command of the war in Florida in December 1836. In late 1837, Jesup planned a major offensive into Southern Florida to finally defeat and remove the Seminoles from Florida. In November, four U.S. Military columns started sweeping down the peninsula. One column led by Levin M. Powell moved down the east coast from the Mosquito Inlet along the Indian River. A second column led by Jesup himself moved south along the St. Johns River. A third column crossed from Tampa to the Kissimmee River and then proceeded down the river to Lake Okeechobee. The fourth column moved up the Caloosahatchee River. Colonel Taylor was in charge of the third column. Jesup ordered him to set up a depot somewhere near the Peace River.

Taylor built Fort Gardner (near Lake Tohopekaliga) on the Kissimmee River. On December 19, Taylor left Fort Gardiner with more than 1,000 men, marching down south along the Kissimmee towards Lake Okeechobee. As a number of Seminoles surrendered to Taylor's column, he stopped to build Fort Basinger, and left prisoners, guards, and sick men there. During the march, Taylor's scouts reported that there was a very large gathering of 2,000 Seminoles (men, women, and children) led by Chief Abiaka on the northern shore of Lake Okeechobee. Lieutenant Robert C. Buchanan wrote in his diary two days before the battle that he hoped that the United States could defeat the Seminoles "in one blow" by catching Abiaka.

== Events of the battle ==
Taylor's army came up to a large hammock with half a mile of swamp in front of it. On the far side of the hammock was Lake Okeechobee. Here the saw grass stood five feet high. The mud and water were three feet deep. Horses would be of no use. It was obvious that the Seminole meant this to be the battleground. They had cut the grass in front of their position to provide an open field of fire, and had notched the trees to steady their rifles. Their scouts were perched in the treetops to follow every movement of the troops coming up. In his diary, Lieutenant Robert C. Buchanan said that the Seminole warriors were placed in "the strongest position that I have ever seen in Florida". The Seminoles had also placed canoes on the lake shore near their encampment to prepare for their evacuation.

At about half past noon, the sun shining directly overhead and the air still and quiet, Taylor moved his troops squarely into the center of the swamp. His plan was to make a direct attack rather than encircle the Indians. All his men were on foot. In the first line were the 132 Missouri volunteers. As soon as they came within range, the Indians opened with heavy fire. The Missourians suffered heavy casualties, and their commander, Richard Gentry, was fatally wounded leading them. Despite his wounds, he managed to lead them for an hour before collapsing. To escape the kill zone in the swamp, the Missourians pushed into the hammock. The Indians then mounted a counterattack on the remaining soldiers. In the deadly assault some of the soldiers were scalped by the Indians. Gentry had suggested to Taylor before the battle an encirclement strategy which Taylor rejected, charging that Gentry was afraid of a direct confrontation. This could have motivated Gentry to keep charging the Seminole positions even though the original battle plan had the militia retreating at the first sign of enemy fire to re-form behind the regular army lines.

As a result of the additional casualties induced by the continued charge, the Missourians lost cohesion, but continued fighting. The fighting in the saw grass was deadliest for five companies of the Sixth Infantry; every officer but one, and most of their noncommissioned officers were killed or wounded. When that part of the regiment retired a short distance to re-form, they found only four men of these companies unharmed. The 6th Infantry's commander, Lieutenant Colonel Alexander R. Thompson, was among the dead. Lieutenant William H.T. Walker, later a general in the Confederate Army, was wounded in the neck, shoulder, chest, left arm, and also his leg during the battle. Lieutenant Frank Brooke, the nephew of Virginia Governor Robert Brooke, was also among the dead. Lieutenant Robert C. Buchanan (who was also wounded) wrote in his diary after the battle that "A sad Christmas has this been; for us and our friends."

26 U.S. soldiers, including the majority of Taylor's officers and NCOs, were killed, with 112 wounded, against 11 Seminoles killed and 14 wounded. The Seminole warriors had specifically targeted the U.S. military officers during the battle. The battle stopped Taylor's troops from further advancing south and no Seminoles were captured, although Taylor's scouts did capture 100 ponies and 600 head of cattle the day after the battle. In guerrilla warfare fashion, the Seminole warriors had successfully held off the U.S. troops long enough for their people to evacuate their encampment, and they then withdrew across Lake Okeechobee on their canoes. Due to the large number of casualties that Zachary Taylor's army suffered, they were forced to retreat over 100 miles back to Tampa.

Years later in 1852, Seminole chief Holata Micco (also known as Billy Bowlegs) visited Washington and on being escorted through the buildings of the Capitol and viewing many statues and paintings, he suddenly halted before a portrait of Zachary Taylor, grinned and exclaimed: "Me whip!" (I beat him!). There are now over four thriving Seminole Indian reservations located in south Florida, one of which is in Okeechobee County (the location of the battle).

== Battlefield preservation ==
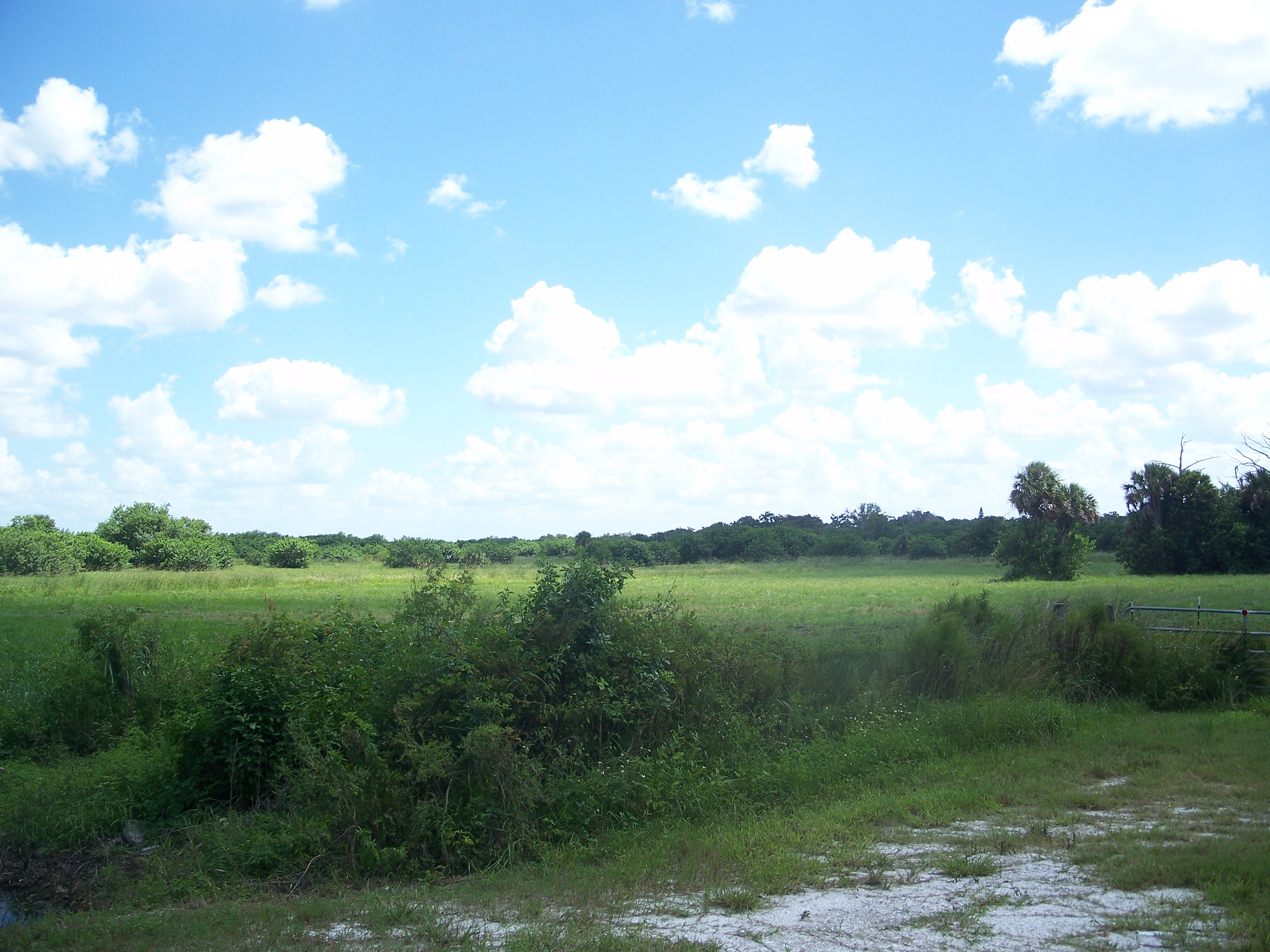
Okeechobee Battlefield in 2010

The National Trust for Historic Preservation named the site on a list of "America's Most Endangered Historic Places 2000". The state of Florida spent $3.2 million for a 145-acre (0.59 km^{2}) park. An annual battle reenactment is held to raise money for the State park.

Archaeological investigations carried out at the park by the U.S. National Park Service in 2015 failed to locate any evidence of the 1837 battle. The exact location of the fighting remains unknown.

== Sources ==
- Tucker, Phillip Thomas (October 1991). "A Forgotten Sacrifice: Richard Gentry, Missouri Volunteers, and the Battle of Okeechobee". Florida Historical Quarterly. 70 (2): 150–164 – via University of Central Florida Digital collection.
