= Alexander R. Thompson =

American military officer (1793–1837)

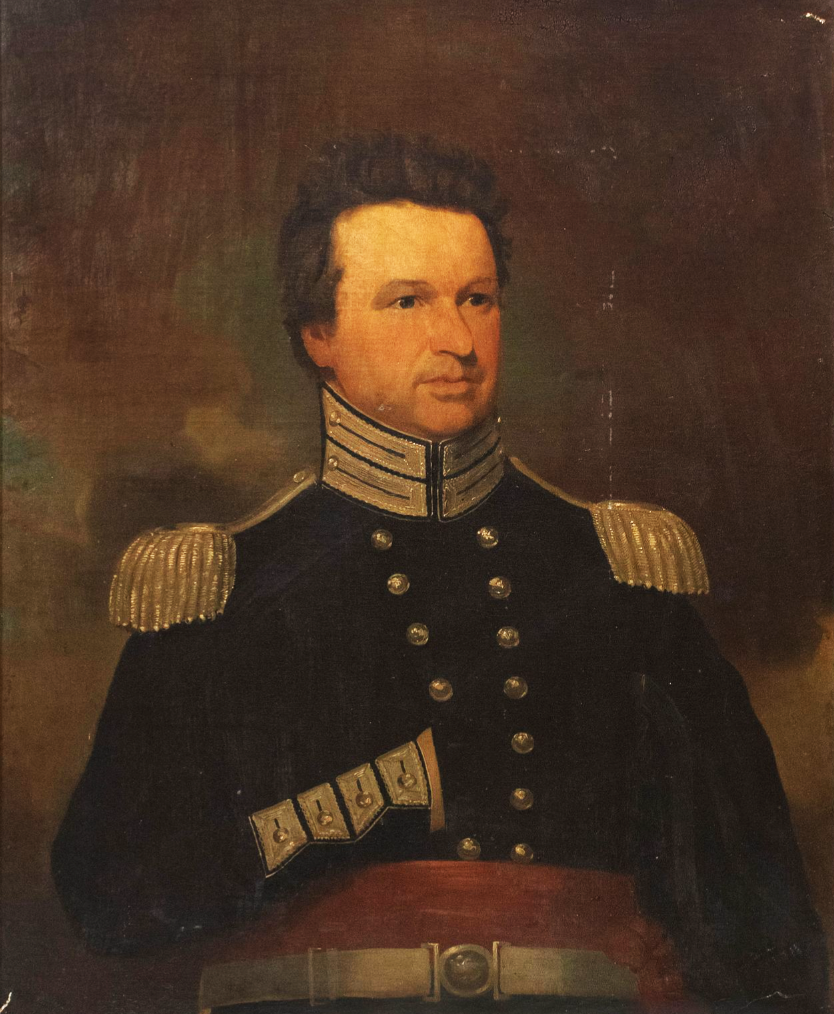
- Born: February 19, 1793; New York City, New York, U.S.
- Died: December 25, 1837 (age 44) near Lake Okeechobee, Florida, U.S.
- Burial place: West Point Cemetery, New York, U.S.
- Education: West Point Military Academy
- Spouse: Mary Nexsen
- Military career
- Allegiance: United States
- Branch: United States Army
- Service years: 1812 - 1837
- Rank: Lieutenant Colonel
- Unit: 6th Infantry Regiment
- Conflicts: War of 1812; Battle of Plattsburgh; Black Hawk War; Second Seminole War; Battle of Lake Okeechobee †

Alexander Ramsey Thompson Jr. (1793–1837) was an American soldier. He was a graduate of the West Point Military Academy, who fought in the War of 1812, Black Hawk War, and the Second Seminole War. Thompson was killed by Seminole Indians at the Battle of Lake Okeechobee in Florida in 1837.

== Biography ==
Thompson was born in 1793 in New York City to Alexander Thompson Sr. and Amelia De Hart. Thompson Sr. was of English descent and Amelia De Hart was of Dutch descent. His father Thompson Sr. was an artillery officer in the Continental Army during the U.S. War of Independence, where he had served in Lamb's Artillery Regiment. After the war, Thompson Sr. was put in charge of the Army garrison on Governors Island, and he later helped build the military academy at West Point. Thompson Sr. died at West Point in 1809.

Thompson enrolled in the West Point Military Academy in 1810 at the age of 17. He graduated shortly before the War of 1812 began, and was commissioned as a First Lieutenant in the 6th Infantry Regiment. When the war started, Thompson first fought in Canada during the two failed invasions led by General James Wilkinson north of the St. Lawrence River, and afterwards he was promoted to Captain. He then fought at the Battle of Plattsburgh in 1814. During this battle, Thompson commanded 100 soldiers and successfully defended a bridge against attacks from the British Army. After the War of 1812, Thompson was assigned to garrison duty at various U.S. Army forts in Louisiana, Kansas, Michigan, New York, Wisconsin, and Missouri. In 1832 he was involved in the Black Hawk War and was promoted to Major afterwards.

In 1837, Thompson was promoted to Lieutenant Colonel and was assigned to Florida to fight against the Seminole tribe who were resisting Indian Removal. Thompson and his men left Fort Jesup and embarked for Florida, where they landed at Fort Brooke on Tampa Bay. After arriving at Tampa, Thompson and his soldiers of the 6th Infantry Regiment were put under the command of Colonel Zachary Taylor, and they then marched inland to Fort Gardiner. Zachary Taylor was amassing a large force at Fort Gardiner to launch an offensive into South Florida, where most of the Seminoles were now located. On December 19, 1837, Colonel Taylor and his troops began their march south from Fort Gardiner along the Kissimmee River, and after six days they reached Lake Okeechobee and located a large gathering of Seminole Indians led by Chief Abiaka on the northern shore of the lake. Taylor's army then moved to attack these Seminoles, which began the Battle of Lake Okeechobee on 25 December 1837.

The Seminole warriors were positioned in a dense hammock across a field of swamp from the U.S. troops. Zachary Taylor first ordered the volunteers from the Missouri Militia to charge at the Seminoles. This attack ended in disaster as the Missourians panicked after losing their commander, Richard Gentry. Taylor then ordered Thompson and the 6th Infantry Regiment to charge at the Seminole position. As Thompson and his men charged at the hammock, they were put under intense rifle fire from the Seminoles, who killed and wounded nearly all of the officers of the 6th Infantry Regiment. The Seminoles specifically targeted the U.S. military officers during the battle as part of their tactics. Thompson himself was shot twice in the chest during the infantry charge. Even though he was wounded, Thompson continued to limp forward, and said to his soldiers: "Keep steady men; charge the hammock - remember the regiment to which you belong!". Thompson was then shot a third time in the chest by the Seminoles, which killed him. After three hours of fighting, the Seminoles withdrew after inflicting heavy casualties on the U.S. troops, and canoed south across Lake Okeechobee. Thompson and the other dead soldiers were then temporarily buried at the battleground. Due to his army suffering heavy casualties, especially among the officers, Colonel Zachary Taylor was forced to end his offensive into South Florida, and marched his troops a long distance back to Tampa Bay. In January 1838, a group of Seminoles returned to the battleground and desecrated the graves of the dead soldiers, including Thompson's grave. Thompson's remains were later reinterned at West Point.
