= Fort Porter =

Fort in New York

Coordinates: 42°54′02″N 78°53′48″W

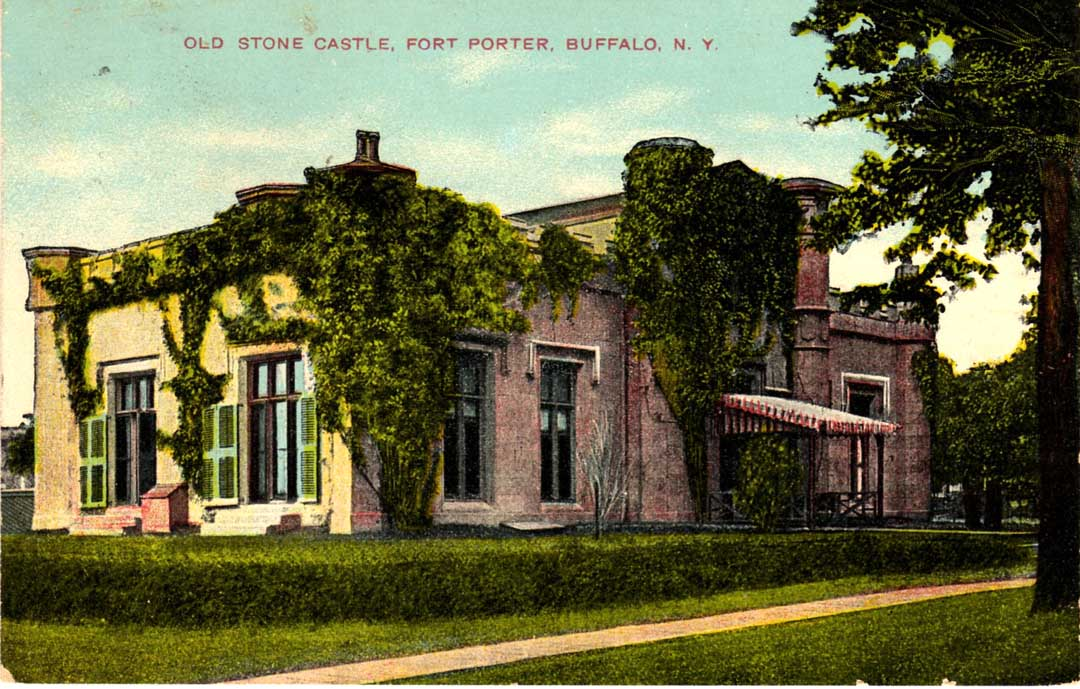
Old Stone Castle, Fort Porter

Fort Porter was constructed between 1841 and 1844 at Buffalo in Erie County, New York, and named for General Peter Buell Porter. The site was bounded by Porter Avenue, Busti Avenue and the Erie Barge Canal. It was initially a square masonry two-story redoubt, 62 feet (19 m) square, with crenelated walls surrounded by large earthworks and moat. The fort was considered the largest masonry "blockhouse" ever built; it burned in November 1863. The "castle" had been built in 1836 as a home for Col. James McKay. This was part of the government acquisition of land in 1841 and was used as the commandant's quarters.

Fort Porter had not been used for some time when the Civil War started. It was used as the headquarters of the 74th Regiment, New York Army National Guard. Ten 60 by 18 foot barracks were constructed and used as a recruiting center. In 1898, the post was reactivated for the Spanish–American War and used as the headquarters for 13th U.S. Infantry. In 1917, it was reactivated again for World War I and used as U.S. Army Base Hospital 23 until the unit shipped out. At the end of World War I, it was used as U.S. General Hospital 4 for returning wounded. In 1926, the property was sold to provide approaches to new Peace Bridge at Front Park and all evidence was removed. A boulder dedicated in 1899, as a token of the city's esteem for the regiment, was removed to a place outside the Buffalo History Museum.

Fort Porter had an American football team that was active in 1917 and in 1920, playing teams in the informal New York Pro Football League.
