= Thlocklo Tustenuggee =

Seminole leader

Chief Thlocklo Tustenuggee
- Rvro or Rakkē Tvstvnvke (Creek)
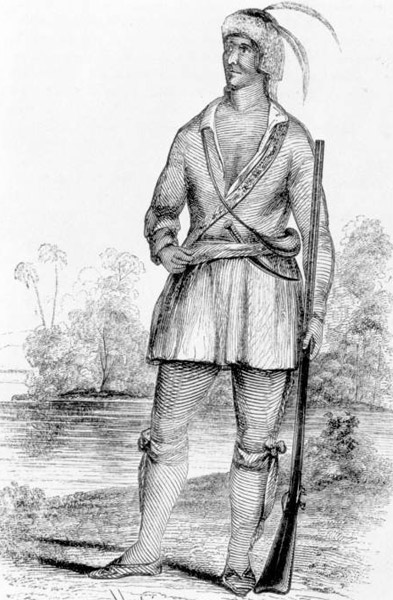
- Died: Near Miami River in Florida, United States of America
- Military career
- Allegiance: Seminole Tribe of Florida
- Nickname: Tiger Tail
- Conflicts: Second Seminole War; Dade Battle

Thlocklo Tustenuggee (Creek: Rvro Tvstvnvke or Rakkē Tvstvnvke, also known as Thlocko, Thlocco, and Tiger Tail) was one of the most prominent Seminole leaders in the Second Seminole War. He spoke English fluently, and also spoke Muscogee. Tustenuggee was one of the three leaders of the 300 Seminoles who fought in the battle that became known as the Dade Massacre. During the war, he and Halleck Tustenuggee, another prominent Seminole leader in the war, met with General Walker Keith Armistead to negotiate, but negotiations broke down and the war resumed. As the war waned, Armistead used money to bribe several Seminole leaders to surrender, but Tustenuggee refused to be bribed and he continued to lead his band in fighting. When the war ended, his Seminole band was one of the few that remained in Florida.

Tustenuggee's final years and death are debated by historians. By November 1842, it seemed that the Seminole Chief was willing to gave in and accept forced emigration. A contemporary, John Sprague, wrote that Tustenuggee died immediately after arriving in New Orleans on his way west. Alternatively, others claim that rather than leave Florida, Tustenuggee committed suicide in Fort Myers by swallowing powdered glass. Another author stated that Tustenuggee never left Florida and evaded capture because U.S. troops found a body that resembled the chief but was not him (the body was reportedly disfigured from a drunken brawl, thus making identification difficult). The last report was an obituary from the Tallahassee Floridian, published in October 1881, which stated that Tiger Tail died at about the age of 90 somewhere near Miami the previous month.
