= Wild Cat (Seminole) =

Alachua band (c. 1810–1857)

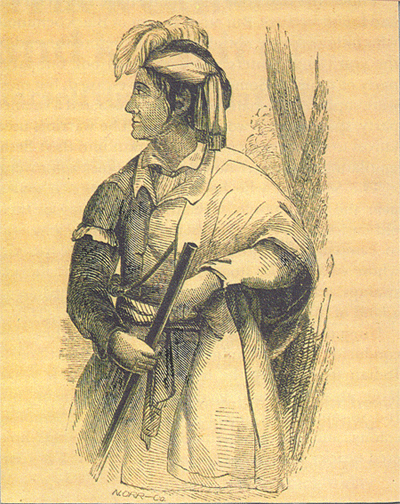
Chief Coacoochee or Cowacoochee aka Wild Cat

Wild Cat, also known as Coacoochee or Cowacoochee (from Creek Kowakkuce "bobcat, wildcat") (c. 1807/1810 – 1857) was a leading Seminole chieftain during the later stages of the Second Seminole War and the nephew of Micanopy.

== Early years and family history ==
Wild Cat's (Coacoochee) exact year and place of birth is unknown. Seminole scholars believe he was born between 1808 and 1815 on an island in Lake Tohopekaliga, south of present-day Orlando. After the United States purchased Florida from Spain in 1821, tensions mounted between the Seminole and incoming white settlers, who took Seminole cattle ranches. Because Seminoles allowed slaves to live in their own family compounds and to work cattle, black slaves from neighboring Georgia escaped to Florida. Members of the powerful Wind clan, Coacooche's parents were King Phillip (or Emathla) and his wife from the Micco Nuppa family. Wild Cat may have had a twin sister who died at birth. As a twin, he was regarded by Seminoles as having special gifts. Before the Second Seminole War began, he and his family moved to a Seminole village along the St. Johns River in northern Florida, along with other Seminoles who had chosen to resist removal to Florida.

== Second Seminole War (1835–1843) ==
The U.S. began the Second Seminole War December 1835, with the expressed goal to find every Seminole village, destroy it, and send any living Seminole to Indian Territory. The war's first battle was a successful Seminole ambush of two U.S. Army companies under the command of Frances Dade. Only four men survived and the deaths of 106 U.S. troops put the Seminole war and its warriors on the front pages of U.S. newspapers. As a young adult and the son of a micco, Coacoochee joined raiding parties against Florida white settlers and US Army forts.

Wild Cat's father, Emathla or King Philip was captured by American soldiers in September 1837, and imprisoned at Fort Moultrie in South Carolina. After his father died in 1838 and the more visible leader Osceola was imprisoned in 1837, Wild Cat became the most important leader of the Seminoles. Newspapers reported that Wild Cat's band of warriors included both Seminoles and formerly enslaved people and that he was especially crafty as a leader. After Osceola's capture in 1837, Coacoochee appeared before American forces in a ceremonial peace headdress, claiming to be an emissary of the war chief Osceola. After he negotiated with Colonel Thomas S. Jesup, American authorities agreed to peace talks, but when the Seminole representatives arrived without weapons and intending to agree to a peace treaty, Jessup ordered their arrest. While imprisoned at Fort Marion, Wild Cat escaped with nineteen other Seminole. They reportedly fasted for six days until they could slide between the bars of their jail cell; they then dropped from the walls into the moat on the outside of the fort. Wild Cat and several other leaders continued to fight the U.S. Army for two more years by using Florida's swamps and heavily forested interior to regroup and plan attacks.

== Removal to Indian Territory ==
Growing depressed over his forced surrender, he was said to have stated, "I was in hopes I would be killed in battle, but a bullet never reached me." When Coacoochee arrived in Indian Territory in 1841 with his remaining 200 followers, like other Seminoles he was assigned land in a community long settled by Osage people and recently given to Muscogee Creeks. Because of his lineage and efforts in the war, he became one of several miccos (leaders). Now aged about 25, he met with Major Ethan Allan Hitchcock, now inspecting Fort Gibson, and decided to locate his people in the Cherokee Nation rather than settling on the towns along the North Canadian River within Muscogee territory.

Traveling to Washington, D.C., in 1843 with Alligator as part of a Seminole delegation, Wild Cat failed to gain financial aid for the Seminole. The tribe had suffered a series of floods on their reservation, as well as slave raids by neighboring Creek. (The latter captured free blacks and Indians and sold them to southern slave holders, although Indian slavery had long been prohibited). This devastated both Black and Indian Seminole and conditions continued to worsen until 1849.

== New opportunities in Mexico ==
In 1849, Coacoochee and John Cowaya, who had known each other in Florida, led a group of Seminoles and their Black kinspeople to Mexico. They sought freedom from Creek domination and hoped that the Black Seminoles might get liberty from slavery. After spending several months in Texas, the Seminoles joined up with some Kickapoos, and crossed over into Mexico in 1850. The mixed group of Native people, about 351 strong, was hired by the Mexican government to work as border guards in Piedras Negras. Coacoochee, the Seminoles, and the Kickapoos received a land grants of 70,000 acres in return for patrolling against Lipan Apaches and Comanches and to protect former slaves who had escaped from Texas.

Several months later Coacoochee (Wildcat) returned to Indian territory and recruited 30 to 40 more Seminole families along with nearly all of the Black Seminoles who remained in Indian Territory. They all arrived at the new military colony in the fall of 1851 and built several towns surrounded by fields, animal pens, and fences. Within a year, 356 blacks, mostly fugitive slaves had settled in the community.

Joined by about one thousand Kickapoo, Wild Cat's band eventually established a new community in Mexico. The government awarded the tribe an area of land in recognition for their service against Apache and Comanche raiders. Earning a commission as Colonel in the Mexican army, Wild Cat would live with the Seminole in Alto, Mexico until his death of smallpox in 1857. His son Gato Chiquito (in Spanish), or Young Wild Cat, was chosen as chief.

== Quotes ==
- "I speak for myself, for I am free. Each of the others also speak for themselves. We are a choir of voices that will drown out your lies."
