= Fort Basinger (Seminole War Fort) =

- Approximately 35 miles west of Fort Pierce along U. S. Highway 98 in Highlands County, Florida. in United States
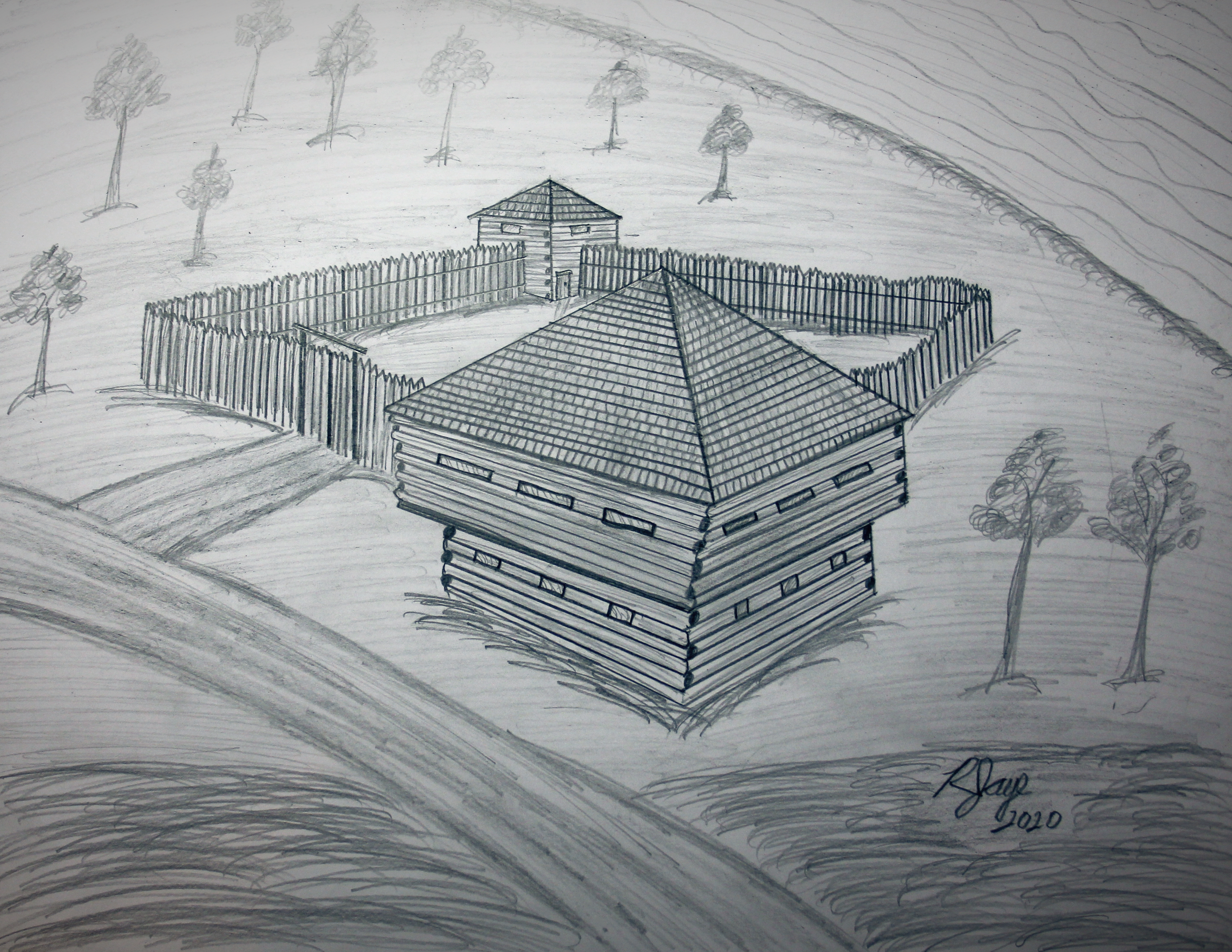
- Fort Basinger - Second and Third Seminole War Fort (artist's depiction).

Site information
- Condition: Completely destroyed.

Location
- Location of Fort Basinger Fort Basinger (the United States)
- Coordinates: 27°21′46″N 81°03′10″W

Site history
- Built: 1837
- Built by: United States Army
- In use: 1837-1858
- Materials: Pine logs (stockade and two blockhouses).
- Fate: Abandoned after the Third Seminole War (1855–1858) and eroded away.
- Battles/wars: Battle of Lake Okeechobee
- Events: Fort Basinger was built as a supply garrison and for prisoner detention, and aided wounded troops after the Battle of Lake Okeechobee.

Garrison information
- Past commanders: Colonel Zachary Taylor
- Garrison: Regular army troops and Militia.

Fort Basinger's original site is located approximately 35 miles (56 km) west of Fort Pierce, Florida, along U. S. Highway 98 in Highlands County, Florida. It was a stockaded fortification with two blockhouses that was built in 1837 by the United States Army. It was one of the military outposts created during the Second Seminole War to assist Colonel Zachary Taylor's troops to confront and capture Seminole Indians and their allies in the central part of the Florida Territory in the Lake Okeechobee region. The Seminole Indians and their allies were resisting forced removal to federal territory west of the Mississippi River as directed by the Indian Removal Act.

== Brief history ==
On December 2, 1837, Colonel Zachary Taylor ordered the construction of Fort Gardiner during his Second Seminole War campaign as he marched his troops into the Lake Okeechobee region. Colonel Taylor determined that another fortification was required further south, so on December 21, 1837, he ordered another fortification constructed to support his plans. This particular fortification was named Fort Basinger after Lieutenant William E. Basinger who was killed during the Dade battle.

Colonel Taylor assigned Captain Monroe of the 4th Artillery in command of Fort Basinger and stationed one company of troops and approximately 85 sick men and some Indians at the fortification. Captain Monroe was also charged with finishing the construction of the blockhouses and stockades around Fort Basinger.

The remaining troops marched south from Fort Basinger and on December 25, 1837, they engaged in the Battle of Lake Okeechobee. Colonel Taylor’s detachment suffered 26 killed and 112 wounded and had to retreat back to Fort Basinger. After a short stay at Fort Basinger Colonel Taylor’s detachment made their way to Fort Gardiner, where they set up a makeshift hospital. A military escort accompanied many of the wounded soldiers to Fort Brooke for additional medical attention.

Fort Basinger survived the Second Seminole War and was used by U.S. Army troops and militiamen during the Third Seminole War (1855–1858). It was eventually abandoned at the end of the Third Seminole War and most likely eroded away.

== Fort Basinger’s Namesake: William Elon Basinger ==
William Elon Basinger was born on September 27, 1806, in Savannah, Georgia. He was the great-grandson of Peter Tondee (c. 1723 – 1775), who owned and operated Tondee’s Tavern in Savannah, where the first meetings of revolutionary sentiment were held in the Georgia Colony in 1770. Tondee’s Tavern became a hub for opposition to the British Empire’s control of the Thirteen American Colonies.

Basinger obtained an appointment as a U.S. Army cadet at the United States Military Academy in West Point, New York. He entered the United States Military Academy on July 1, 1826. While at the academy his roommate was Joseph E. Johnston and he was cadet sergeant-major under Cadet Adjutant Robert E. Lee. He graduated second in his class on July 1, 1830 without a single demerit. He was promoted to second lieutenant, 2nd Artillery on July 1, 1830.

In 1831, he served at the garrison at Fort Moultrie, and at the Augusta Arsenal. He returned to the United States Military Academy as an assistant instructor of infantry tactic from November 24, 1831 to December 19, 1833. From 1834 to 1835, he served at the garrison at Fort Jackson, Louisiana, and at Covington, Louisiana. In 1835, he was transferred to Tampa Bay to prepare for defenses against the uprising Seminole Indians and their allies.

On December 23, 1835, Brevet Major Francis Langhorne Dade led a detachment of eight officers, including Lt. Basinger, and 100 troops from Fort Brooke to Fort King. On December 28, 1835, this detachment was ambushed by a group of Seminole Indians led by Chief Micanopy, Ote Emathla (Jumper) and Halpatter Tustenuggee (Alligator) and their allies. Lt. Basinger was the last officer killed, and only two soldiers and their guide Luis Pacheco survived. This battle became known as Dade's Massacre, and it launched the Second Seminole War.

William Elon Basinger is buried in the St. Augustine National Cemetery in St. Augustine, Florida. During his burial ceremony Zachary Taylor said, “this day I bury an officer as dear to me as a son and by reason of his untimely death the United States has lost a soldier who would have become one of our great generals."

== Site of Fort Basinger ==
Today, no remnants of Fort Basinger exist, but its site is marked with a Florida Board of Parks and Historic Memorials sign in Highlands County, Florida. The sign reads, “Col. Zachary Taylor had Fort Basinger built in 1837, during the Seminole Wars, on the Kissimmee River 17 miles above its mouth. It was a small stockade which served as a temporary fort and supply station on the line of forts extending from Tampa to Lake Okeechobee. Named for Lt. William E. Basinger of the 2nd Artillery, who was killed in Dade’s Massacre. The fort was abandoned at the end of the Indian Wars.”
