= Fort Gardiner =

- Historically misspelled as Fort Gardner.
- Fort Gardiner was located on the Kissimmee River near the north bank of Kissimmee Lake in present-day Polk County, Florida. in United States
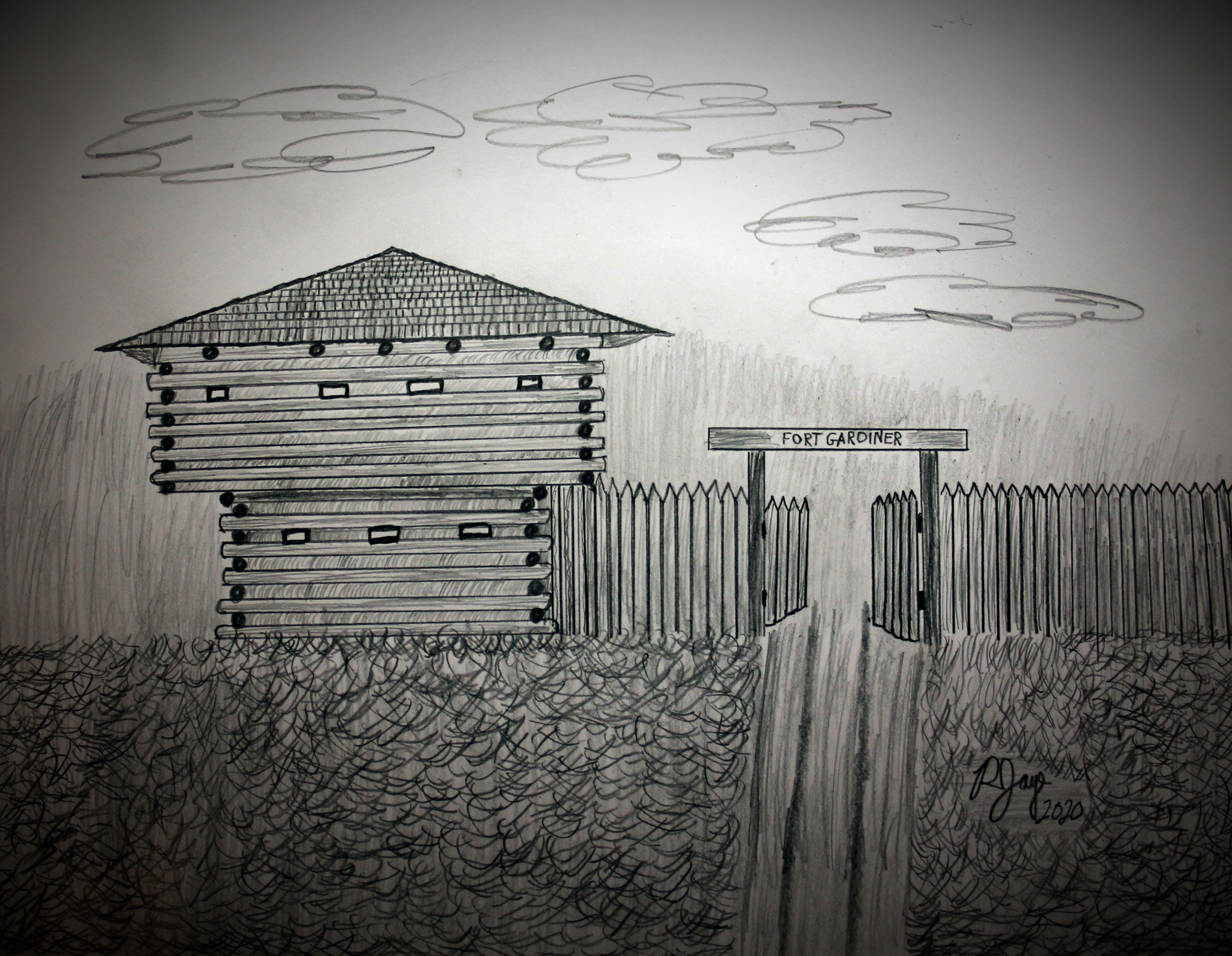
- Fort Gardiner - Second Seminole War Fort (artist's depiction).

Site information
- Condition: Completely destroyed.

Location
- Location of Fort Gardiner Fort Gardiner (the United States)
- Coordinates: 27°54′17″N 81°35′3″W

Site history
- Built: 1837
- Built by: United States Army
- In use: 1837-1842
- Materials: Pine log stockade and blockhouses.
- Fate: Abandoned in 1842 and burnt to the ground.
- Battles/wars: Battle of Lake Okeechobee
- Events: Fort Gardiner was built as a communications and supply garrison, but after the Battle of Okeechobee it was temporarily utilized as a hospital.

Garrison information
- Past commanders: Colonel Zachary Taylor
- Garrison: Regular army troops and militiamen.

Fort Gardiner was a stockaded fortification with two blockhouses that was built in 1837 by the United States Army. It was one of the military outposts created during the Second Seminole War to assist Colonel Zachary Taylor's troops to capture Seminole Indians and their allies in the central part of the Florida Territory that were resisting forced removal to federal territory west of the Mississippi River per the Indian Removal Act.

== Brief history ==
After Major General Thomas S. Jesup, Quartermaster General and Commander of all U.S. troops in Florida, had given up hope of bringing the Second Seminole War to an end by negotiation he ordered Colonel Taylor “to proceed with the least possible delay against any portion of the enemy and to destroy or capture the same.” On December 2, 1837, Colonel Zachary Taylor, commander of 1,400 troops of the First Infantry Regiment of the U.S. Army of the South, ordered the construction of a fortification on the banks of the Kissimmee River just south of Lake Tohopekaliga in the central part of the Florida Territory - present-day Polk County, Florida. This particular fortification was named Fort Gardiner after Captain George Washington Gardiner, who was killed on December 28, 1835 during the battle of Dade's Massacre in present-day Sumter County, Florida.

On December 19, 1837, Colonel Taylor marched south from Fort Gardiner with 1,032 soldiers (180 Missouri volunteers, 47 from the “Morgan Spies” company, 70 Delaware and Shawnee Indians and 735 regular U.S. Army troops) to join General Jesup’s campaign to penetrate deep into Seminole territory with large forces and trap the Seminoles and their allies and force them to fight or surrender. On December 21, 1837, Colonel Taylor ordered another fortification constructed to support his plans. This particular fortification was named Fort Basinger after Lieutenant William E. Basinger who was killed during the battle of Dade's Massacre. Colonel Taylor stationed one company of troops and approximately 85 sick men and some Indians at Fort Basinger. The remaining troops marched south and captured small parties of Indians as they surrendered.

Meanwhile, about 380 to 480 Seminole Indians and their allies led by Old Sam Jones, Alligator and Coacoochee were preparing a battleground to confront Colonel Taylor’s soldiers. On December 25, 1837, the Battle of Lake Okeechobee took place. It was a tactical victory for the Seminoles and their allies as the U.S. forces suffered 26 killed and 112 wounded compared to 11 killed and 14 wounded on the Seminole side. The Seminoles and their allies retreated, however Colonel Taylor could not pursue them as his forces sustained too many casualties. Colonel Taylor regrouped his soldiers and marched back to Fort Basinger and from there they proceeded to Fort Gardiner where they set up a makeshift hospital. Many of the wounded soldiers were then escorted to Fort Brooke for further care.

While at Fort Gardiner Colonel Taylor wrote a letter to Brigadier General Roger Jones in Washington, D.C. titled “Seminole Campaign, Official, Report of the Battle of Okeechobee, on the 25th December 1837” where he detailed his operations prior, during and after the battle, and praised his fallen men. The Battle of Lake Okeechobee led to the promotion of Zachary Taylor and was most likely his first step towards being elected the 12th President of the United States in 1849.

Fort Gardiner was abandoned at the end of the Second Seminole War in 1842, and most likely burnt to the ground.

== Fort Gardiner’s Namesake: George Washington Gardiner ==
George W. Gardiner was born around 1795 in Washington, District of Columbia. He was a U.S. Army cadet at the United States Military Academy in West Point, New York and graduated on March 11, 1812, and was promoted to Third Lieutenant, 1st Artillery. He served in the War of 1812 from 1814 to 1815 while stationed at the garrison at Ft. Columbus, New York, and from 1815 to 1816 while stationed in Portsmouth, NH. He was promoted to Second Lieutenant, 1st Artillery on May 1, 1814 and was transferred to the Corps of Artillery on May 1, 1814.

Gardiner returned to the United States Military Academy as an Adjutant from October 12, 1816 to September 15, 1817. He became the Commandant of Cadets from February 10, 1819 to March 9, 1820, and an Instructor of Infantry Tactics from September 15, 1817 to April 2, 1818. He was promoted to First Lieutenant, Corps of Artillery on April 20, 1818.

He served as First Lieutenant, 2nd Artillery at the garrison in New York Harbor in 1820, the garrison at Fort Mifflin from 1821 to 1824, Fort Delaware from 1824 to 1827, the Augusta Arsenal, Georgia from 1827 to 1830, in the Cherokee Nation from 1830 to 1831, the garrison at Marion, Florida from 1831 to 1832, the Augusta Arsenal, Georgia from 1832 to 1833, the Cherokee Nation in 1833, in garrison at Fort Mitchell, Alabama from 1833 to 1834, Fort Jackson, LA in from 1834 to 1835, Fort Pickens, FL in 1835. He was promoted to Brevet Captain on April 20, 1828 for Faithful Service Ten Years in one Grade.

Gardiner was killed during the battle of Dade's Massacre on December 28, 1835. He is buried in the St. Augustine National Cemetery in St. Augustine, Florida.

== Site of Fort Gardiner ==
Today, no remnants of Fort Gardiner exist, but its site is marked with a Florida Board of Parks and Historic Memorials sign at Camp Mack in Lake Wales, Florida. The sign reads, “South of this site, on the banks of the Kissimmee River, stood Fort Gardiner. This Second Seminole War army post was named for Captain George Washington Gardiner who died in the Dade Massacre in 1835. Established December 2, 1837 by Colonel Zachary Taylor on his march to the Battle of Okeechobee. Designated as the Headquarters, First Brigade, Army of South of the Withlocoochee. It was used as a supply depot and in 1838 by the Fourth and Sixth Infantry. Following the Battle of Okeechobee, the wounded were brought to this depot and sent forward to Tampa on January 1, 1838. The original marker designating this site was dedicated in 1968 and replaced in 2020 due to damage." In August 2020, the Historical Marker was relocated from the side of Camp Mack Road after it was damaged to Camp Mack, a Guy Harvey Lodge, Marina & RV Resort. The Marker is now on the Kissimmee River and very close to the actual site of the Fort. The Marker is part of the Camp Mack Heritage Trail which was developed by Camp Mack and the Polk County Historical Commission over a year in 2019/2020.

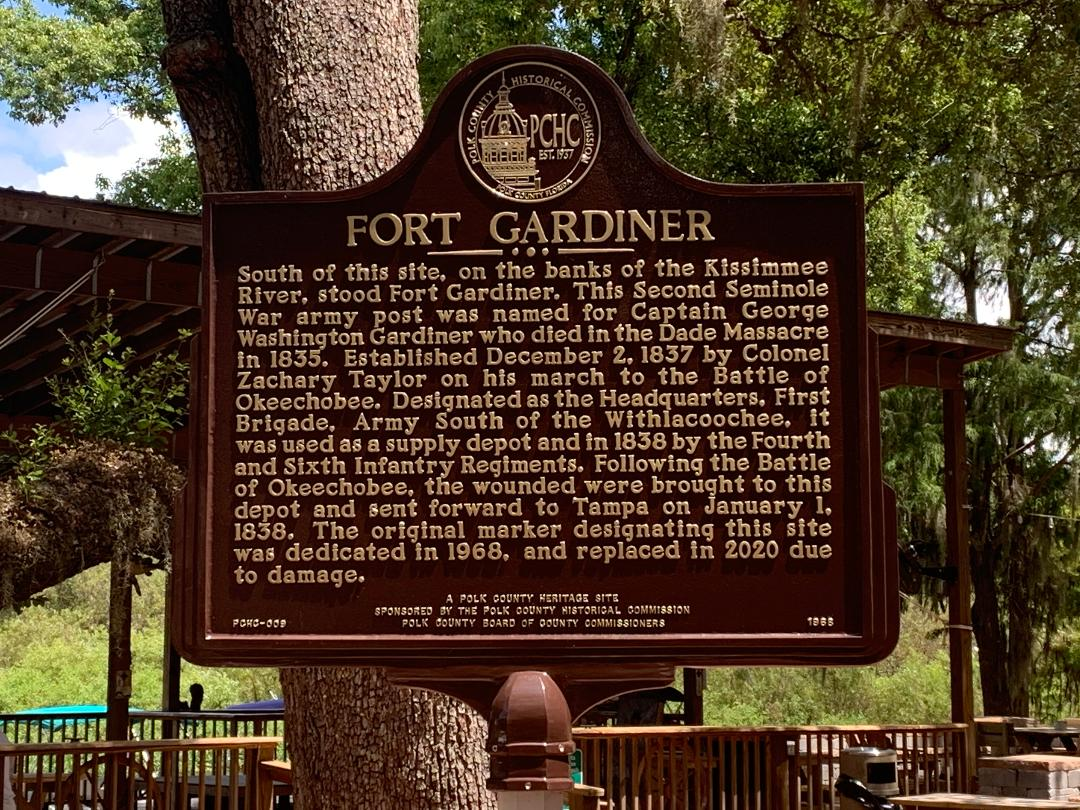
Fort Gardiner Historical Marker on the Camp Mack Heritage Trail
