= Chipco =

Seminole chief

- Cvpkē; Eco Emarv
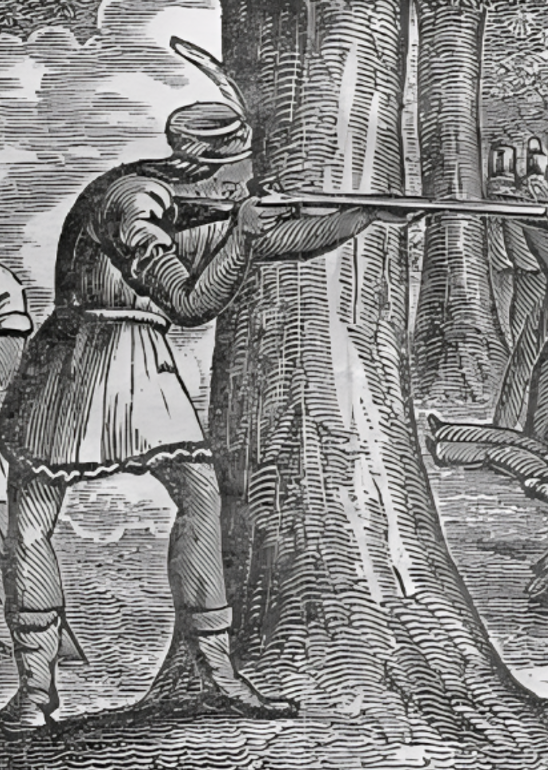
- A Seminole warrior aiming his rifle during the Second Seminole War. Chipco was one of these warriors.
- Born: c. 1805; Near Tallapoosa River, Alabama, United States
- Died: October 16, 1881 (aged 75-76); Lake Pierce, Florida, United States
- Military career
- Allegiance: Seminole
- Service years: 1835–1858
- Conflicts: Seminole Wars; Second Seminole War; Dade Battle; Third Seminole War

Chipco (Creek: Cvpkē), also known as Echo Emathla (Creek: Eco Emarv), (c. 1805-1881) was a 19th-century Muscogee chief and warrior. He was one of the most prominent leaders during the Seminole Wars, and by the end of the conflict he was the remaining leader of the Muscogee-speaking band of Seminoles in Florida. At a young age, Chipco and his family of Red Sticks fled as refugees to Spanish Florida because of the War of 1812, and the Creek War where they joined the Seminole tribe. As Chipco grew older he became a chief and eventually fought against the United States and its policy of Indian Removal. Chipco was one of the Seminole leaders at the Dade Battle, where Seminole warriors successfully ambushed a column of the U.S. Army and killed over 100 U.S. troops. This battle started the Second Seminole War, which Chipco would fight in through its entire duration. By the end of the Seminole Wars, Chipco and his band had successfully resisted the United States and were part of the group of Seminoles who remained in Florida, and they were the only Seminole band who continued living in Central Florida.

== Names ==
Chipco may also have been called "Echo Emathla Chopco", "Quatkaska", "Cli-so-to-kee-ti-ga", and "Tcup-ko". The name "Chipco" is derived from the Muscogee word Cvpkē meaning "tall" or "long". Eco means deer, while "Emathla" (Emarv) was a title bestowed on someone who had proved himself in battle, and had then become the leader of a band.

== Biography ==
Chipco was born around 1805 among the Upper Creeks of the Muscogee tribe who lived along the Tallapoosa River in Central Alabama. He was born into the Deer Clan through his mother's lineage. Chipco's family was part of the Red Sticks faction of the Muscogee. The Red Sticks were political traditionalists who militantly opposed both the United States and the adoption of White American cultural practices. The Red Sticks were opposed by the "National Creeks" faction of the Muscogee, who instead advocated for allying with the United States and assimilating into White American culture. The Red Sticks were defeated by the United States and the National Creeks in the War of 1812 and many of them fled south as refugees to Florida. Chipco was part of this wave of refugees at a young age, and after migrating to Florida they soon joined the Seminole tribe who were already living in the area.

During the First Seminole War in 1818, Chipco's father was killed by Andrew Jackson's troops at a Seminole village (Bolek's village aka Bowlegs Town) along the Suwannee River. His family then went further south and settled along the Peace River. Chipco then moved near Tampa Bay, where he would start visiting the newly constructed Fort Brooke to trade.

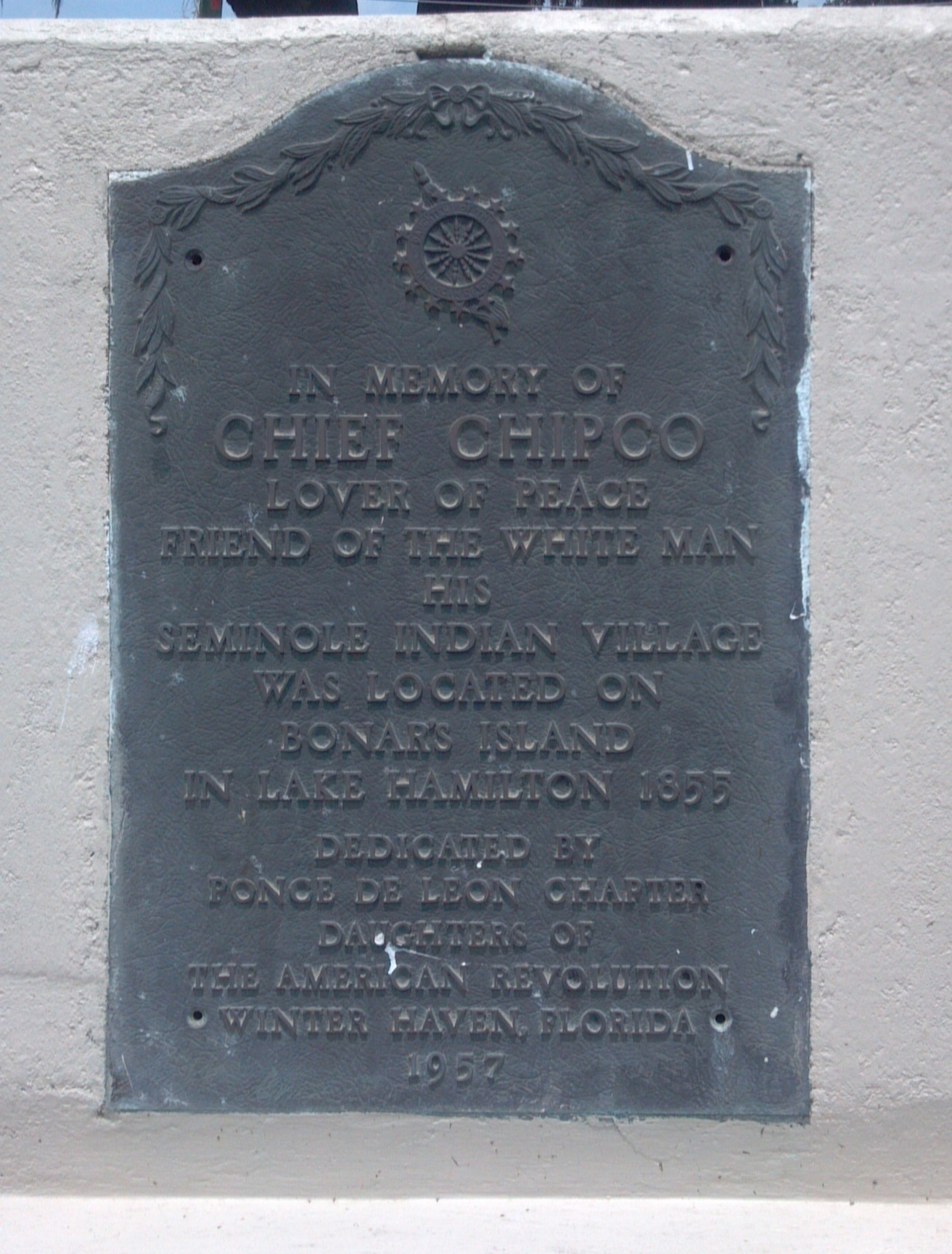
A memorial plaque dedicated to Chipco made by the Daughters of the American Revolution

Shortly before the Second Seminole War started, Chipco had risen to the position of chief among the Muscogee-speaking Seminoles. Around this time, President Andrew Jackson signed the Indian Removal Act, with the goal of ethnically cleansing the Seminoles from Florida. President Jackson also appointed Wiley Thompson, a former congressman from Georgia, to oversee the removal of the Seminoles from Florida. Chipco and many other prominent Mikasuki and Seminole leaders such as Abiaka and Osceola, staunchly opposed the Indian Removal policy.

Once it became clear that the Seminoles would not be removed without a fight, both sides made preparations for war. In December 1835 General Duncan Clinch ordered a column of U.S. Army troops to march from Fort Brooke up north to Fort King in order to strengthen Fort King's defenses against an impending Seminole attack. This column was led by Major Francis Dade and was made up of 110 soldiers and 1 six-pounder cannon. While marching north on December 28, 1835, the U.S. soldiers were ambushed by a force of Seminole warriors, which included Chief Chipco. The Seminoles wiped out the army column and killed nearly all the soldiers, including Major Dade. This would subsequently be known as the Dade Battle, and it would mark the start of the Second Seminole War. Chipco fought all throughout the Second Seminole War, and he was never killed or captured. Chipco would employ guerrilla warfare tactics by staying hidden in the wilderness and leading his warriors on raids. In 1839, Chipco led a raid on Fort Cummings near Lake Rochelle. During this raid, Chipco killed a U.S. Army sentry, scalped him, and took his gun. Chipco's last known location during the Second Seminole War before hostilities ended in 1842 was around Lake Istokpoga.

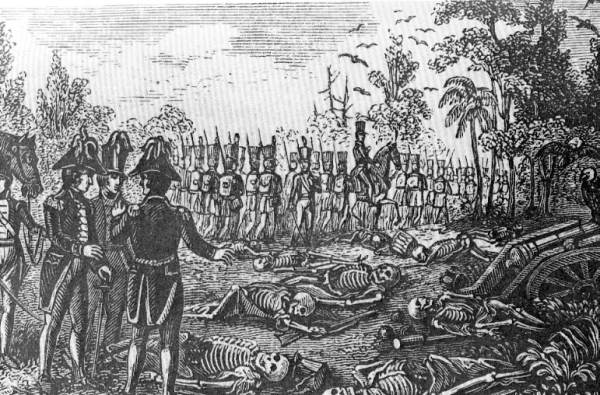
Chipco fought against the U.S. Army at the Dade Battle in 1835. This lithograph shows Edmund Gaines' men finding the fallen U.S. troops who were killed in the battle.

While a temporary peace had been achieved in Florida with the end of the Second Seminole War in 1842, tensions between Seminoles and White Floridians still remained. Even though the war was over, the U.S. Government still tried to get the Seminoles to leave Florida through negotiations and bribery. Chipco himself stated that he would never leave Florida, and he also boasted that he "didn't fear all the crackers in Florida". In 1849 two White men named George Payne and Dempsey Whidden were killed by Seminoles at the Kennedy-Darling Trading Post near Paynes Creek, and the trading post itself was burned down. (Note: Chipco had visited the store earlier on the day of that Payne and Whidden were killed, but Echo Emathla Chipco had a brother, Costa Fixico Chipco, and it is not clear which one had visited the trading post that day.) In 1850 a White orphan boy named Daniel Hubbard was killed by Seminoles in Marion County, and his killing was attributed to Chipco and his band. Hubbard's killers were identified as Pahosee, Chiffu-Yahlosehee, Kifsu Hadjo, members of Chipco's band. Chipco eventually agreed to turn over the three men to the US Army, and they were arrested at a trading post in Fort Myers on May 17, 1851. The arrested Seminoles claimed that they were innocent, and that the killers had actually been Chipco and three men from his band.

The U.S. Government made one final attempt to remove the Seminoles from Florida in 1855, which began the Third Seminole War. Immediately after this war began, Chipco's band of Muscogee-speakers started to raid areas in both southern and central Florida. In 1856 the raiders from Chipco's band attacked Whites in modern-day Hardee county, Manatee county, Lee County, Hendry County, Sarasota County, Hillsborough County, Pasco County, and Polk County. After initially going on the offensive, Chipco and his band then went south to hide in the Everglades, where he successfully avoided capture for the remainder of the war. In 1858 the Third Seminole War and the Seminole Wars as a whole finally ended as the United States gave up its attempts to remove the remaining Seminole bands in Florida.

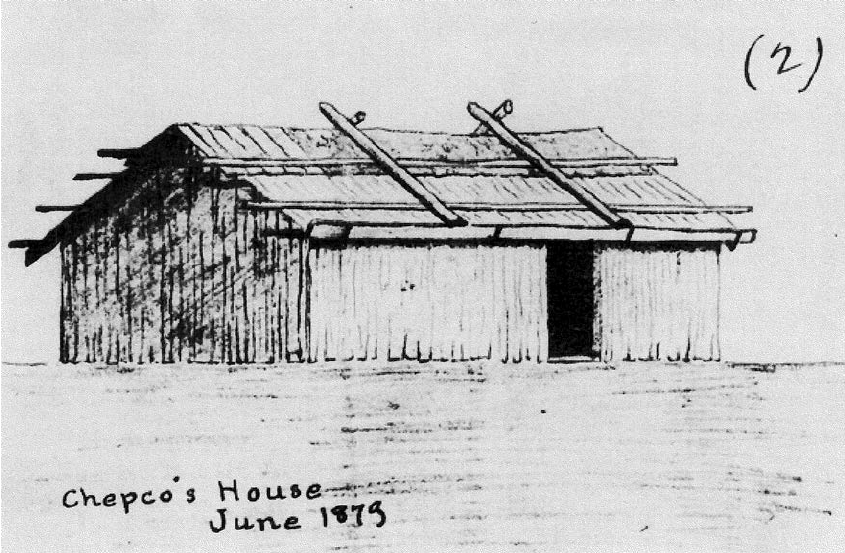
Chipco's home by Lake Pierce in 1879. Unlike most Seminoles who lived in thatched chickee huts at the time, Chipco lived in a log cabin.

After the Seminole Wars ended, Chipco and his band left the Everglades and moved back up north to live in Central Florida. Chipco's band subsequently set up a village near Lake Pierce in Polk County. The Seminoles who lived in Chipco's village farmed patches of corn, rice, sweet potatoes, pumpkins, sugarcane, melons, and tobacco. The Seminoles at Chipco's village also owned herds of pigs, cows, and horses. Despite his great hostility towards the White Floridians during the Seminole Wars, Chipco ended up having friendly relations with the White settlers in his old age. He continued traveling to Tampa to trade, and he would dine at the homes of White settlers. In 1879 Chipco's village was visited by U.S. Army officer Richard Henry Pratt. During his visit Pratt commented on how fertile the soil around the village was, and on the abundant amount of crops grown by Chipco's band. Pratt told Chipco that he had come to see what kind of help the government could give to his people, but Chipco dismissed any offers for help from the government, saying that he did not want to hear any "Washington talk". Shortly before his death, Chipco chose his nephew Tallahassee to be his successor as the leader of the Muscogee-speaking band of Seminoles. Chipco died at his Lake Pierce village on October 16, 1881. He was buried together with his Kentucky rifle at his funeral. His death was reported in many newspapers across the United States.

== Sources ==
- Covington, James W. (1993). The Seminoles of Florida. Gainesville, Florida: University Press of Florida. ISBN 978-1-947372-37-5.
- Hannel, Eric; Hannel, Karen (2019). "Amnesia, Anamnesis, and Myth-Making in Florida: A Case Study of Chipco". Florida Historical Quarterly. 98 (2).
- Knetsch, Joe; Missall, John; Missall, Mary Lou (2018). History of the Third Seminole War, 1849–1858. Havertown, Pennsylvania: Casemate Publishers. ISBN 978-1-61200-577-5.
