= Fort Fraser (Florida) =

Coordinates: 27.9476°N 81.866°W

Fort Fraser was a United States Army fortification constructed in November 1837 south of Lake Hancock between the modern cities of Lakeland and Bartow in Polk County, Florida. The fort's name was inspired by Upton S. Fraser, a captain in the U.S. Army who was killed by Seminoles in the Dade Massacre on December 28, 1835. Colonel Zachary Taylor, who later became the president of the United States, served at Fort Fraser as commander of two companies of the 1st U.S. Infantry. The fort was abandoned by the Army in May 1838, only to be informally used later as a shelter during the Crisis of 1849, Third Seminole War and the American Civil War.
