= St. Francis Barracks =

Coordinates: 29°53′16″N 81°18′35″W

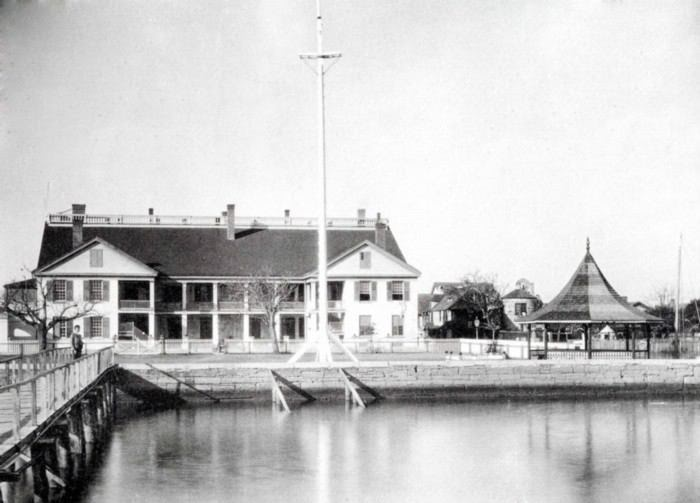
St. Francis Barracks as a U.S. Army installation (c. 1890)

St. Francis Barracks is a historic structure constructed of coquina stone located on Marine Street in St. Augustine, Florida, named in honor of St. Francis of Assisi. The barracks were constructed between 1724 and 1755 by friars of the Order of St. Francis, to replace a series of wooden buildings which had been destroyed by the ravages of the tropical climate in La Florida and by fire, both accidental fires and occasional intentional ones, such as when the city was razed by the English in 1702.

The barracks were turned into a military structure by the British in 1763, after Florida became a British possession at the conclusion of the French and Indian War. At that time, the Franciscan friars vacated St. Augustine, along with a majority of the other Spanish residents.

The name St. Francis Barracks also came to be applied to the larger military reservation which developed around the barracks on the shore of the Matanzas River. There are several additional historic structures, to include senior military officer housing and The King's Bakery, the latter being the only extant structure in St. Augustine constructed entirely within the twenty-year period of the British occupation.

Today the St. Francis Barracks is a U.S. military installation that is also known as the Florida State Arsenal and serves as the headquarters for the Florida National Guard and its two subordinate organizations, the Florida Army National Guard and the Florida Air National Guard. A portion of the military reservation is also the site of the St. Augustine National Cemetery.

== History ==
=== Spanish (1st and 2nd) and British periods ===
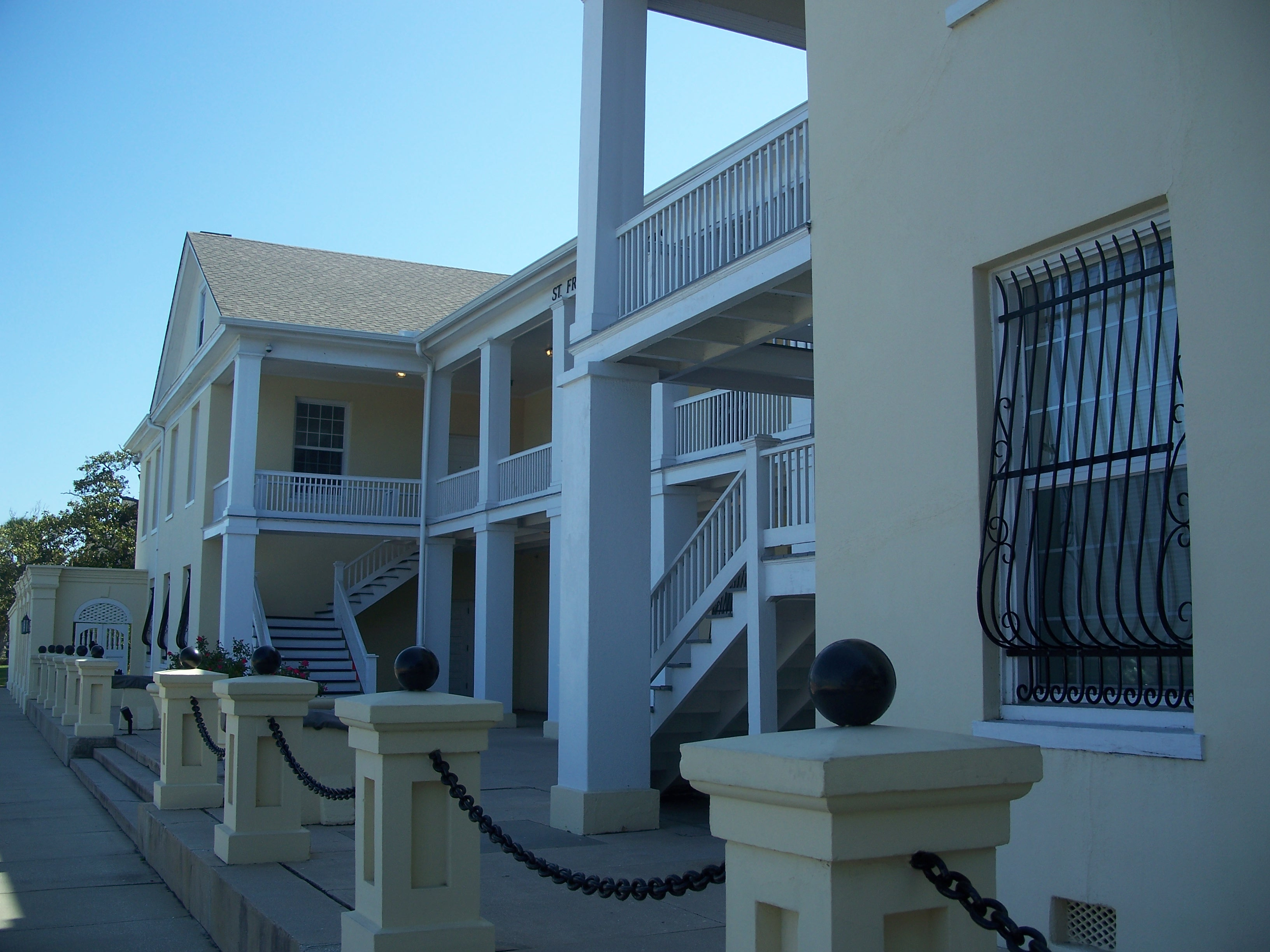
Modern view of St. Francis Barracks

When Pedro Menéndez de Avilés founded St. Augustine for the Spanish Crown, Jesuit priests were among the initial colonists to provide for the spiritual needs of the settlers and to help convert the native Timucua Indians to Christianity. In the 1570s the Jesuits were replaced by friars of the Order of St. Francis who were allocated land in 1588 at the southern end of the city for their monastery and church, Nuestra Senora de la Concepcion (Our Lady of the Conception).

The original structures on the site were built of logs and palm thatch roofs. Throughout the years a succession of buildings were constructed as replacements. The structures were susceptible to rotting in the humid sub-tropical climate and were highly flammable. In 1702 all the structures in St. Augustine with the exception of the Castillo de San Marcos were burned to the ground following the siege by Carolina Governor James Moore. After this, it was decided to rebuild the monastery with the same durable coquina used in the construction of the fort. Construction finally began in 1735 using coquina stone quarried at the King's Quarry located on Anastasia Island across Matanzas Bay from St. Augustine.

The Franciscan friars lived at the monastery until the British took possession of Florida in exchange for occupied Havana which they seized from the Spanish in the French and Indian War.

Almost the entire population of Catholic St. Augustine left the city upon the British taking control in 1763 including the Franciscan friars and many of their Native American converts. The British, a large majority of whom were Protestant converted the friars former living quarters into military barracks for the troops stationed at the newly christened Fort St. Marks, the anglicized version of the Castillo de San Marco.

During the British period of occupation, the military constructed an additional wooden barracks behind the coquina stone, St. Francis Barracks. They also constructed The King's Bakery, a coquina stone structure used for baking the bread for the city's garrison. This structure, which has been used as a garage by the Florida National Guard since 1930, is located perpendicular to the barracks across Marine Street. It is believed to be the only structure surviving in St. Augustine built entirely during the British Period (1763–1784).

After signing the Treaty of Paris, the British who conceded defeat in the American Revolution agreed to relinquish control of the Florida Territory, restoring Spain's possession of the land. Upon returning the Spanish military continued to use the St. Francis Barracks, as a military installation and troop barracks. During this period known as the Second Spanish Period (1763–1821) the wooden barracks built by the British were torn down.

=== U.S. period / U.S. military installation ===
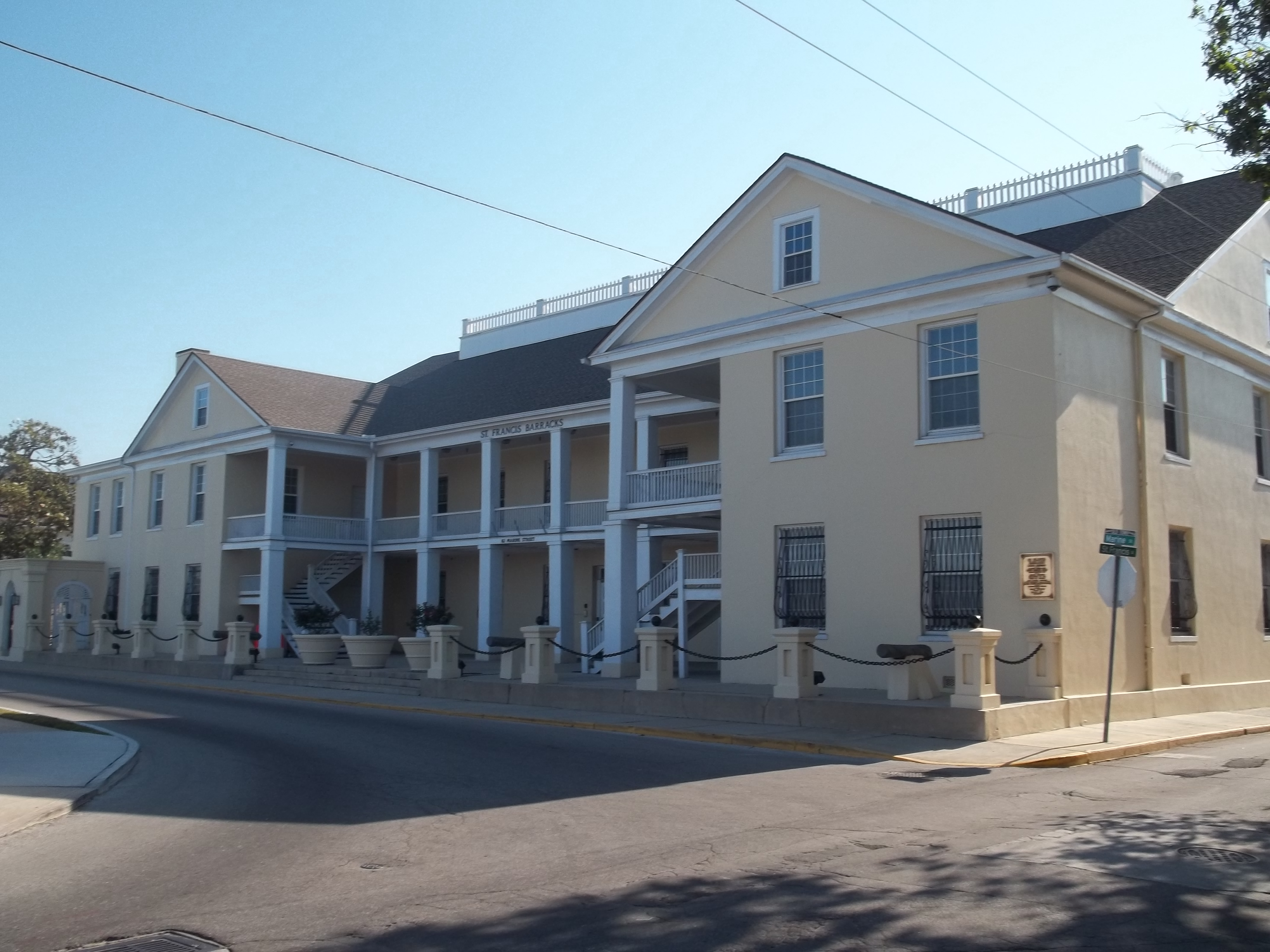

St. Francis Barracks came under control of the United States Army when the United States gained possession of Florida in 1821. The Barracks would remain an active U.S. Army installation until it was deactivated in 1900, with the exception of one year between 1861 and 1862 when it, like the rest of St. Augustine was under control of the Confederate States of America.

In 1828, a portion of the southern end of the St. Francis Barracks military reservation was set aside as a post cemetery. In 1842, the U.S. Army soldiers who perished in the 1835 Dade Massacre in present-day Sumter County, Florida, were re-interred here under 3 coquina pyramid shaped monuments. Over 1,300 other U.S. casualties of the Second Seminole War would later be buried here. This cemetery would later be redesignated the St. Augustine National Cemetery and would contain U.S. military personnel from the American Civil War, the Spanish–American War, World War I and World War II, as well as ten British and British Commonwealth military personnel from World War II before it was closed to further interments.

At the start of the Civil War, there was only one U.S. Army ordnance sergeant on duty at St. Francis Barracks, Sergeant Henry Douglas, who was responsible not only for the Barracks but also for nearby Fort Marion (the American name for Castillo de San Marcos). On January 7, 1861, before Florida's formal secession from the Union, members of a newly formed local militia unit named the St. Augustine Blues went to the St. Francis Barracks to demand the keys to the fort. The U.S. Army sergeant complied with the stipulation that he receive a receipt for the fort, which he was given.

SGT Douglas would later report that, "All military stores at this place were seized this morning by order of the Governor of the State of Florida. A company of volunteer soldiers marched to the barracks and took possession of me, and demanded peaceable possession of the keys of the fort and magazine."

The U.S. Army deactivated Fort Marion and St. Francis Barracks in 1900 and leased the Barracks to the Florida State Troops, the forerunner of the present day Florida National Guard, in 1907. St. Francis Barracks was formally given to the State of Florida for use as the State Arsenal in 1921 by an act of Congress. After receiving use of the Barracks via lease in 1907, the buildings were not immediately occupied. In 1915, St. Francis Barracks was gutted in a fire, however, the original coquina stone walls remained standing. The building was rebuilt in 1922 using the original walls.

Today, St. Francis Barracks, also known as the State Arsenal, is home to the Headquarters, Florida National Guard, headed by the Army or Air Force officer serving as The Adjutant General (TAG) of Florida, and the TAG's associated staff. It is also serves as the organizational headquarters for the Florida Army National Guard and the Florida Air National Guard, headed by the Assistant Adjutant General – Army (ATAG – Army) and the Assistant Adjutant General – Air Force (ATAG – Air), respectively, and their associated staffs.

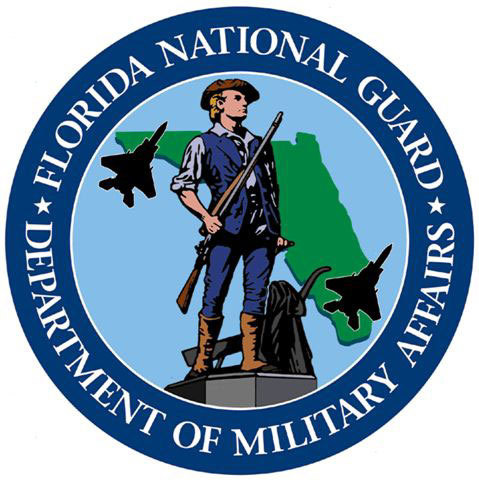
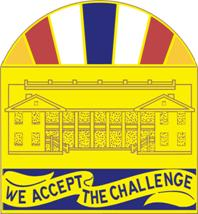
