= The King's Bakery =

Buildings and structures in St. Augustine, Florida

Coordinates: 29°53′12.1″N 81°18′33.4″W

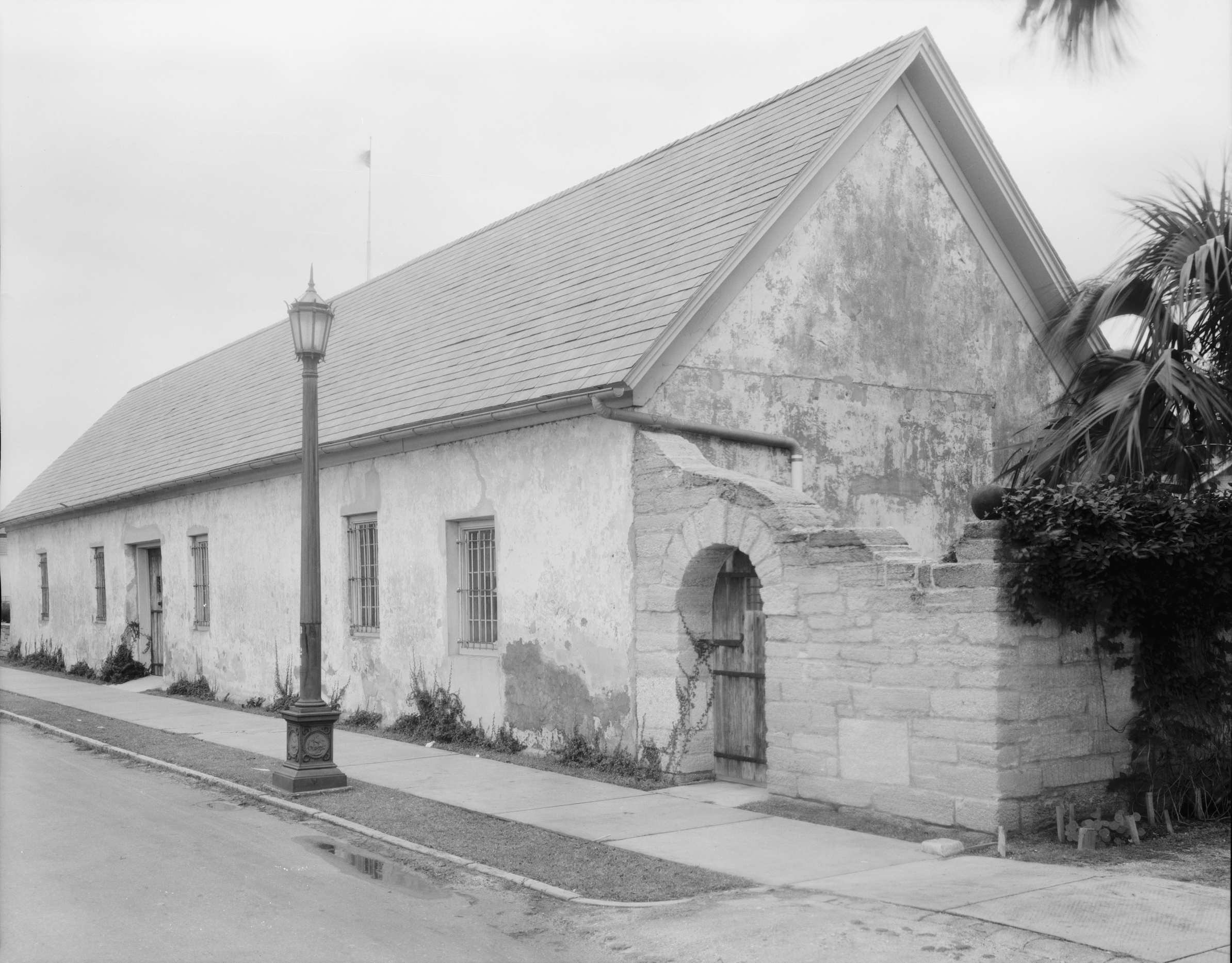
The King's Bakery, 1936 or 1937

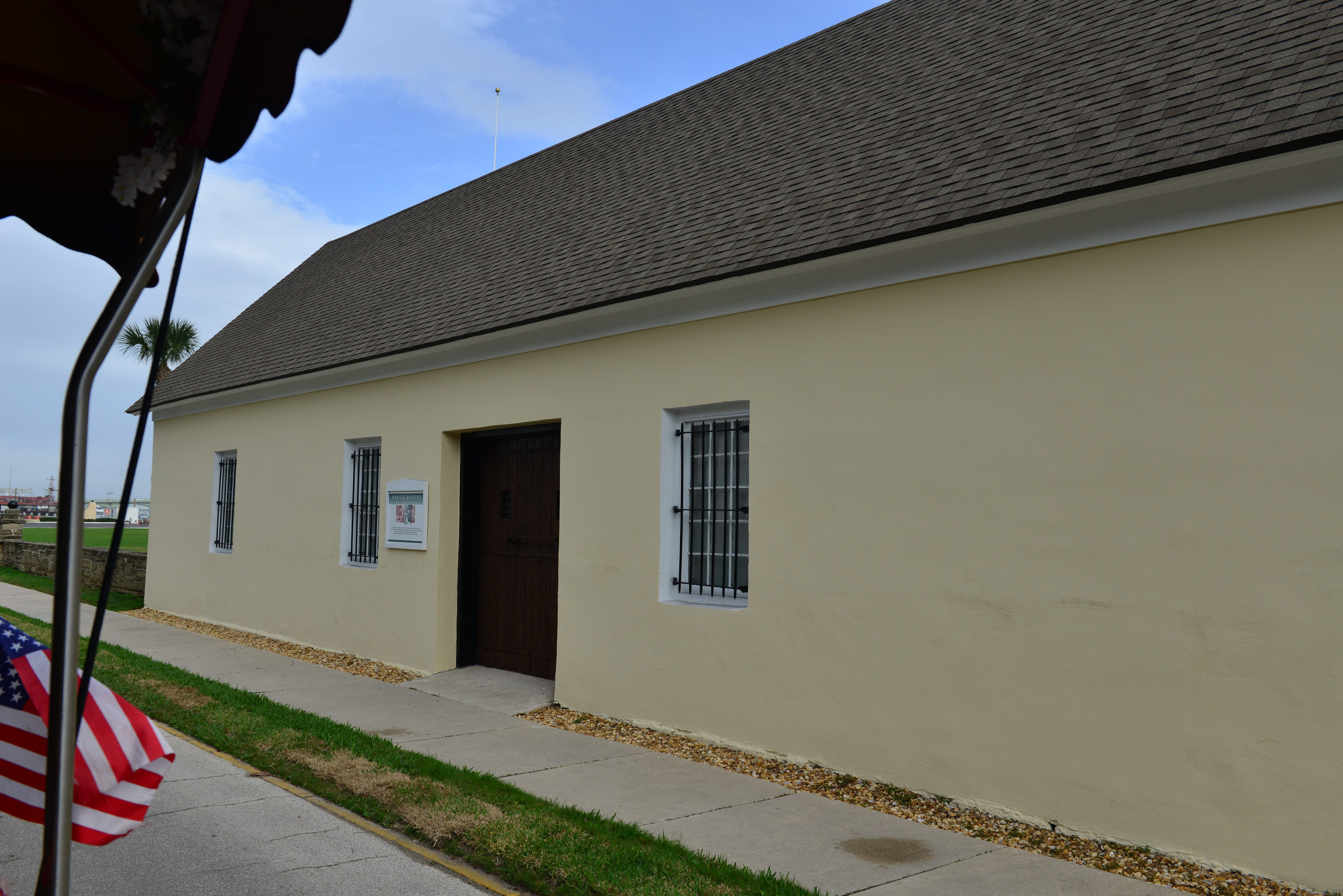
The King's Bakery, December 2012

The King's Bakery is a coquina stone structure in St. Augustine, Florida, built during the British colonial period in the state (1763–1783). The building, located on Marine Street, with the rear facing Matanzas Bay, was constructed to supply bread to the British troops quartered across the street at the St. Francis Barracks, a building which formerly housed Franciscan friars, during the First Spanish Period (1565–1763). The monastery was used by the British as military barracks.

The bakery, believed to be the only structure remaining in St. Augustine built entirely during the British period, has been used since then as a storeroom for flour, a military hospital, and offices.

The old bakery building is part of the St. Francis Barracks military compound, which since 1907 has served as the headquarters of the Florida National Guard. In 1934 it was converted for use as a garage.
