= Upton S. Fraser =

United States Army officer (1794–1835)

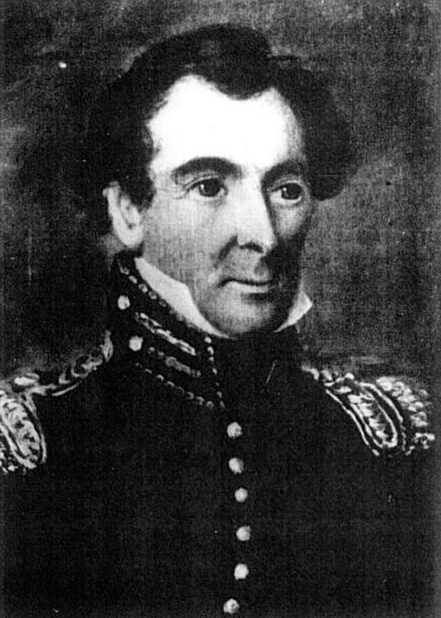
- Born: c. 1794; New York City, United States
- Died: December 28, 1835 (aged 41); Sumter County, Florida, United States
- Burial place: Barrancas National Cemetery
- Military career
- Allegiance: United States
- Branch: United States Army
- Service years: 1814–1835
- Rank: Captain
- Unit: 3rd Artillery Regiment
- Commands: Fort Brooke
- Conflicts: War of 1812; Black Hawk War; Second Seminole War; Dade Battle †

Upton Sinclair Fraser (c. 1794 – December 28, 1835) was an American military officer in the United States Army who served in multiple early 19th-century conflicts and was killed during the Second Seminole War. He was part of the advance guard of the Army column commanded by Major Francis L. Dade and was among the first officers killed in the Dade Battle.

== Early life ==
Fraser was born in New York City around 1794. Little is documented about his early life beyond his place and approximate year of birth, though records show he entered military service at a young age. According to archival military sources, Fraser began his Army career during the late stages of the War of 1812.

== Military career ==
In May 1814, during the War of 1812, Fraser joined the United States Army as an ensign with the 15th Infantry Regiment. Shortly after the war, he was transferred to the Artillery Corps in 1815 and later assigned to the newly formed 3rd Artillery Regiment.

Fraser rose through the ranks over the next decade and was promoted to captain in 1828. In 1832, he and his unit were deployed to Illinois during the Black Hawk War, a conflict between the United States and Native American tribes led by Black Hawk.

By 1834, Fraser's artillery company was posted to Florida in anticipation of rising tensions with Seminole groups. He was appointed commander of Fort Brooke near present-day Tampa Bay, where he helped fortify the post in preparation for hostilities that became known as the Second Seminole War.

== Death at the Dade Battle ==
In December 1835, an Army column of approximately 110 soldiers, including Captain Fraser, set out from Fort Brooke under the command of Major Francis L. Dade to reinforce U.S. positions inland. Fraser was part of the advanced guard.

On December 28, 1835, Seminole warriors ambushed the column in what became known as the Dade Battle or Dade Massacre. Captain Fraser was amongst the first officers struck down at the start of the engagement, along with Major Dade and other members of the advance guard. The battle marked a significant early engagement of the Second Seminole War and resulted in heavy U.S. casualties.

== Legacy ==
After the end of the Second Seminole War, Fraser's remains were reinterred at Fort Brooke and later moved to Barrancas National Cemetery in Pensacola, Florida. Unlike many of Dade's men, whose remains were buried elsewhere, Fraser is buried in the national cemetery there. His service and death were documented in military histories of the era.

The U.S. Army fortification known as Fort Fraser was named in his honor when it was constructed near Lake Hancock in 1837. The fort served as a supply depot during the Seminole conflicts, though it was abandoned in 1838.

Historical sites at the Dade Battlefield State Historic Site include markers indicating where Captain Fraser fell during the battle.
