= George W. Gardiner =

United States Army officer who was killed by Seminole Indians at the 1835 Dade Battle

George Gardiner
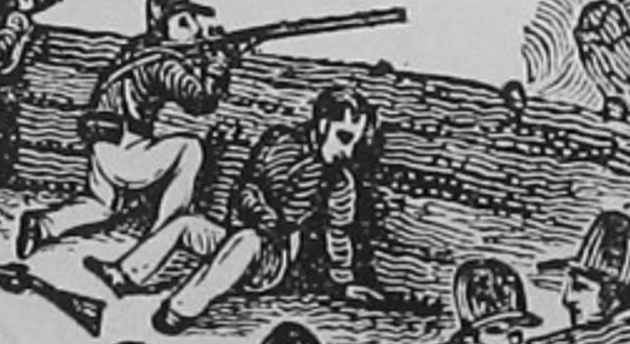
- A soldier in the stockade during Gardiner's last stand
- Born: c. 1795; Washington D.C., United States
- Died: December 28, 1835 (aged 40); Sumter County, Florida, United States
- Burial place: St. Augustine National Cemetery
- Education: West Point Military Academy
- Spouse: Frances Fowler
- Military career
- Allegiance: United States
- Branch: United States Army
- Service years: 1814–1835
- Rank: Captain
- Unit: 2nd Artillery Regiment
- Conflicts: War of 1812; Second Seminole War; Dade Battle †

George Washington Gardiner (1795–1835) was a United States Army officer who was killed by Seminole Indians at the Dade Battle in 1835. After Major Francis Dade and most of his troops were killed in the initial ambush, Gardiner took command of the remaining troops for the rest of the battle.

Gardiner was also the first Commandant of Cadets at West Point.

== Biography ==
George W. Gardiner was born in Washington, D.C. in 1795. He was born into an affluent family, and his father was a lawyer. In September 1812, he enrolled in the United States Military Academy at West Point. Gardiner excelled as a cadet, and he graduated in first place in his class in 1814. After he graduated from West Point, he was assigned as a Lieutenant in the U.S. Army Artillery Corps. Gardiner was then stationed at Fort Jay during the final months of the War of 1812.

In 1816, Gardiner returned to West Point as an instructor, where he taught infantry tactics and artillery tactics to cadets. He was also appointed as the Commandant of Cadets by Superintendent Sylvanus Thayer in 1817, being the first to hold the position. Gardiner was transferred to the 2nd Artillery Regiment in 1821 during a large reorganization of the United States Army. He was then assigned to garrison duty at various military forts throughout the United States. In 1828, he was promoted to Captain while he was stationed at the Augusta Arsenal in Georgia.

Captain Gardiner and his company were sent to Fort Pickens in Florida in early 1835. As was common at the time, Gardiner and his men served as "red-legged infantry", which were artillery troops trained to fight as infantry. Gardiner was stationed at Fort Pickens until late 1835, when tensions rose between the Seminole Indians and the United States over the Indian Removal Act. Because of these tensions, Gardiner and his men were sent to Fort Brooke in November 1835. General Duncan Clinch had ordered a U.S. Army column to assemble at Fort Brooke and then march up north to Fort King to prepare for an impending conflict with the Seminoles. Captain Gardiner was originally supposed to be the commander of this column, but he was suddenly informed that his wife Frances Fowler was gravely ill, so he quickly left to attend to her. Because of Gardiner's absence, Major Francis Dade was sent from Key West to Fort Brooke to take command of the Army column in December 1835. After attending to his wife, Gardiner managed to rejoin the column at the last moment before it began marching north, but he was now subordinate to Major Dade.

As the U.S. Army column marched northward through Central Florida, it was ambushed by the Seminole Indians on December 28, 1835, an ambush that would later be known as the Dade battle. During the first volley of fire from the Seminoles, Major Francis Dade and the majority of the U.S. troops were killed. The Seminoles erroneously believed that they had killed all of the U.S. troops in the initial ambush, and temporarily left the battlefield. However, a few dozen soldiers managed to survive the initial ambush, and Captain Gardiner was the highest-ranking officer among them. Gardiner used this lull in the fighting to order his men to quickly build a small triangular stockade, and for them to bring their six-pounder cannon to defend it. The Seminoles soon returned to the battlefield and attacked the remaining U.S. troops, who had positioned themselves in the stockade with their cannon. As they were being fired upon again by the Seminoles, Gardiner attempted to rally his men by standing up and swinging his artillery sword in the air while yelling orders at them. Whenever the Seminoles shot down the soldiers manning the cannon, Gardiner would order a new group of his soldiers to take their place and to keep firing the cannon. Because Gardiner's men were under intense rifle fire from the Seminole Indians, they were unable to properly aim the cannon, and most of the cannon shots were fired harmlessly up into the trees without hitting anyone. Captain Gardiner was eventually killed after being shot 6 times by the Seminoles, and the remaining U.S. troops were then killed as well.

== Legacy ==
George W. Gardiner was the namesake of Fort Gardiner, a U.S. military fort built in Polk County in 1837. Fort Gardiner was used as a staging area for Zachary Taylor's troops before the Battle of Lake Okeechobee.

George W. Gardiner had a son born in 1834 named George Fowler Gardiner, who served as a Lieutenant Colonel in the Union Army during the American Civil War.
