= John McNeil Jr. =

United States Army general

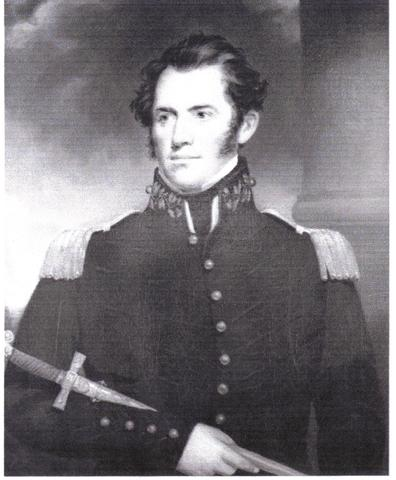
- Portrait on display at the New Hampshire State House. Painted by Henry Willard, and donated by McNeil's daughters
- Born: March 25, 1784; Hillsborough, New Hampshire, US
- Died: February 23, 1850 (aged 65); Washington, D.C., US
- Burial place: Congressional Cemetery
- Relatives: Benjamin Pierce (father in law); Franklin Pierce (brother in law); Benjamin Kendrick Pierce (brother in law)
- Military career
- Allegiance: United States
- Branch: United States Army
- Service years: 1807–1830
- Rank: Colonel (actual); Brigadier General (brevet)
- Units: 11th U.S. Infantry; 1st U.S. Infantry
- Commands: 1st U.S. Infantry
- Conflicts: War of 1812: Battle of Crysler's Farm; Second Battle of Lacolle Mills; Raid on Port Dover; Capture of Fort Erie; Battle of Chippewa; Battle of Lundy's Lane
- Other work: Surveyor of the Port of Boston

John McNeil Jr. (March 25, 1784 – February 23, 1850) was an officer in the United States Army. He distinguished himself in leading the bayonet charge which secured victory in the Battle of Chippewa. For his conduct in this battle, and in that of the Battle of Bridgewater, where he was severely wounded, he was successively brevetted as lieutenant colonel and colonel. In 1824 he received the brevet rank of brigadier general in recognition of his superior service as a brevet colonel for 10 years. He later received appointment as Surveyor of the Port of Boston, a post he held from 1830 to 1841. The husband of Elizabeth Andrews Pierce, son-in-law of Governor Benjamin Pierce, and brother-in-law of President Franklin Pierce, after retiring McNeil lived at the Pierce family home in Hillsborough, New Hampshire. He died in Washington, D.C., on February 23, 1850, and was buried at Congressional Cemetery in Washington.

== War of 1812 ==
He was born Hillsborough, New Hampshire. McNeil was educated in Hillsborough, served in the New Hampshire militia from 1801 to 1812, and attained the rank of captain. He entered the United States Army as a captain in the 11th U.S. Infantry regiment on March 12, 1812. He was appointed major on August 15, 1813.

=== Battle of Chippawa ===
General Winfield Scott having given the necessary orders, cried out to the battalion of Major McNeil—the 11th infantry, which had not a recruit in it—on the left,— " The enemy say we are good at long shot, but cannot stand the cold iron! I call upon the Eleventh instantly to give the lie to that slander !"—" Charge!" he added, as the shot from Towson's guns ploughed through and through the British ranks. " Charge !—Charge!" he repeated in thundering tones, rising up in his stirrups, and waving his men on with his sword.

This masterly charge, so well conceived and executed, put an end to the contest. The front lines of the enemy staggered, and rolled back in a confused mass on the reserve. All caught the infection of defeat, and the slope leading down to the Chippewa was soon darkened by a cloud of fugitives. The pursuit was ordered, but was checked when the Americans reached the stream, by the hostile batteries that frowned on the opposite shore.

General Scott and his men held their ground manfully, till the arrival of General Brown, who had hurried forward with his suite, in advance of the brigades of Generals Ripley and Porter, as soon as the firing was heard. Meanwhile, the 11th and 22nd infantry, under Colonel Brady and Major John McNeil Jr., both of whom were severely wounded, having expended their ammunition, were withdrawn from action, and the whole brunt of the battle in front, was sustained by the 9th infantry, commanded by Major Leavenworth.

Major General Jacob Brown's Report To The Secretary Of War, July 7, 1814:

"...I cannot deprive myself of the pleasure of saying that... Major McNeil the 11th. Col. Campbell [of the 11th] was wounded early in the action, gallantly leading on his regiment."

He was brevetted lieutenant colonel for the Battle of Chippawa July 5, 1814.

=== Battle of Lundy's Lane ===
For the Battle of Lundy's Lane July 25, 1814, in which his leg was severely wounded, he was brevetted Colonel.

== Post-war service ==
McNeil was promoted to Lieutenant Colonel 1st U.S. Infantry on February 24, 1818. He received the brevet of Brigadier General on July 25, 1824, to recognize 10 years of superior service as a brevet colonel. he was promoted to the permanent rank of Colonel as commander of the 1st U. S. Infantry on April 28, 1826.

== Post-military career ==
He was appointed Surveyor of the Port of Boston in 1829 and resigned his Army commission on April 23, 1830. McNeil was a Democrat, and held his patronage appointment until 1841, when he was replaced as a result of the Whig victory in the 1840 presidential election.

McNeil later resided at the Pierce family home in Hillsborough, and was active in Democratic Party politics.

He died in Washington, D.C., February 23, 1850, and was buried in Washington's Congressional Cemetery.

== Family ==
In 1811 McNeil married Elizabeth Andrews Pierce (1788–1855), the daughter of Governor Benjamin Pierce and his first wife. Elizabeth A. Pierce was the half-sister of President Franklin Pierce and Colonel Benjamin Kendrick Pierce.

The children of John McNeil Jr. and Elizabeth Andrews Pierce included:

- John Winfield Scott McNeil (1817–1837), an Army First Lieutenant who was killed in action during the Second Seminole War.
- Frances Maria McNeil (c.1818–1892), the wife of New Hampshire Judge Chandler Eastman Potter.
- Benjamin Pierce McNeil (1825–1853), who studied law in New Hampshire and served as an officer in the New Hampshire Militia before joining the Army. He died in Boston while serving as a First Lieutenant in the 3rd U.S. Artillery.
- Elizabeth A. McNeil (1820–1915), the wife of Brigadier General Henry Washington Benham.
