= John Charles Casey =

American military officer (1809–1856)

John Charles Casey (1809 – December 25, 1856) was an American military officer, professor, and Indian Affairs official. He was involved in the removal of Seminoles from Florida. Casey Key is named for him. Fort Casey was named for him.

Casey was born in England in 1809. He was in the United States Military Academy at West Point, New York class of 1829. He served U.S. president Zachary Taylor in Mexico.

Sometime in the early 1830s, Casey was leased the services of an educated slave named Luis Pacheco who served as an interpreter for the military in the campaign against the Seminole.

Jefferson Davis lauded him and his service. Charles H. Coe wrote about him as "the Seminoles' Friend".

The National Museum of the American Indian in Washington, D.C. holds his letterbooks. The Gilcrease Museum in Tulsa, Oklahoma has a collection of his papers.

== See also ==
- Francis L. Dade
- Fort Brooke
- Seminole Wars
- Indian Removal
