= John Winfield Scott McNeil =

American soldier (1817–1837)

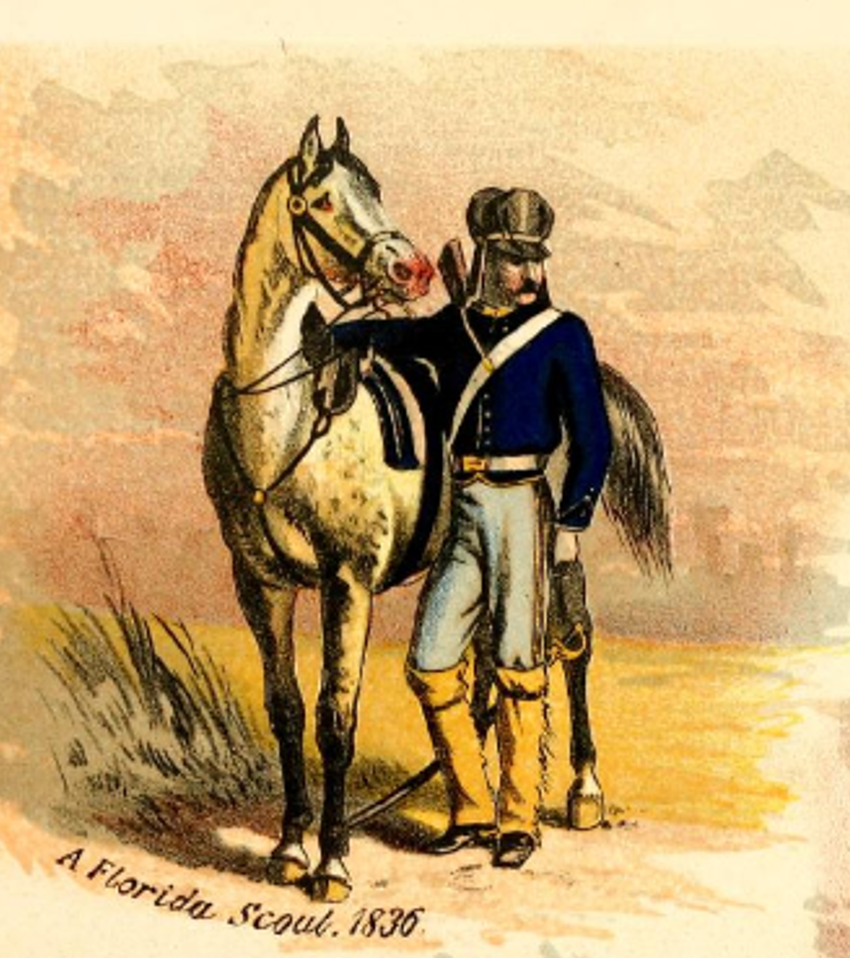
- A soldier of the 2nd Dragoons, McNeil's unit, in Florida during the Seminole Wars
- Born: February 17, 1817; Fort Mackinac, Michigan, United States
- Died: September 11, 1837 (aged 20); Near Mosquito Inlet, Florida, United States
- Burial place: St. Augustine National Cemetery
- Alma mater: West Point Military Academy
- Relatives: John McNeil Jr. (father); Franklin Pierce (uncle)
- Military career
- Allegiance: United States
- Branch: United States Army
- Service years: 1836 - 1837
- Rank: First Lieutenant
- Unit: 2nd Cavalry Regiment
- Conflicts: Second Seminole War †

John Winfield Scott McNeil (February 17, 1817 – September 11, 1837) was an American soldier. He was killed while fighting Seminole in Florida in 1837. He was the nephew of U.S. president Franklin Pierce.

John Winfield Scott McNeil was born in 1817 at Fort Mackinac, Michigan Territory. His father, General John McNeil Jr., was stationed at the fort at the time of his birth. His mother Elizabeth Pierce was the sister of Franklin Pierce, who would become the 14th president of the United States. His parents gave him his middle name in honor of General Winfield Scott. Shortly after his birth, his family moved to Chicago after his father was put in charge of Fort Dearborn. In 1824 his family moved back to their home town of Hillsborough in New Hampshire. While in Hillsborough, McNeil studied law under the tutelage of his uncle Franklin Pierce. Later, in 1834, McNeil enrolled in the West Point Military Academy. He graduated early and was commissioned as a First Lieutenant in the newly formed 2nd Cavalry Regiment in 1836. In the summer of 1836 he was tasked with recruiting duty in Carbondale, Pennsylvania. However, because of the ongoing Second Seminole War, McNeil was later sent to Florida to fight against the Seminole tribe who were resisting Indian Removal.

After arriving in Florida, McNeil and his unit were stationed at Fort Picolata, where they were put under the command of General Joseph Marion Hernández. During this time, the U.S. Army began to target a group of Miccosukee-Seminole villages in Volusia County. This group of villages was an important target for the U.S. Army as a number of important Seminole chiefs resided in the area, most notably Ee-mat-la, known as King Philip. In 1837, McNeil and his unit were tasked with attacking one of the villages. A Seminole defector named Tomoka John was attached to McNeil's unit as their Indian guide. On September 10, 1837, Tomoka John led Lieutenant McNeil and his soldiers to a hostile Miccosukee village near Mosquito Inlet. The village was surrounded by a dense terrain of bushes, so McNeil and his unit had to crawl on the ground through the bushes as they approached the village. Once they got past the bushes, McNeil led his soldiers as they charged towards the village. As McNeil charged ahead, he was spotted by Seminole chief Uchee Billy, who raised his rifle at McNeil. McNeil noticed Uchee Billy and tried to raise his pistol, but Uchee Billy fired first and shot McNeil in the stomach. After being wounded, McNeil was carried away on a litter while the other soldiers captured the Seminoles in the village. McNeil died of his bullet wound the next day on September 11, 1837, during his unit's march back to St. Augustine. McNeil was the first officer of the 2nd Cavalry Regiment to be killed in action. His body was buried at St. Augustine National Cemetery.
