= Lake Pierce (Polk County, Florida) =

Lake in the state of Florida, United States

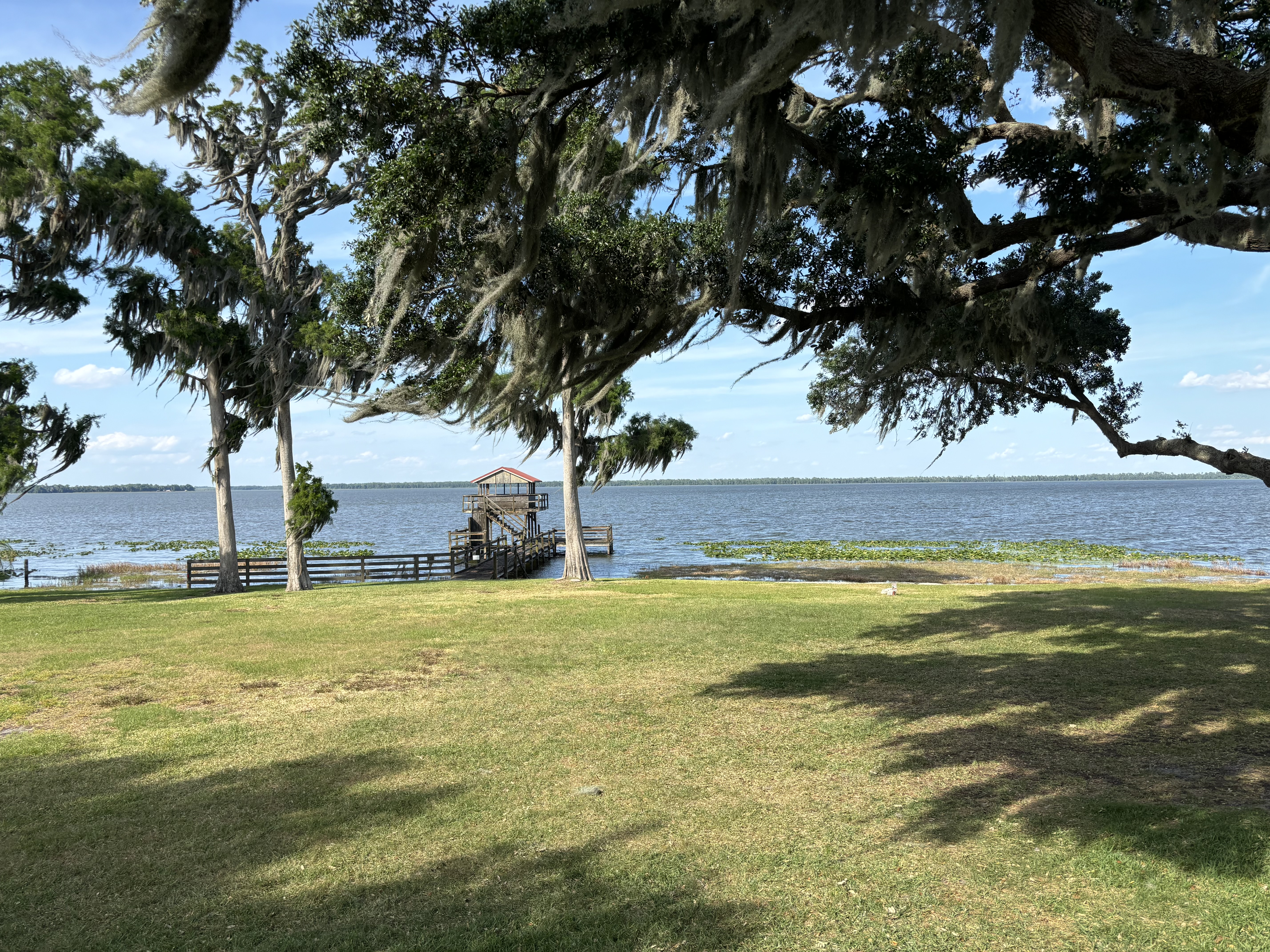

- Location within Florida
- Location: Polk County, Florida
- Coordinates: 27°58′41″N 81°31′23″W
- Type: lake
- Surface elevation: 75 ft (23 m)

Lake Pierce is a lake in Polk County, Florida, in the United States. Lake Pierce was named after Franklin Pierce, 14th President of the United States.
