= Luis Pacheco (slave) =

Afro-Spanish slave (1800–1895)

Luis Fatio Pacheco (December 26, 1800 – January 6, 1895) was an Afro-Spanish enslaved person who became known in 19th century Spanish Florida for his connection to the Black Seminole community.

== Biography ==
=== Early life and career ===
Pacheco was born December 26, 1800, on the New Switzerland plantation of Francis Philip Fatio Sr.—an associate and possibly a partner in Panton, Leslie, & Company. The plantation was located on the St. Johns River in Spanish Florida. Pacheco's father Adam was considered a skilled slave, having worked as a carpenter, boat builder, and driver he was noted as an intelligent and ambitious man.

With Pacheco's father working as a sought after slave, Pacheco received some privilege's allowing him to learn how to read and write. This is where he skill for learning multiple languages developed by the time he reached adulthood he knew French, Spanish, and English. Pacheco learned the Seminole language from his brother who was kidnapped by the Indians but was later returned to the plantation. In 1811, Francis Fatio Sr. died and left his property and slaves to his son Francis Fatio Jr. In 1812, the New Switzerland plantation was burned down by the Seminole who were enraged at the local planters who had assisted a group of American filibusters, called "the Patriots" during the Patriot War. By 1818, the Fatio Family, and likely Pacheco himself, had resettled on a plantation called San Pablo in what is now Duval County. Around that same time, he worked as a mail courier, carrying mail by boat between St. Augustine and St. Mary's, in Georgia. He also married an enslaved woman, whose freedom Pacheco had purchased from her owner, a man named Ramon Sanchez, of St. Augustine. The mail route ended in 1821 when Florida was acquired by the United States.

He would leave the Fatio plantation often to see his wife. Luis would often get into trouble for not informing his master when he would go to see his wife. In 1824 Luis Fatio and Francis Fatio Jr. had a falling out though no one is certain about it. Luis ran away from the plantation near Charlotte Harbor, working with the Spanish fisheries.

Luis was captured and returned to Fort Brooke between 1829 and 1831. Luis had been sold to four different people until he was sold to Antonio Pacheco, a Cuban who ran a business that he believed Fatio would be able to assist him. After the death of Antonio Pacheco, his wife leased him out to Captain John Casey of the U.S. military to work as an interpreter against the Seminole Indians. It was with Casey that Pacheco came to serve under Major Francis Dade.

=== Dade battle ===
The battle (sometimes called the Dade massacre) was an 1835 military defeat for the United States Army and is often recognized as the beginning of the Second Seminole War. The U.S. attempted to force the Seminoles to move away from their land in Florida and relocate to Indian Territory in Oklahoma. As part of this campaign, a column of 110 soldiers under the command of Major Francis L. Dade were dispatched from Fort Brooke and eventually ambushed by 180 Seminole warriors on December 28, 1835. The battle was a decisive victory for the Seminole. According to a soldier who survived, the Seminole and/or their black allies looted and scalped some of the U.S. soldiers. Pacheco, on the other hand, stated that no looting or scalping took place. Pacheco ended up being one of the three to four survivors on the U.S. side, and was suspected of being an informant and spent the rest of his life trying to clear his name. After Major Dade was shot Pacheco dropped to the ground swiftly and crawled for cover, which caused suspicion from the U.S. troops, believing Pacheco was expecting the ambush to occur.

Pacheco was found hiding by the Seminoles but was spared, possibly because he was "a black man...[and] not his own master." Pacheco repaid his captor's being reading the letters and dispatches found on the bodies of dead officers. This gave the Seminoles valuable information pertaining to the military's strategy. In 1837, he escaped the Indians and turned himself into the authorities hoping to clear his name.

=== Incarceration and re-enslavement ===
In 1837, Luis turned himself to the authorities seeking to clear his name. The man overseeing Luis's case later forgot about him and sent him to New Orleans with other Black Seminoles. Once they arrived in New Orleans, Luis sat in prison for a month; once released, he, along with the other Black Seminoles, was set free. In 1845 Marcellus Duval and his brother attempted to obtain all of the Black Seminoles set free in New Orleans, including Luis Fatio Pacheco. After being captured by the Duval brothers, he was enslaved to them until 1865, when slavery ended.

=== Later life and death ===
At the age of 82, Luis traveled back to Florida to see his former slave owner. When he arrived in Jacksonville, he met with Susan Philippa Fatio L'Engle. Despite having been gone from the family for nearly sixty years, Pacheco was able to prove that he had once worked for her father and was welcomed back and supported in his old age by her. He died on January 6, 1895, of "senility."

== Career notes ==
- Slave: Performed the tasks asked for by his master's
  - Mail courier: Luis organized a private mail route from St. Augustine and St. Mary's in Georgia; he would deliver mail by boat.
- Military Guide: Interpreter
  - Pacheco was a slave when we was sent to work in Tampa Bay. Pacheco was familiar with the country area and he spoke the Indian language he was hired for twenty-five dollars a month. This unique character was Pacheo, who was well acquainted with the Indians, spoke the Seminole tongue fluently. He was reported by his master, as faithful, intelligent and trustworthy, and was perfectly familiar with the route to Fort King.

== See also ==
- Runaway slaves in Spanish Florida
