= St. Augustine National Cemetery =

Historic veterans cemetery in St. Johns County, Florida

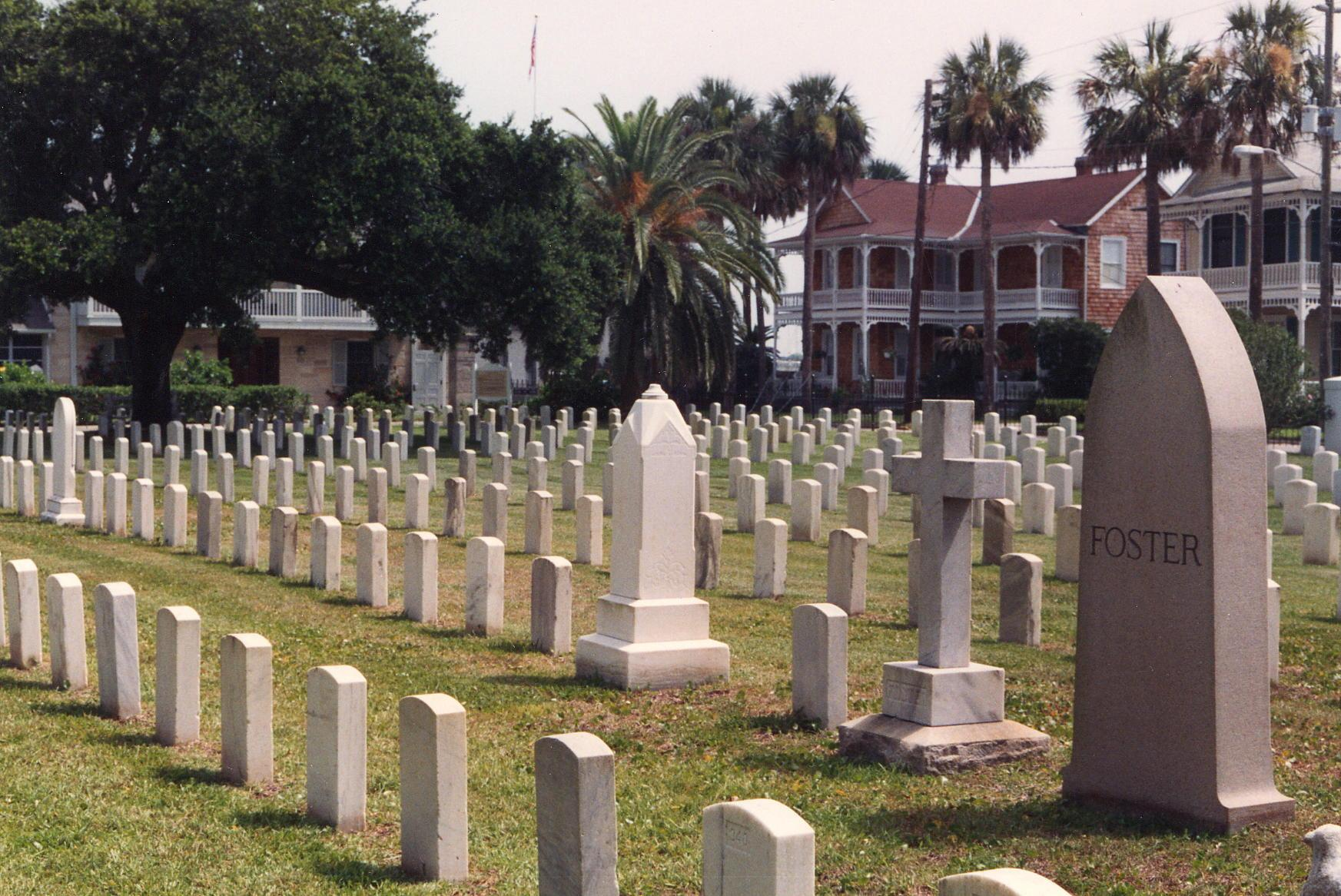
- Headstones with Victorian homes of St. Francis Barracks in the background.

Details
- Established: 1828
- Location: St. Augustine, Florida
- Country: United States
- Coordinates: 29°53′10″N 81°18′35″W
- Type: United States National Cemetery (closed to new interments)
- Owned by: U.S. Department of Veterans Affairs
- Size: 1.4 acres (0.57 ha)
- No. of interments: 2,788
- Website: Official
- Find a Grave: St. Augustine National Cemetery

St. Augustine National Cemetery is a United States National Cemetery located in the city of St. Augustine in St. Johns County, Florida. Located on the grounds of the active military installation known as St. Francis Barracks, the state headquarters of the Florida National Guard, it encompasses 1.4 acres (0.57 ha), and as of the end of 2005 had 2,788 interments. Administered by the United States Department of Veterans Affairs, it is currently closed to new interments. It was listed on the National Register of Historic Places in 2016.

== History ==
The first interment took place in 1828 in the area that was then used as the post cemetery for the St. Francis Barracks. The first burials were soldiers stationed at St. Francis Barracks and veterans of the Indian Wars, including many who were transferred from burial grounds in what was then Seminole-controlled territory.

During the American Civil War, St. Augustine was initially claimed by the Confederacy, but was quickly occupied by Union forces and remained in Union hands for the remainder of the war. After the war, the cemetery was expanded and improved, and in 1881 it became a National Cemetery.

The cemetery also contains the graves of five British Commonwealth servicemen of World War II, a soldier of the Royal Corps of Signals and four aviation officers of the Royal Naval Volunteer Reserve.

In 1970, St. Augustine National Cemetery was included in a National Historic Landmark historic district that encompasses the oldest part of the city.

== Notable monuments ==
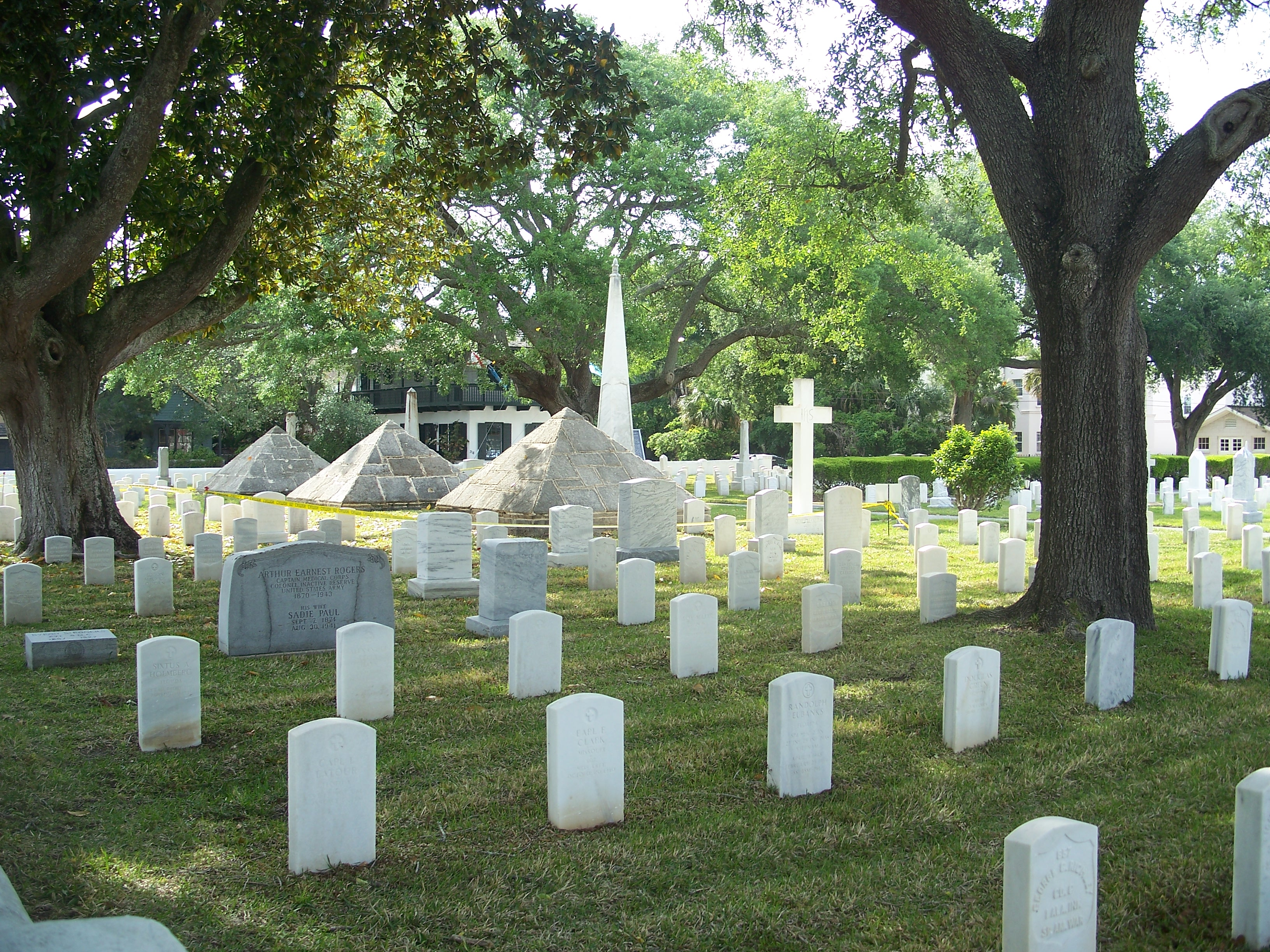

- The Dade Monument, three coquina pyramids erected in 1842 to mark the end of the second of the Seminole Wars. Beneath them are the remains of 1,468 soldiers who died during the wars.

== Notable interments ==
- Major Francis L. Dade (1792–1835), namesake of Dade County, Missouri, Miami-Dade County, Florida, and Dade County, Georgia, killed in the Seminole Wars.
- Captain George W. Gardiner (1795-1835), second in command to Major Francis Dade, killed in the Seminole Wars.
- Lieutenant John Winfield Scott McNeil (1817-1837), nephew of U.S. President Franklin Pierce, killed in the Seminole Wars.
- Brigadier General Martin Davis Hardin (1837–1923), Civil War Union general

== See also ==
- National Register of Historic Places listings in St. Johns County, Florida
- Jacksonville National Cemetery
