= John Adams =

Founding Father, U.S. president 1797 to 1801

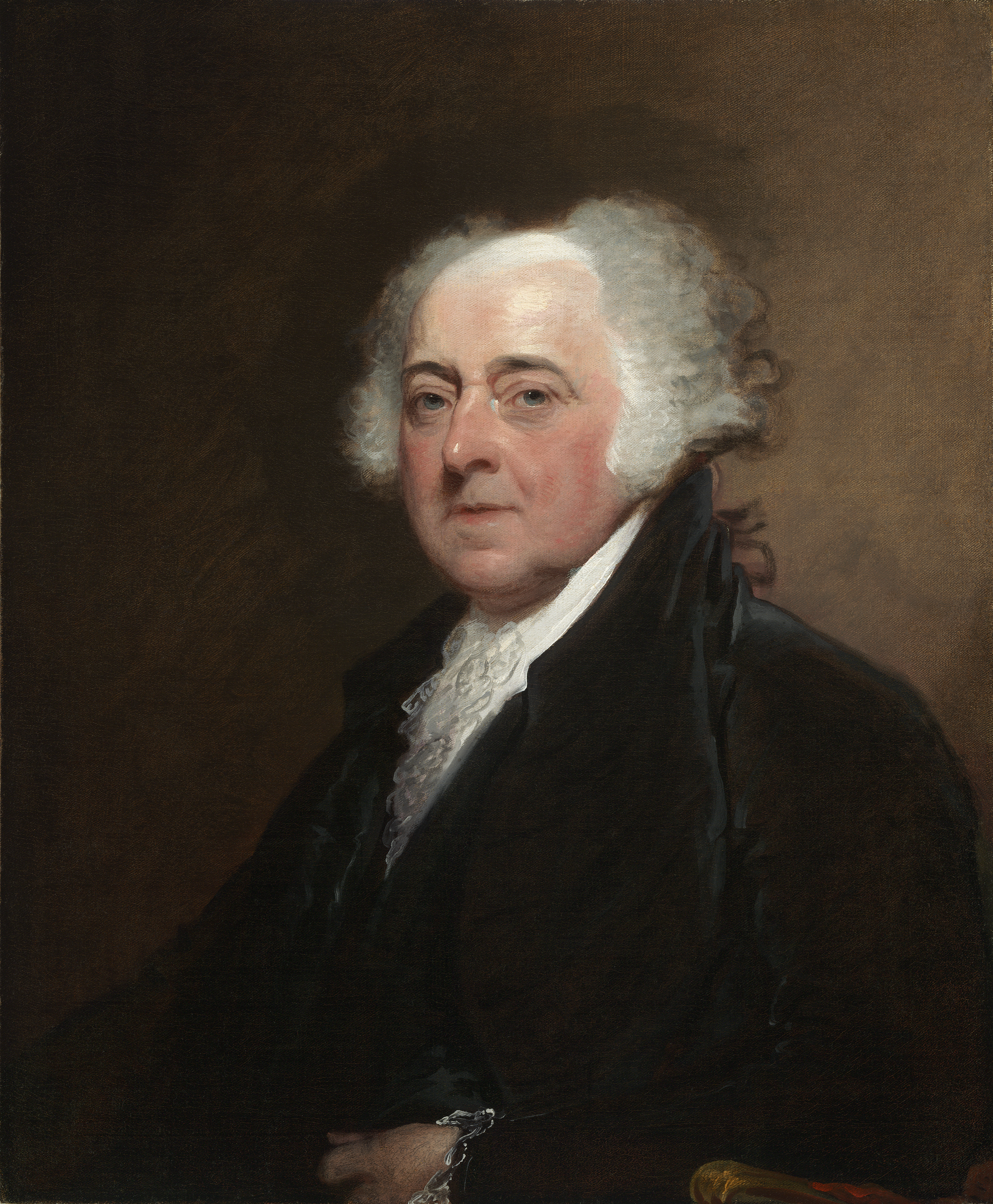
- Portrait, c. 1800–1815

2nd President of the United States
- In office March 4, 1797 – March 4, 1801
- Vice President: Thomas Jefferson
- Preceded by: George Washington
- Succeeded by: Thomas Jefferson

1st Vice President of the United States
- In office April 21, 1789 – March 4, 1797
- President: George Washington
- Preceded by: Office established
- Succeeded by: Thomas Jefferson

1st United States Minister to Great Britain
- In office April 1, 1785 – February 20, 1788
- Appointed by: Congress of the Confederation
- Succeeded by: Thomas Pinckney

1st United States Minister to the Netherlands
- In office April 19, 1782 – March 30, 1788
- Appointed by: Congress of the Confederation
- Succeeded by: Charles W. F. Dumas (acting)

Chairman of the Marine Committee
- In office October 13, 1775 – October 28, 1779
- Preceded by: Office established
- Succeeded by: Francis Lewis (Continental Board of Admiralty)

12th Chief Justice of the Massachusetts Superior Court of Judicature
- In office October 1775 – February 1777
- Appointed by: Provincial Congress
- Preceded by: Peter Oliver
- Succeeded by: William Cushing

Delegate from Massachusetts to the Continental Congress
- In office September 5, 1774 – November 28, 1777
- Preceded by: Office established
- Succeeded by: Samuel Holten

Member of the Massachusetts House of Representatives from Boston, Massachusetts
- In office June 7, 1770 – April 16, 1771
- Preceded by: James Bowdoin (elected, office not assumed)
- Succeeded by: James Otis Jr.

Personal details
- Born: October 30, 1735 [O.S. October 19, 1735] Braintree (now Quincy), Province of Massachusetts Bay, British America
- Died: July 4, 1826 (aged 90) Quincy, Massachusetts, U.S.
- Resting place: United First Parish Church
- Party: Pro-Administration (before 1795); Federalist (1795–c. 1808); Democratic-Republican (from c. 1808)
- Spouse: Abigail Smith (m. 1764; died 1818)
- Children: 6, including Abigail, John Quincy, Charles, and Thomas
- Parents: John Adams Sr.; Susanna Boylston
- Relatives: Adams political family
- Education: Harvard College (AB, AM)
- Occupation: Politician; Lawyer; Educator

John Adams (October 30, 1735 – July 4, 1826) was a Founding Father and the second president of the United States from 1797 to 1801. Before his presidency, he was a leader of the American Revolution that achieved independence from Great Britain. During the latter part of the Revolutionary War and in the early years of the new nation, he served the Continental Congress of the United States as a senior diplomat in Europe. Adams was the first vice president of the United States, serving from 1789 to 1797. He was a dedicated diarist and regularly corresponded with contemporaries, including his wife and advisor Abigail Adams and his friend and rival Thomas Jefferson.

A lawyer and political activist prior to the Revolution, Adams was devoted to the right to counsel and presumption of innocence. He defied anti-British sentiment and successfully defended British soldiers against murder charges arising from the Boston Massacre. Adams was a Massachusetts delegate to the Continental Congress and became a leader of the revolution. He seconded the Lee Resolution, which formally separated the United Colonies from Great Britain, and as a member of the Committee of Five assisted Jefferson in drafting the Declaration of Independence and was its primary advocate in Congress. As a diplomat, he represented the United States in France, and the Netherlands, during the war, and was the United States's first ambassador to Great Britain (a consequential position given the Revolutionary War). He helped negotiate the peace treaty with Great Britain and secured Dutch loans for the American government. Adams was the primary author of the Massachusetts Constitution in 1780, which, with his other political writings, influenced the United States Constitution.

Adams was elected to two terms as vice president under President George Washington and was elected as the United States' second president in 1796 under the banner of the Federalist Party. Adams's term was dominated by the issue of the French Revolutionary Wars, and his insistence on American neutrality led to fierce criticism from both the Jeffersonian Republicans and from some in his own party, led by his rival Alexander Hamilton. Adams signed the controversial Alien and Sedition Acts and built up the Army and Navy in an undeclared naval war with France. He was the first president to reside in the White House.

In his 1800 bid for reelection to the presidency, opposition from Federalists and accusations of despotism from Jeffersonians led to Adams losing to his vice president and former friend, Thomas Jefferson. After his defeat he retired to his Massachusetts home, Peacefield. He eventually resumed his friendship with Jefferson by initiating a continuing correspondence. John Adams died at Peacefield on July 4, 1826—the fiftieth anniversary of the adoption of the Declaration of Independence. The Adams political family included his son John Quincy Adams, the sixth president. Adams and his son are the only presidents of the first twelve who never owned slaves. Most historians have favorably ranked his presidency.

== Early life and education ==
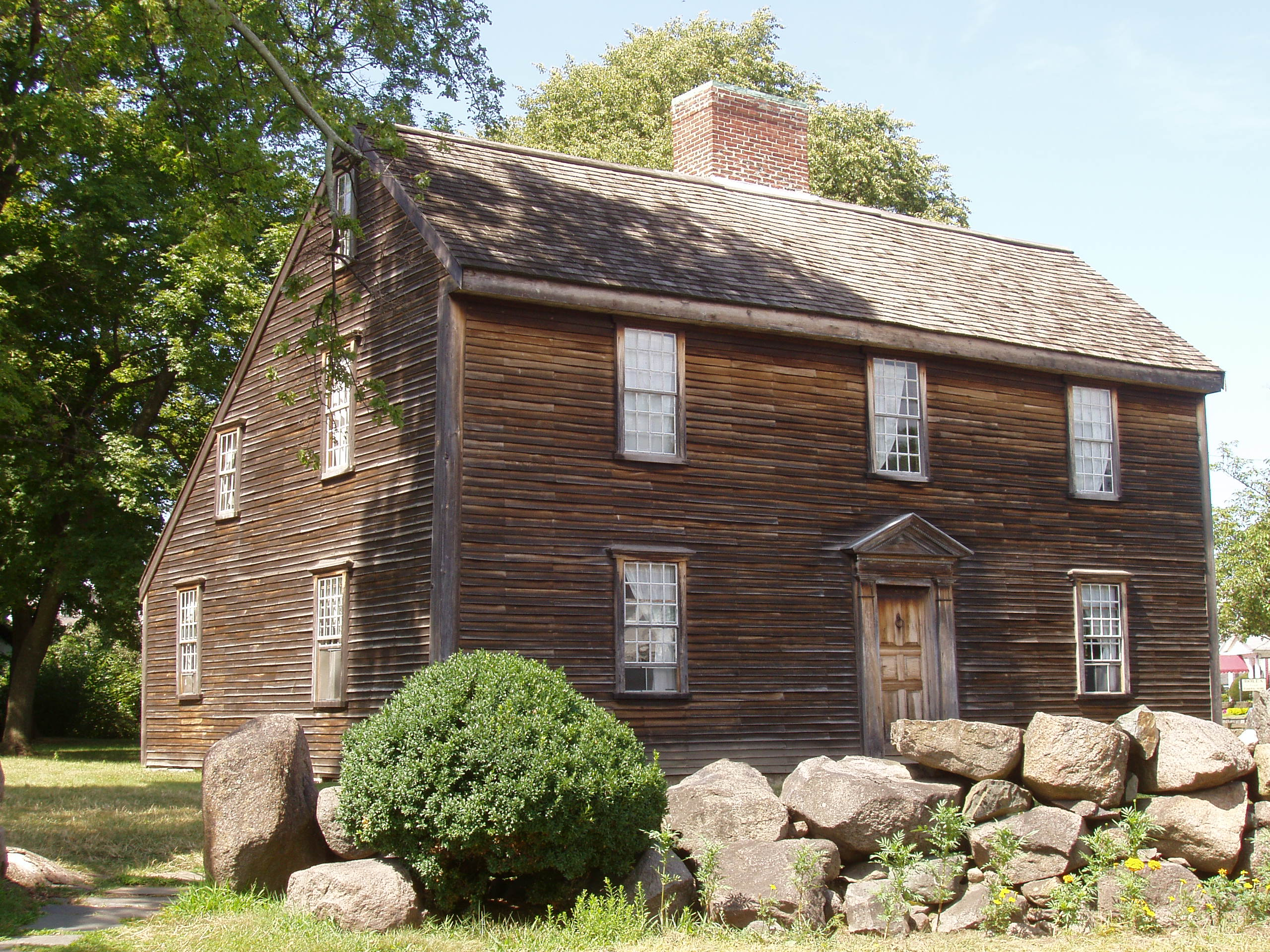
Adams's birthplace in present-day Quincy, Massachusetts

John Adams was born on October 30, 1735, (Note: Contemporaneous records used the Old Style Julian calendar and the Annunciation Style of enumerating years, recording his birth as October 19, 1735. The British Calendar (New Style) Act 1750 implemented in 1752 altered the official British dating method to the Gregorian calendar with the start of the year on January 1 (it had been March 25). These changes resulted in dates being moved forward 11 days and an advance of one year for those between January 1 and March 25. For a further explanation, see Old Style and New Style dates.) to John Adams Sr. and Susanna Boylston Adams. He had two younger brothers, Peter and Elihu. Adams was born on the family farm in Braintree, Massachusetts. (Note: The site of the Adams house is now in Quincy, Massachusetts, which was separated from Braintree and organized as a new town in 1792.) His mother was from a leading medical family of present-day Brookline, Massachusetts. His father worked as a farmer and a cordwainer, while serving as a deacon in the Congregational Church, and as a lieutenant in the militia. Adams often praised his father and recalled their close relationship. Adams's great-great-grandfather Henry Adams immigrated to Massachusetts from Braintree, Essex, England, around 1638.

Adams's formal education began at age six at a dame school, conducted at a teacher's home and centered on The New England Primer. He then attended Braintree Latin School under Joseph Cleverly, where studies included Latin, rhetoric, logic, and arithmetic. Adams's early education included incidents of truancy, a dislike for his master, and a desire to become a farmer, but his father commanded that he remain in school. Deacon Adams hired a new schoolmaster named Joseph Marsh, and his son responded positively. Adams later noted that "As a child I enjoyed perhaps the greatest of blessings that can be bestowed upon men—that of a mother who was anxious and capable to form the characters of her children."

=== College education and adulthood ===
At age sixteen, Adams entered Harvard College in 1751, studying under Joseph Mayhew. As an adult, Adams was a keen scholar, studying the works of ancient writers such as Thucydides, Plato, Cicero, and Tacitus in their original languages. Though his father expected him to be a minister, after his 1755 graduation with an A.B. degree, he taught school temporarily in Worcester while pondering his permanent vocation. In the next four years, he began to seek prestige, craving "Honour or Reputation" and "more defference from [his] fellows", and was determined to be "a great Man". He decided to become a lawyer, writing his father that he found among lawyers "noble and gallant achievements" but, among the clergy, the "pretended sanctity of some absolute dunces". He had reservations about his self-described "trumpery" and failure to share the "happiness of [his] fellow men".

When the French and Indian War began in 1754, Adams, aged nineteen, felt guilty he was the first in his family not to be a militia officer; he said "I longed more ardently to be a Soldier than I ever did to be a Lawyer".

=== Law practice and marriage ===
In 1756, Adams began reading law under James Putnam, a leading lawyer in Worcester. In 1758, he earned an A.M. from Harvard, and in 1759 was admitted to the bar. He developed an early habit of diary writing; this included his impressions of James Otis Jr.'s 1761 challenge to the legality of British writs of assistance, which allowed British officials to search a home without notice or reason. Otis's argument against the writs inspired Adams to join the cause of the American colonies.

In 1763, Adams explored aspects of political theory in seven essays written for Boston newspapers. Under the pen name "Humphrey Ploughjogger", he ridiculed the selfish thirst for power he perceived among the Massachusetts colonial elite. Adams was initially less well known than his older cousin Samuel Adams, but his influence emerged from his work as a constitutional lawyer, his analysis of history, and his dedication to republicanism. Adams often found his own irascible nature a constraint in his political career.

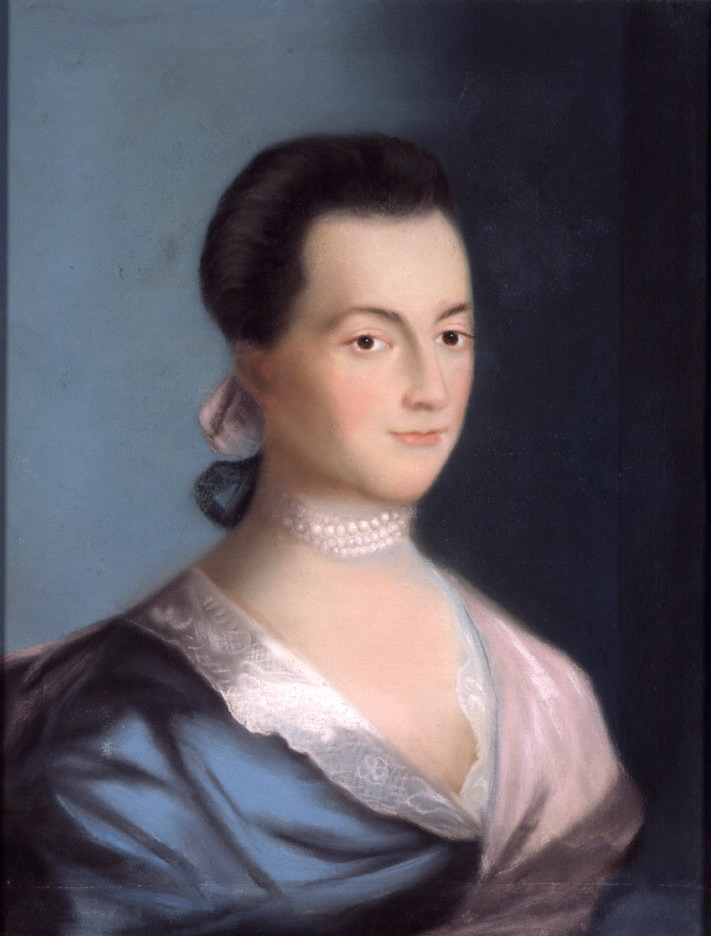
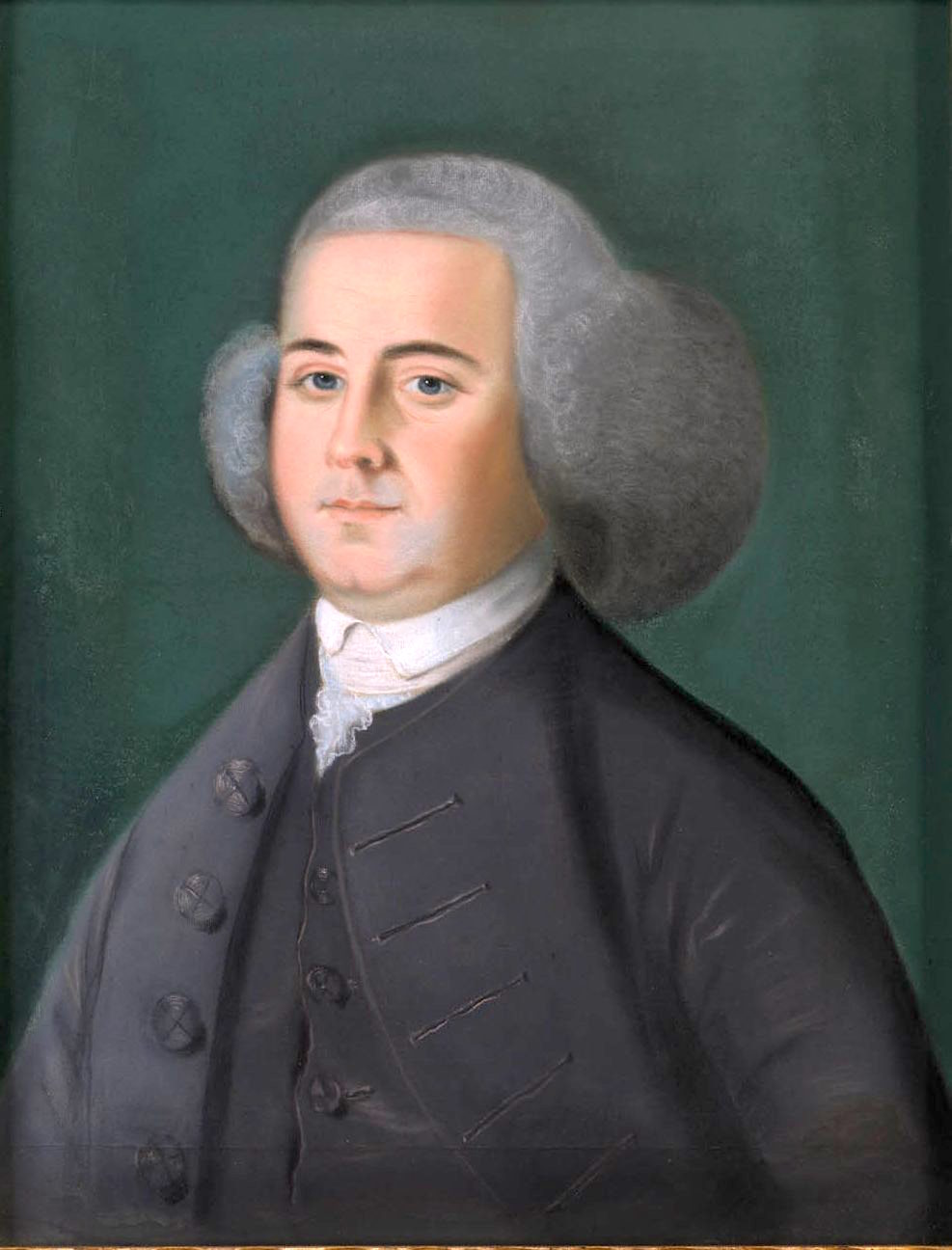
Portraits of John and Abigail Adams by Benjamin Blyth, c. 1766

In the late 1750s, Adams fell in love with Hannah Quincy; he was poised to propose but was interrupted by friends, and the moment was lost. In 1759, he met 15-year-old Abigail Smith, his third cousin, through his friend Richard Cranch, who was courting Abigail's older sister. Adams initially was not impressed with Abigail and her two sisters, writing that they were not "fond, nor frank, nor candid". In time, Adams grew close to Abigail. They were married on October 25, 1764, despite the opposition of Abigail's mother. The pair shared a love of books and proved honest in their praise and criticism of each other. After his father's death in 1761, Adams had inherited a 9 1/2-acre (3.8 ha) farm and a house where they lived until 1783.

John and Abigail had six children: Abigail (known as "Nabby") in 1765, John Quincy in 1767, Susanna in 1768, Charles in 1770, Thomas in 1772, and Elizabeth in 1777. Susanna died when she was one year old, while Elizabeth was stillborn. All three of Adams's sons became lawyers. Charles and Thomas were largely unsuccessful and became alcoholics. In contrast, John Quincy excelled and launched a political career, eventually becoming president himself.

== Career before the Revolution ==
=== Opponent of Stamp Act ===
Adams rose to prominence leading widespread opposition to the Stamp Act. The British Parliament passed the act without consulting colonial American legislatures. Designed to pay for the costs of the Seven Years' War, it required the colonies to pay a direct tax for stamped documents. Power of enforcement was given to British vice admiralty courts, rather than common law courts. These Admiralty courts acted without juries and were greatly disliked. The Act was despised for both its monetary cost and implementation without colonial consent, and encountered violent resistance, preventing its enforcement. Adams authored the "Braintree Instructions" in 1765, in a letter sent to the representatives of Braintree in the Massachusetts legislature. It explained that the Act should be opposed since it denied two fundamental rights guaranteed to all Englishmen (and which all free men deserved): to be taxed only by consent and to be tried by a jury of one's peers. The instructions were a succinct and forthright defense of colonial rights and liberties, and served as a model for other towns.

Adams also reprised his pen name "Humphrey Ploughjogger" in opposition to the Stamp Act in August of that year, publishing four articles in the Boston Gazette. These articles were republished in The London Chronicle in 1768 as True Sentiments of America, or A Dissertation on the Canon and Feudal Law. He also spoke in December before the governor and council, pronouncing the Stamp Act invalid in the absence of Massachusetts representation in Parliament. He noted that many protests were sparked by a popular sermon of Boston minister Jonathan Mayhew, invoking Romans 13 to justify insurrection. While Adams strongly opposed the Act in writing, he rebuffed attempts by Samuel Adams, a leader in the popular protest movements, to involve him in mob actions and public demonstrations. In 1766, a town meeting of Braintree elected Adams as a selectman.

With the repeal of the Stamp Act in early 1766, tensions with Britain temporarily eased. Putting politics aside, Adams moved his family to Boston in April 1768 to focus on his law practice. The family rented a house on Brattle Street that was known locally as the "White House". He, Abigail, and the children lived there for a year, then moved to Cold Lane; later they moved again to a larger house in Brattle Square in the center of the city. In 1768, Adams successfully defended the merchant John Hancock, who was accused of violating British acts of trade in the Liberty Affair. With the death of Jeremiah Gridley and the mental collapse of James Otis Jr., Adams became Boston's most prominent lawyer. On June 7, 1770, Adams succeeded James Bowdoin, who had vacated his seat, as a member of the Massachusetts House of Representatives. He served in this capacity until April 16, 1771.

=== Counsel for the British: Boston Massacre ===
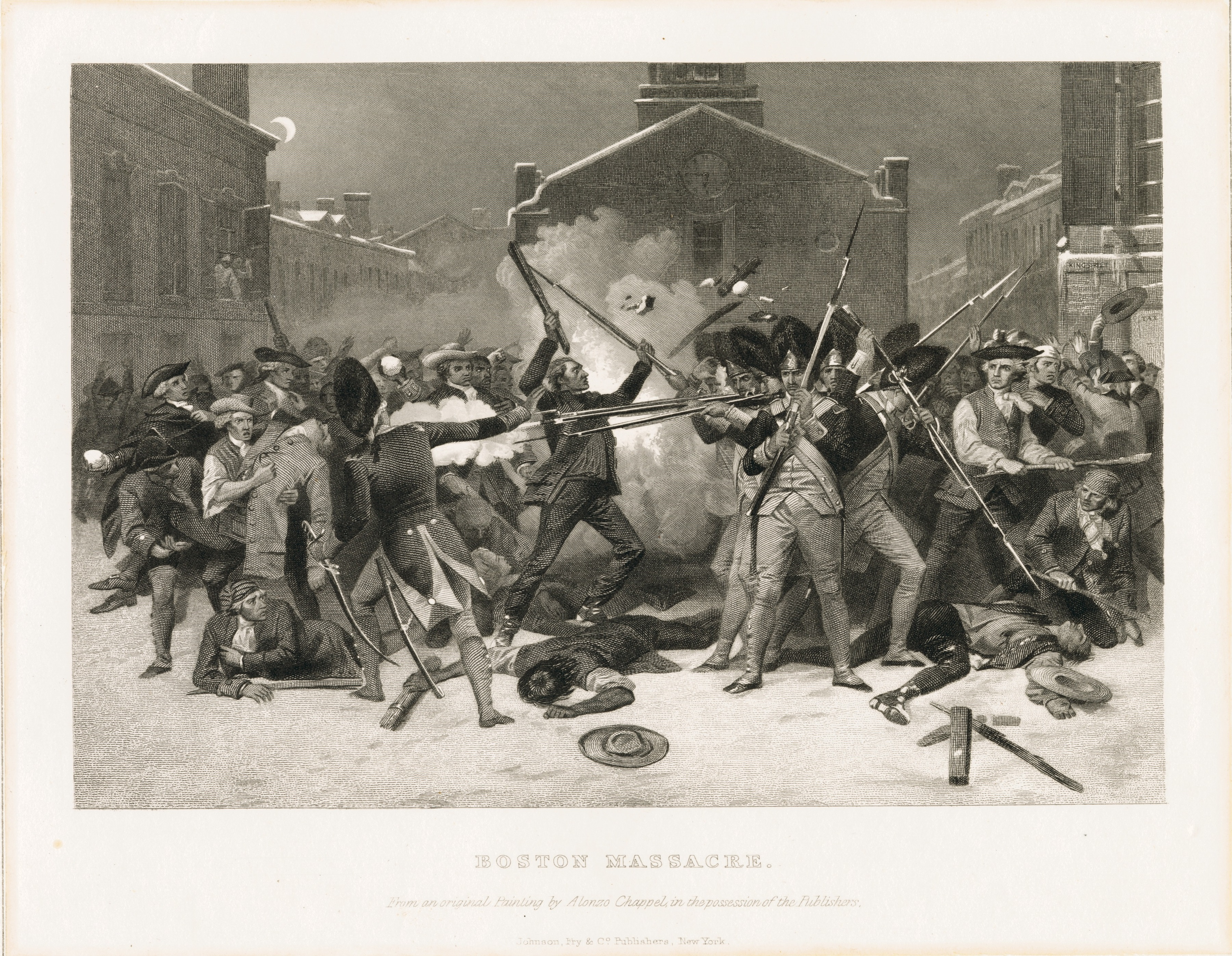
Boston Massacre of 1770, an 1878 portrait by Alonzo Chappel depicting the Boston Massacre

Britain's passage of the Townshend Acts in 1767 revived tensions, and an increase in mob violence led the British to dispatch more troops to the colonies. On March 5, 1770, when a mob accosted a lone British sentry, eight of his fellow soldiers reinforced him, and the crowd around them grew to several hundred. The soldiers were struck with snowballs, ice, and stones, and in the chaos the soldiers opened fire, killing five civilians, in the infamous Boston Massacre. The accused soldiers were arrested on charges of murder. When no other attorneys would come to their defense, Adams decided to do so despite the risk to his reputation. He believed no person should be denied the right to counsel and a fair trial. The trials were delayed so that passions could cool.

The week-long trial of the commander, Captain Thomas Preston, began on October 24 and ended in his acquittal, because it was impossible to prove that he had ordered his soldiers to fire. The remaining soldiers were tried in December when Adams made his famed argument regarding jury decisions: "Facts are stubborn things; and whatever may be our wishes, our inclinations, or the dictates of our passions, they cannot alter the state of facts and evidence". Adams won an acquittal for six of the soldiers. Two, who had fired directly into the crowd, were convicted of manslaughter. Adams was paid a small sum by his clients.

According to biographer John E. Ferling, during jury selection Adams "expertly exercised his right to challenge individual jurors and contrived what amounted to a packed jury. Not only were several jurors closely tied through business arrangements to the British army, but five ultimately became Loyalist exiles." While Adams's defense was helped by a weak prosecution, he "performed brilliantly." Ferling surmises that Adams was encouraged to take the case in exchange for political office; one of Boston's seats opened three months later in the Massachusetts legislature, and Adams was the town's choice to fill the vacancy.

The prosperity of his law practice increased from this exposure, as did the demands on his time. In 1771, Adams moved his family to Braintree, Massachusetts, but kept his office in Boston; he noted "Now my family is away, I feel no Inclination at all, no Temptation, to be any where but at my Office." After some time in the capital, he became disenchanted with the rural and "vulgar" Braintree as a home for his family—in August 1772, he moved them back to Boston. He purchased a large brick house on Queen Street, not far from his office. In 1774, Adams and Abigail returned the family to the farm due to the increasingly unstable situation in Boston, and Braintree remained their permanent Massachusetts home.

=== American Revolution ===
Adams, who had been among the more conservative of the Founding Fathers, persistently held that while British actions against the colonies had been wrong, open insurrection was unwarranted and peaceful petition with the view of remaining part of Great Britain was preferable. His ideas began to change around 1772, as the British Crown assumed payment of the salaries of Governor Thomas Hutchinson and his judges instead of the Massachusetts legislature. Adams wrote in the Gazette that these measures would destroy judicial independence and place the colonial government in closer subjugation to the Crown. After discontent among members of the legislature, Hutchinson delivered a speech warning that Parliament's powers over the colonies were absolute and that any resistance was illegal. John Adams, Samuel, and Joseph Hawley drafted a resolution adopted by the House of Representatives threatening independence as an alternative to tyranny. The resolution argued that the colonists had never been under the sovereignty of Parliament: their charter, as well as their allegiance, was exclusive to the King.

The Boston Tea Party, a demonstration against the Tea Act and the British East India Company's tea monopoly over American merchants, took place on December 16, 1773. Protestors demolished 342 chests of tea worth about ten thousand pounds on the British schooner Dartmouth, anchored in Boston harbor. The Dartmouth owners briefly retained Adams as legal counsel regarding their liability for the destroyed shipment. Adams applauded the destruction of the tea, calling it the "grandest Event" in the history of the colonial protest movement, and writing in his diary that it was an "absolutely and indispensably" necessary action.

== Continental Congress ==
=== Member of Continental Congress ===
John Trumbull's Declaration of Independence depicting the Committee of Five presenting its draft of the Declaration to the Congress in Philadelphia; Adams appears in the center with his hand on his hip.

In 1774, at the instigation of Samuel Adams, the First Continental Congress was convened in response to the Intolerable Acts, a series of deeply unpopular measures intended to punish Massachusetts, centralize authority in Britain, and prevent rebellion in other colonies. Four delegates were chosen by the Massachusetts legislature, including John Adams, who agreed to attend, despite an emotional plea from his friend, Attorney General Jonathan Sewall, not to.

Shortly after he arrived in Philadelphia, Adams was placed on the 23-member Grand Committee tasked with drafting a letter of grievances to King George III. The committee soon split into conservative and radical factions. Although the Massachusetts delegation was largely passive, Adams criticized conservatives such as Joseph Galloway, James Duane, and Peter Oliver who advocated a conciliatory policy towards the British or felt that the colonies had a duty to remain loyal to Britain, although his views at the time aligned with those of conservative John Dickinson. Adams sought the repeal of objectionable policies, but at this stage he continued to see benefits in maintaining the ties with Britain. He renewed his push for the right to a jury trial. He complained of what he considered the pretentiousness of the other delegates, writing to Abigail, "I believe if it was moved and seconded that We should come to a Resolution that Three and two make five We should be entertained with Logick and Rhetorick, Law, History, Politicks and Mathematicks, concerning the Subject for two whole Days, and then We should pass the Resolution unanimously in the Affirmative." Adams ultimately helped engineer a compromise between the conservatives and the radicals. The Congress disbanded in October after sending the petition to the King and showing its displeasure with the Intolerable Acts by endorsing the Suffolk Resolves, which called for a boycott of British goods.

Adams's absence was hard on Abigail, who was left alone to care for the family. She still encouraged her husband in his task, writing: "You cannot be, I know, nor do I wish to see you an inactive Spectator, but if the Sword be drawn I bid adieu to all domestick felicity, and look forward to that Country where there is neither wars nor rumors of War in a firm belief that thro the mercy of its King we shall both rejoice there together."

News of the opening hostilities with the British at the Battles of Lexington and Concord made Adams hope that independence would soon become a reality. Three days after the battle, he rode into a militia camp and, while reflecting positively on the high spirits of the men, was distressed by their poor condition and lack of discipline. A month later, Adams returned to Philadelphia for the Second Continental Congress as the leader of the Massachusetts delegation. He moved cautiously at first, noting that the Congress was divided between Loyalists, those favoring independence, and those hesitant to take any position. He became convinced that Congress was moving in the proper direction—away from Great Britain. Publicly, Adams supported "reconciliation if practicable," but privately agreed with Benjamin Franklin's confidential observation that independence was inevitable.

In June 1775, with a view of promoting union among the colonies against Great Britain, he nominated George Washington of Virginia as commander-in-chief of the army then assembled around Boston. He praised Washington's "skill and experience" as well as his "excellent universal character." Adams opposed various attempts, including the Olive Branch Petition, aimed at finding peace. Invoking the already-long list of British actions against the colonies, he wrote, "In my opinion Powder and Artillery are the most efficacious, Sure, and infallibly conciliatory Measures We can adopt." After his failure to prevent the petition from being enacted, he wrote a private letter derisively referring to Dickinson as a "piddling genius." The letter was intercepted and published in Loyalist newspapers. The well-respected Dickinson refused to greet Adams and he was for a time largely ostracized. Ferling writes, "By the fall of 1775 no one in Congress labored more ardently than Adams to hasten the day when America would be separate from Great Britain." In October 1775, Adams was appointed chief judge of the Massachusetts Superior Court, but he never served, and resigned in February 1777. In response to queries from other delegates, Adams wrote the 1776 pamphlet Thoughts on Government, which laid out an influential framework for republican constitutions.

=== Independence ===
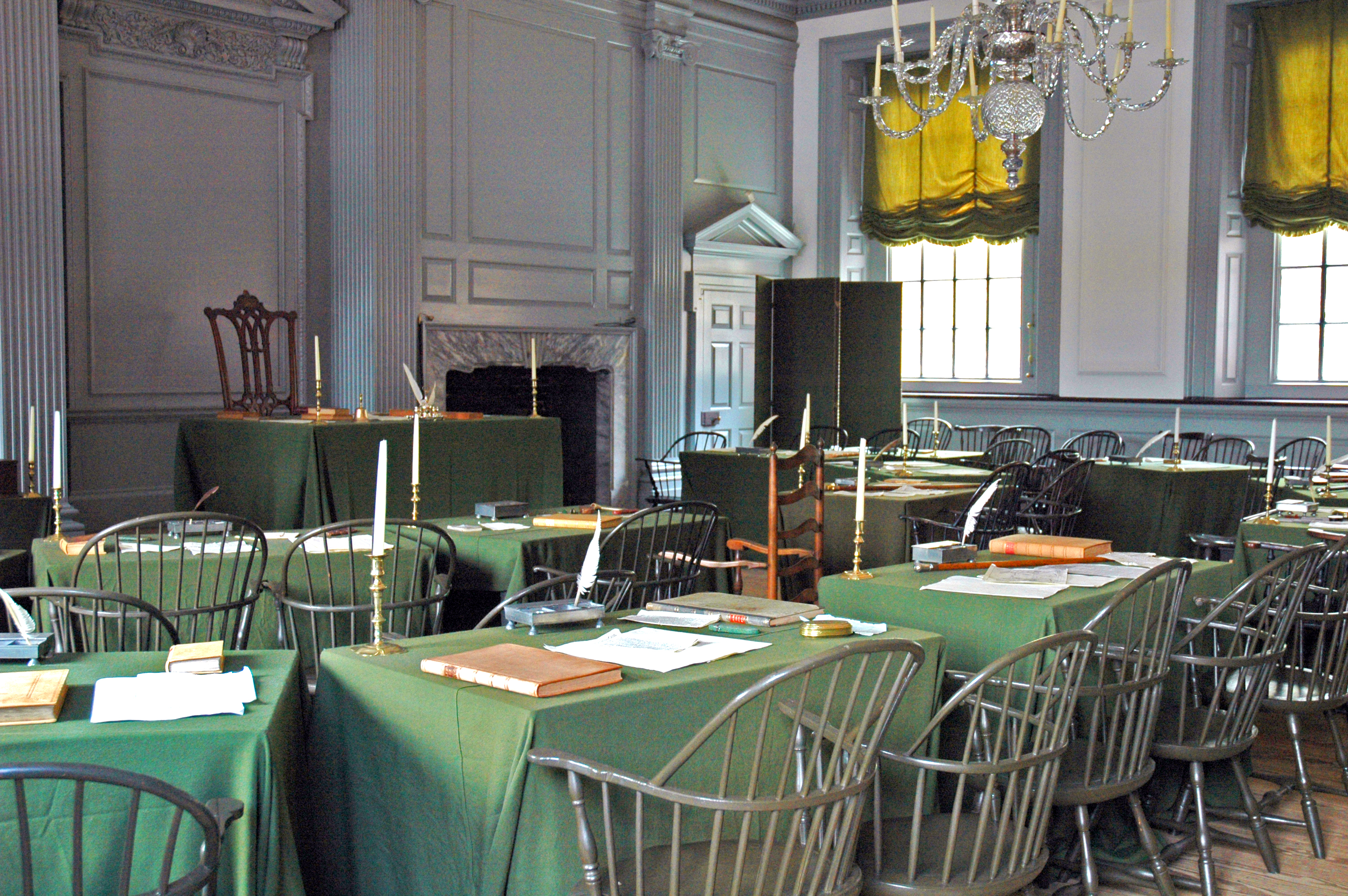
The Assembly Room at Independence Hall in Philadelphia, where the Second Continental Congress adopted the Declaration of Independence

Throughout the first half of 1776, Adams grew increasingly impatient with what he perceived to be the slow pace of declaring independence. In the Second Continental Congress in Philadelphia, he helped push through a plan to outfit armed ships to launch raids on enemy vessels. Later in the year, he drafted the first set of regulations for the provisional navy. Adams drafted the preamble to the Lee Resolution of colleague Richard Henry Lee. He developed a rapport with delegate Thomas Jefferson of Virginia, who had been slower to support independence but by early 1776 agreed that it was necessary. On June 7, 1776, Adams seconded the Lee Resolution, which stated that the colonies were "free and independent states."

Prior to independence being declared, Adams organized a Committee of Five charged with drafting a Declaration of Independence. He chose himself, Jefferson, Benjamin Franklin, Robert R. Livingston and Roger Sherman. Jefferson thought Adams should write the document, but Adams persuaded the committee to choose Jefferson. Many years later, Adams recorded his reasoning to Jefferson: "Reason first, you are a Virginian, and a Virginian ought to appear at the head of this business. Reason second, I am obnoxious, suspected, and unpopular. You are very much otherwise. Reason third, you can write ten times better than I can." The Committee left no minutes, and the drafting process itself remains uncertain. Accounts written years later by Jefferson and Adams, although frequently cited, are often contradictory. Although the first draft was written primarily by Jefferson, Adams assumed a major role. On July 1, the resolution was debated in Congress. It was expected to pass, but opponents such as Dickinson made a strong effort to oppose it. Jefferson, a poor debater, remained silent while Adams argued for its adoption. Many years later, Jefferson hailed Adams as "the pillar of [the Declaration's] support on the floor of Congress, [its] ablest advocate and defender against the multifarious assaults it encountered." On July 2, Congress officially voted for independence. Twelve colonies voted in the affirmative, while New York abstained. Dickinson was absent. On July 3, Adams wrote to Abigail that "yesterday was decided the greatest question which was ever debated in America, and a greater perhaps never was nor will be decided among men." He predicted that "[t]he second day of July, 1776, will be the most memorable epoch in the history of America," and would be celebrated annually. Congress approved the Declaration of Independence on July 4.

During the congress, Adams sat on ninety committees, chairing twenty-five, an unmatched workload among the congressmen. As Benjamin Rush reported, he was acknowledged "to be the first man in the House." In June 1776, Adams became head of the Board of War and Ordnance, charged with recording the officers in the army and their ranks, the disposition of troops throughout the colonies, and ammunition. He was referred to as a "one man war department," working up to eighteen-hour days and mastering the details of raising, equipping and fielding an army under civilian control. Adams functioned as a de facto Secretary of War. He kept extensive correspondences with Continental Army officers concerning supplies, munitions, and tactics. Adams emphasized to them the role of discipline in keeping an army orderly. He authored the "Plan of Treaties," laying out Congress's requirements for a treaty with France. He was worn out by the rigor of his duties and longed to return home. His finances were unsteady, and the money that he received as a delegate failed to cover his expenses. However, the crisis caused by the defeat of the American soldiers kept him at his post.

After defeating the Continental Army at the Battle of Long Island on August 27, 1776, British Admiral Richard Howe determined that a strategic advantage was at hand, and requested that Congress send representatives to negotiate peace. A delegation consisting of Adams, Franklin, and Edward Rutledge met with Howe at the Staten Island Peace Conference on September 11. Howe's authority was premised on the states' submission, so the parties found no common ground. When Lord Howe stated he could view the American delegates only as British subjects, Adams replied, "Your lordship may consider me in what light you please, ... except that of a British subject." Adams learned many years later that his name was on a list of people specifically excluded from Howe's pardon-granting authority. Adams was unimpressed with Howe and predicted American success. He was able to return home to Braintree in October before leaving in January 1777 to resume his duties in Congress.

== Diplomatic service ==
=== Commissioner to France ===
Adams advocated in Congress that independence was necessary to establish trade, and conversely, trade was essential for the attainment of independence; he specifically urged negotiation of a commercial treaty with France. He was appointed, along with Franklin, Dickinson, Benjamin Harrison from Virginia, and Robert Morris from Pennsylvania, "to prepare a plan of treaties to be proposed to foreign powers." While Jefferson was writing the Declaration of Independence, Adams worked on the Model Treaty, which authorized a commercial agreement with France but contained no provisions for formal recognition or military assistance. The treaty adhered to the provision that "free ships make free goods," allowing neutral nations to trade reciprocally while exempting an agreed-upon list of contraband. By late 1777, America's finances were in tatters, and that September a British army had defeated General Washington and captured Philadelphia. More Americans came to determine that mere commercial ties between the U.S. and France would not be enough, and that military assistance would be needed. The defeat of the British at Saratoga was expected to help induce France to agree to an alliance.

In November 1777, Adams learned that he was to be named commissioner to France, replacing Silas Deane and joining Franklin and Arthur Lee in Paris to negotiate an alliance with the French. James Lovell invoked Adams's "inflexible integrity" and the need to have a youthful man who could counterbalance Franklin's age. On November 27, Adams accepted. Abigail was left in Massachusetts to manage their home, but it was agreed that 10-year-old John Quincy would go with Adams, for the experience was "of inestimable value" to his maturation. On February 17, 1778, Adams set sail aboard the frigate Boston, commanded by Captain Samuel Tucker. The trip was stormy and treacherous. British vessels pursued the ship, with Adams personally taking up arms to help capture one. A cannon malfunction wounded several sailors and killed one. On April 1, the Boston arrived in France, where Adams learned that France had agreed to an alliance with the United States on February 6. Adams was annoyed by the other two commissioners: Lee, whom he thought paranoid and cynical, and the popular and influential Franklin, whom he found lethargic and overly deferential to the French. He assumed a less visible role but helped manage the delegation's finances and record-keeping. Frustrated by the perceived lack of commitment on the part of the French, Adams wrote a letter to French foreign minister Vergennes in December, arguing for French naval support in North America. Franklin toned down the letter, but Vergennes ignored it. In September 1778, Congress increased Franklin's powers by naming him minister plenipotentiary to France while Lee was sent to Spain. Adams received no instructions. Frustrated by the apparent slight, he departed France with John Quincy on March 8, 1779. On August 2, they arrived in Braintree.

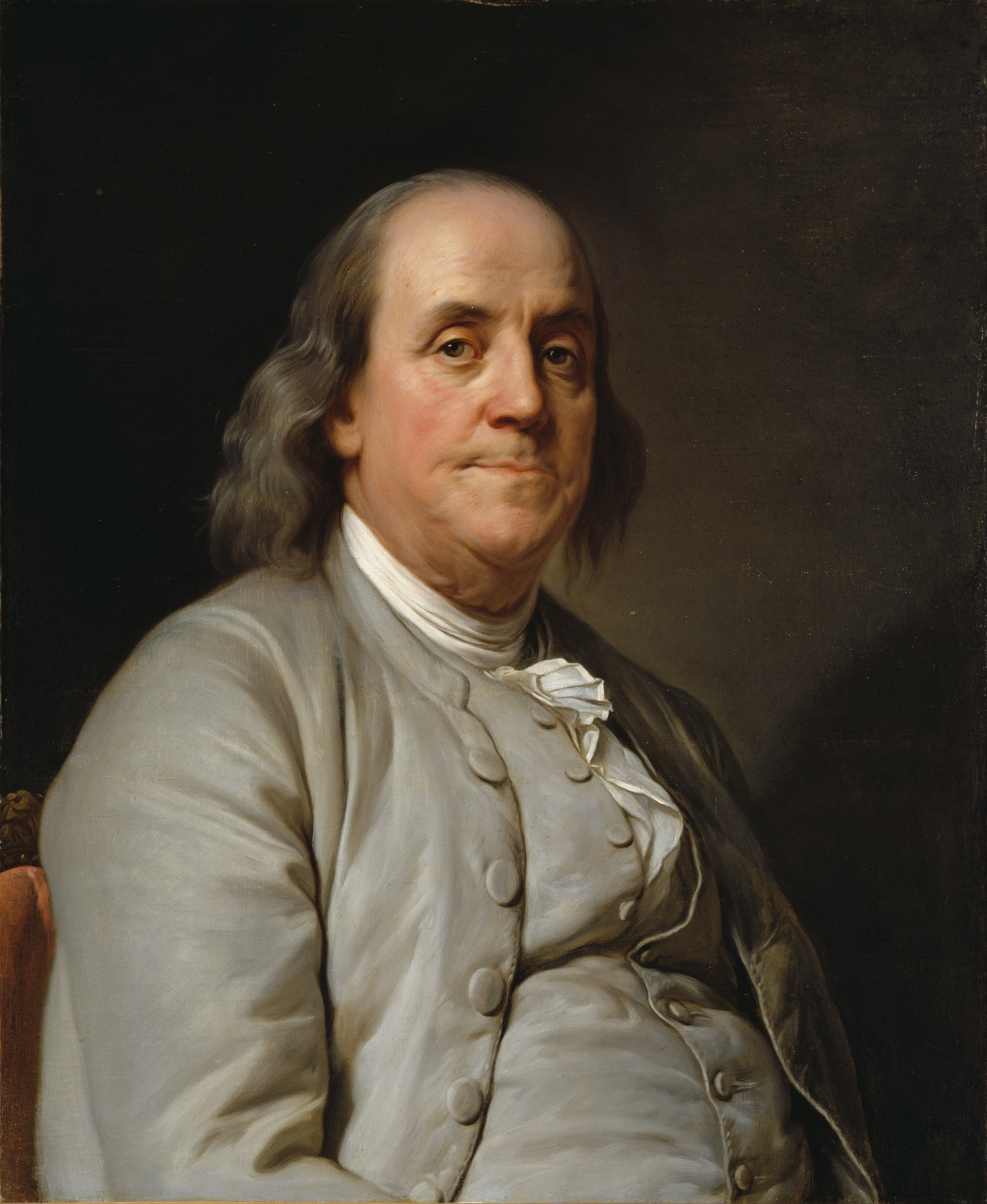
Adams frequently clashed with Benjamin Franklin over how to manage relations with France.

In late 1779, Adams was appointed as the sole minister charged with negotiations to establish a commercial treaty with Britain and end the war. Following the Massachusetts constitutional convention, he departed for France in November, accompanied by his sons John Quincy and 9-year-old Charles. A leak forced the ship to land in Ferrol, Spain, and Adams and his party spent six weeks traveling overland to Paris. Constant disagreement between Lee and Franklin eventually resulted in Adams assuming the role of tie-breaker in almost all votes on commission business. He increased his usefulness by mastering French. Lee was eventually recalled. Adams closely supervised his sons' education while writing to Abigail about once every ten days.

In contrast to Franklin, Adams viewed the Franco-American alliance pessimistically. The French, he believed, were involved for their own self-interest, and he grew frustrated by what he saw as their sluggishness in providing substantial aid. The French, Adams wrote, meant to keep their hands "above our chin to prevent us from drowning, but not to lift our heads out of water." In March 1780, Congress, trying to curb inflation, voted to devalue the dollar. Vergennes summoned Adams for a meeting. In a letter sent in June, he insisted that fluctuation of the dollar value without an exception for French merchants was unacceptable and requested that Adams write to Congress asking it to "retrace its steps." Adams bluntly defended the decision, not only claiming that the French merchants were doing better than Vergennes implied but voicing other grievances he had with the French. The alliance had been made over two years before. During that period, an army under the comte de Rochambeau had been sent to assist Washington, but it had yet to do anything of significance and America was expecting French warships. These were needed, Adams wrote, to contain the British armies in the port cities and contend with the powerful British Navy. However, the French Navy had been sent not to the United States but to the West Indies to protect French interests there. France, Adams believed, needed to commit itself more fully to the alliance. Vergennes responded that he would deal only with Franklin, who sent a letter back to Congress critical of Adams. Adams then left France of his own accord.

=== Ambassador to the Dutch Republic ===
In mid-1780, Adams traveled to the Dutch Republic. Because the Dutch Republic was one of the few other republics at the time, Adams thought it might be sympathetic to the American cause. Securing a Dutch loan could increase American independence from France and pressure Britain into peace. At first, Adams had no official status, but in July he was formally given permission to negotiate for a loan and took up residence in Amsterdam in August. Adams was originally optimistic and greatly enjoyed the city, but soon became disappointed. The Dutch, fearing British retaliation, refused to meet Adams. Before he had arrived, the British found out about secret aid the Dutch had sent to the Americans and authorized reprisals against their ships, which only increased their apprehension. Word had also reached Europe of American battlefield defeats. After five months of not meeting with a single Dutch official, Adams in early 1781 pronounced Amsterdam "the capital of the reign of Mammon." He was finally invited to present his credentials as ambassador to the Dutch government at The Hague on April 19, 1781, but they did not promise any assistance. In the meantime, Adams thwarted an attempt by neutral European powers to mediate the war without consulting the United States. In July, Adams consented to the departure of both of his sons; John Quincy went with Adams's secretary Francis Dana to Saint Petersburg as a French interpreter in an effort to seek recognition from Russia, and a homesick Charles returned home with Adams's friend Benjamin Waterhouse. In August, shortly after being removed from his position of sole head of peace treaty negotiations, Adams had "a major nervous breakdown." That November, he learned that American and French troops had decisively defeated the British at Yorktown. The victory was in large part due to the assistance of the French Navy, which vindicated Adams's stand for increased naval assistance.

News of the American triumph at Yorktown convulsed Europe. In January 1782, after recovering, Adams arrived at The Hague to demand that the States General answer his petitions. His efforts stalled, and he took his cause to the people, successfully capitalizing on popular pro-American sentiment. Several provinces began recognizing American independence. On April 19, the States General formally recognized American independence and acknowledged Adams as ambassador. On June 11, with the aid of the Dutch Patriotten leader Joan van der Capellen tot den Pol, Adams negotiated a loan of five million guilders. In October, he negotiated a treaty of amity and commerce. The house that Adams bought during this stay in the Netherlands became the first American embassy on foreign soil.

=== Treaty of Paris ===
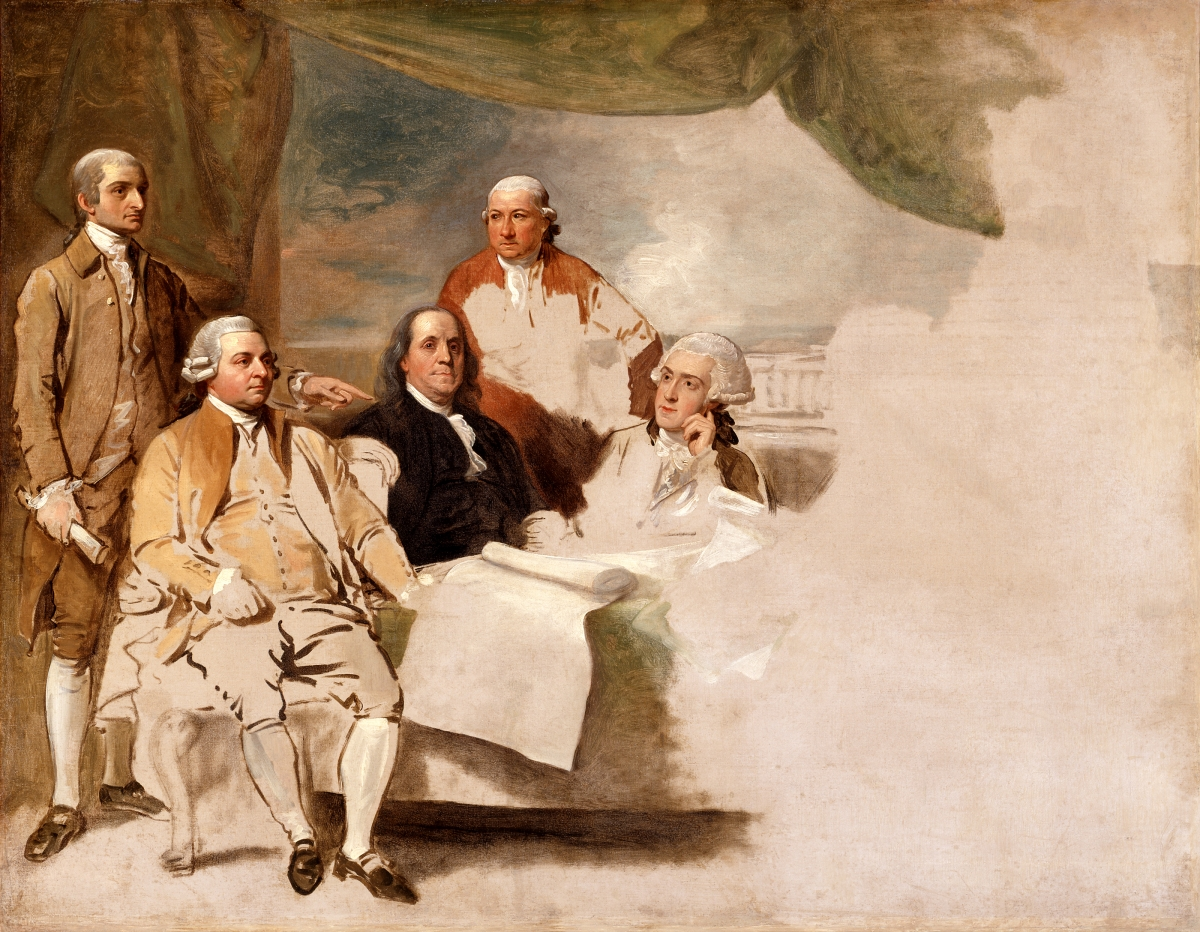
Treaty of Paris, an unfinished 1783 portrait by Benjamin West with Adams seated in front

After negotiating the loan with the Dutch, Adams was re-appointed as the American commissioner to negotiate the war-ending treaty, the Treaty of Paris. Vergennes and France's minister to the United States, Anne-César de La Luzerne, disapproved of Adams, so Franklin, Thomas Jefferson, John Jay, and Henry Laurens were appointed to collaborate with Adams, although Jefferson did not initially go to Europe and Laurens was posted to the Dutch Republic following his imprisonment in the Tower of London.

In the final negotiations, securing fishing rights off Newfoundland and Cape Breton Island proved both very important and very difficult. In response to very strict restrictions proposed by the British, Adams insisted that not only should American fishermen be allowed to travel as close to shore as desired, but that they should be allowed to cure their fish on the shores of Newfoundland. This, and other statements, prompted Vergennes to secretly inform the British that France did not feel compelled to "sustain [these] pretentious ambitions." Overruling Franklin and distrustful of Vergennes, Jay and Adams decided not to consult with France, instead dealing directly with the British. During these negotiations, Adams mentioned to the British that his proposed fishing terms were more generous than those offered by France in 1778 and that accepting would foster goodwill between Britain and the United States while putting pressure on France. Britain agreed, and the two sides worked out other provisions afterward. Vergennes was angered when he learned from Franklin of the American duplicity, but did not demand renegotiation. He was surprised at how much the Americans could extract. The independent negotiations also allowed the French to plead innocence to their Spanish allies, whose demands for Gibraltar might have caused significant problems. On September 3, 1783, the treaty was signed and American independence was recognized.

=== Ambassador to Great Britain ===
Adams was appointed the first American ambassador to Great Britain in 1785. After arriving in London from Paris, Adams had his first audience with King George III on June 1, which he meticulously recorded in a letter to Foreign Minister Jay the next day. The pair's exchange was respectful; Adams promised to do all that he could to restore friendship and cordiality "between People who, tho Seperated [sic] by an Ocean and under different Governments have the Same Language, a Similar Religion and kindred Blood," and the King agreed to "receive with Pleasure, the Assurances of the friendly Dispositions of the United States." The King added that although "he had been the last to consent" to American independence, he had always done what he thought was right. He startled Adams by commenting that "There is an Opinion, among Some People, that you are not the most attached of all Your Countrymen, to the manners of France." Adams replied, "That Opinion sir, is not mistaken... I have no Attachments but to my own Country." King George responded, "An honest Man will never have any other."

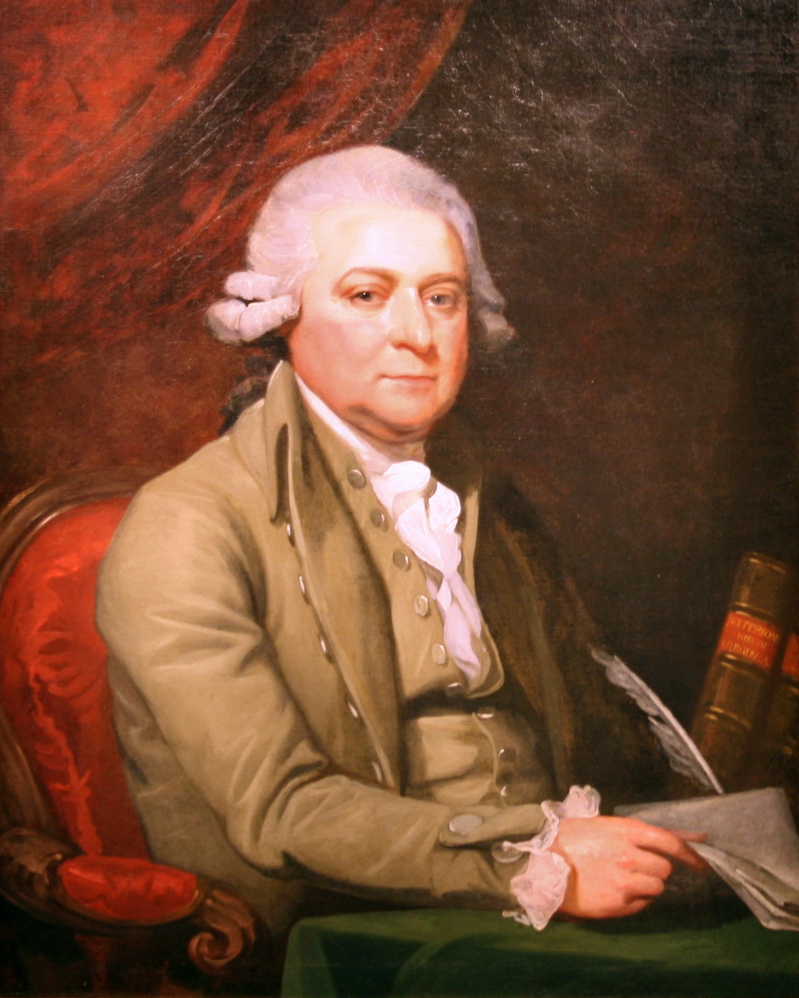
Adams – 1785, a portrait by Mather Brown

Adams was joined by Abigail in London. Suffering the hostility of the King's courtiers, they escaped when they could by seeking out Richard Price, minister of Newington Green Unitarian Church and instigator of the debate over the Revolution within Britain. Adams corresponded with his sons John Quincy and Charles, both of whom were at Harvard, cautioning the former against the "smell of the midnight lamp" while admonishing the latter to devote sufficient time to study. Jefferson visited Adams in 1786 while serving as Minister to France; the two toured the countryside and saw many historical sites. While in London, Adams met his old friend Jonathan Sewall, but the two discovered that they had grown too far apart to renew their friendship. Adams considered Sewall one of the war's casualties, and Sewall critiqued him as an ambassador:

His abilities are undoubtedly equal to the mechanical parts of his business as ambassador, but this is not enough. He cannot dance, drink, game, flatter, promise, dress, swear with the gentlemen, and small talk and flirt with the ladies; in short, he has none of those essential arts or ornaments which constitute a courtier. There are thousands who, with a tenth of his understanding and without a spark of his honesty, would distance him infinitely in any court in Europe.

While in London Adams wrote his three-volume A Defense of the Constitutions of Government of the United States of America, a response to those he had met in Europe who criticized the government systems of the American states.

Adams's tenure in Britain was complicated by both countries failing to follow their treaty obligations. The American states had been delinquent in paying debts owed to British merchants, and in response, the British refused to vacate forts in the northwest as promised. Adams's attempts to resolve this dispute failed, and he was often frustrated by a lack of news of progress from home. The news he received of tumult at home, such as Shays' Rebellion, heightened his anxiety. He asked Jay to be relieved; in 1788, he took his leave of George III, who promised to uphold his end of the treaty once America did the same. Adams then went to The Hague to take formal leave of his ambassadorship there and to secure refinancing from the Dutch, allowing the United States to meet obligations on earlier loans.

== Vice presidency (1789–1797) ==
=== Election ===
On June 17, 1788, Adams returned to a triumphant welcome in Massachusetts. He returned to farming life in the months after. The nation's first presidential election was soon to take place. Because George Washington was widely expected to win the presidency, many felt that the vice presidency should go to a northerner. Although he made no public comments on the matter, Adams was the primary contender. Each state's presidential electors gathered on February 4, 1789, to cast their two votes for the president. The person with the most votes would be president and the second would become vice president. Adams received 34 electoral college votes in the election, second behind Washington, who was a unanimous choice with 69 votes. As a result, Washington became the nation's first president, and Adams became its first vice president. Adams finished well ahead of all others except Washington, but was still offended by Washington receiving more than twice as many votes. In an effort to ensure that Adams did not accidentally become president and that Washington would have an overwhelming victory, Alexander Hamilton convinced at least 7 of the 69 electors not to cast their vote for Adams. After finding out about the manipulation but not Hamilton's role in it, Adams wrote to Benjamin Rush that his election was "a curse rather than a blessing."

Although his term started on March 4, 1789, Adams did not begin serving as vice president until April 21, because he did not arrive in New York in time. With Adams as vice president, Washington chose Hamilton to lead the Treasury Department, Edmund Randolph as Attorney General, and Henry Knox to be Secretary of War. Jefferson later became Secretary of State.

=== Tenure ===
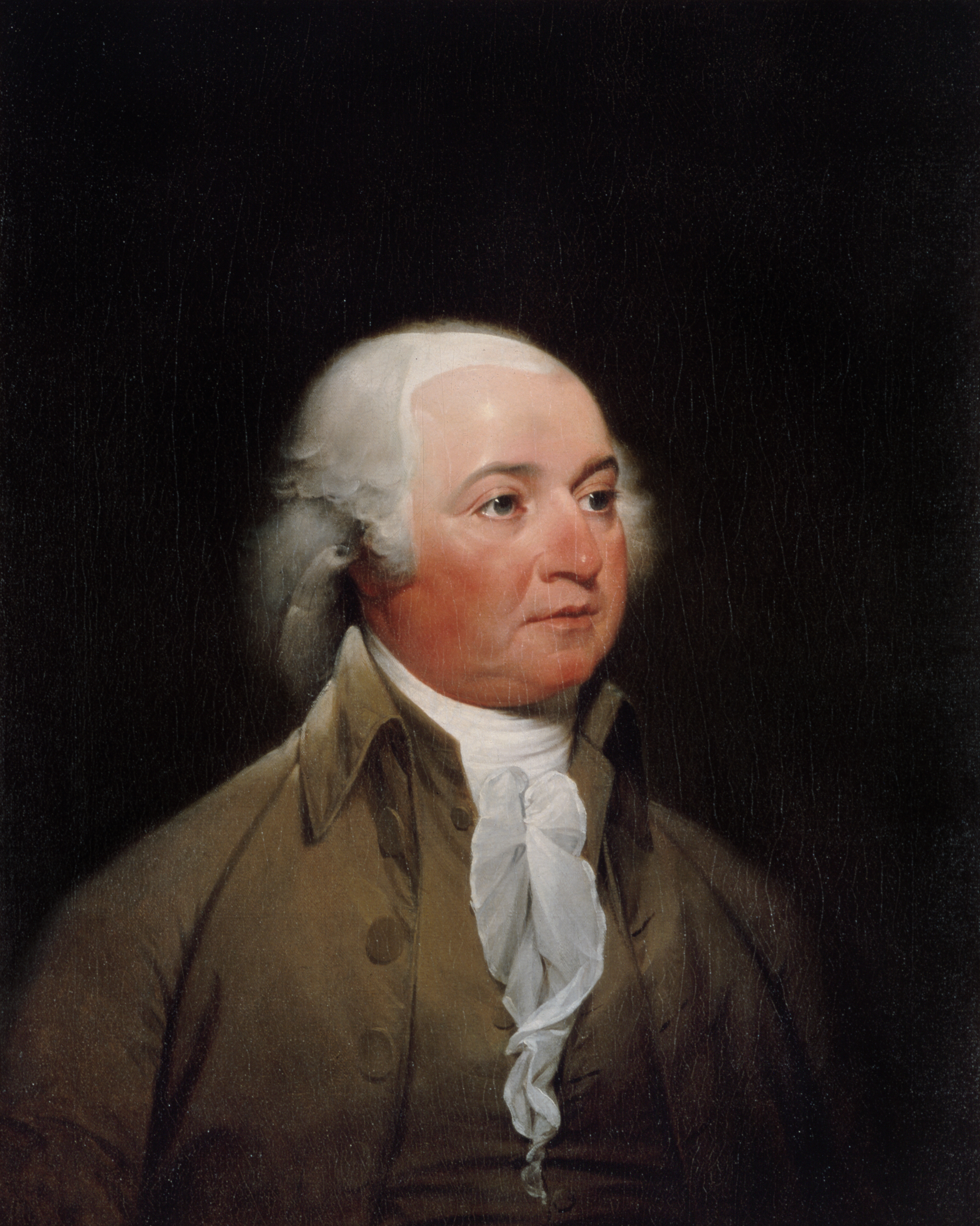
Portrait of John Adams by John Trumbull, 1793

The sole constitutionally prescribed responsibility of the vice president is to preside over the U.S. Senate, where they were empowered to cast a tie-breaking vote. Early in his term, Adams became deeply involved in a lengthy Senate controversy over the official titles for the president and executive officers of the new government. Although the House agreed that the president should be addressed simply as "George Washington, President of the United States", the Senate debated the issue at some length. Adams favored the style of Highness (as well as the title of Protector of Their [the United States'] Liberties) for the president. Some senators favored a variant of Highness or the lesser Excellency. Anti-federalists in the Senate objected to the monarchical sound of them all; Jefferson described them as "superlatively ridiculous."

They argued that these "distinctions," as Adams called them, violated the Constitution's prohibition on titles of nobility. Adams said that the distinctions were necessary because the highest office of the United States must be marked with "dignity and splendor". He was widely derided for his combative nature and stubbornness, especially as he actively debated and lectured the senators. "For forty minutes he harangued us from the chair," wrote Senator William Maclay of Pennsylvania. Maclay became Adams's fiercest opponent and repeatedly expressed personal contempt for him in public and private. He likened Adams to "a monkey just put into breeches." Ralph Izard suggested that Adams be referred to as "His Rotundity," a joke which soon became popular. On May 14, 1789, the Senate decided that the title of "Mr. President" would be used. Privately, Adams conceded that his vice presidency had begun poorly and that perhaps he had been out of the country too long to know the sentiment of the people. Washington quietly expressed his displeasure with the fuss.

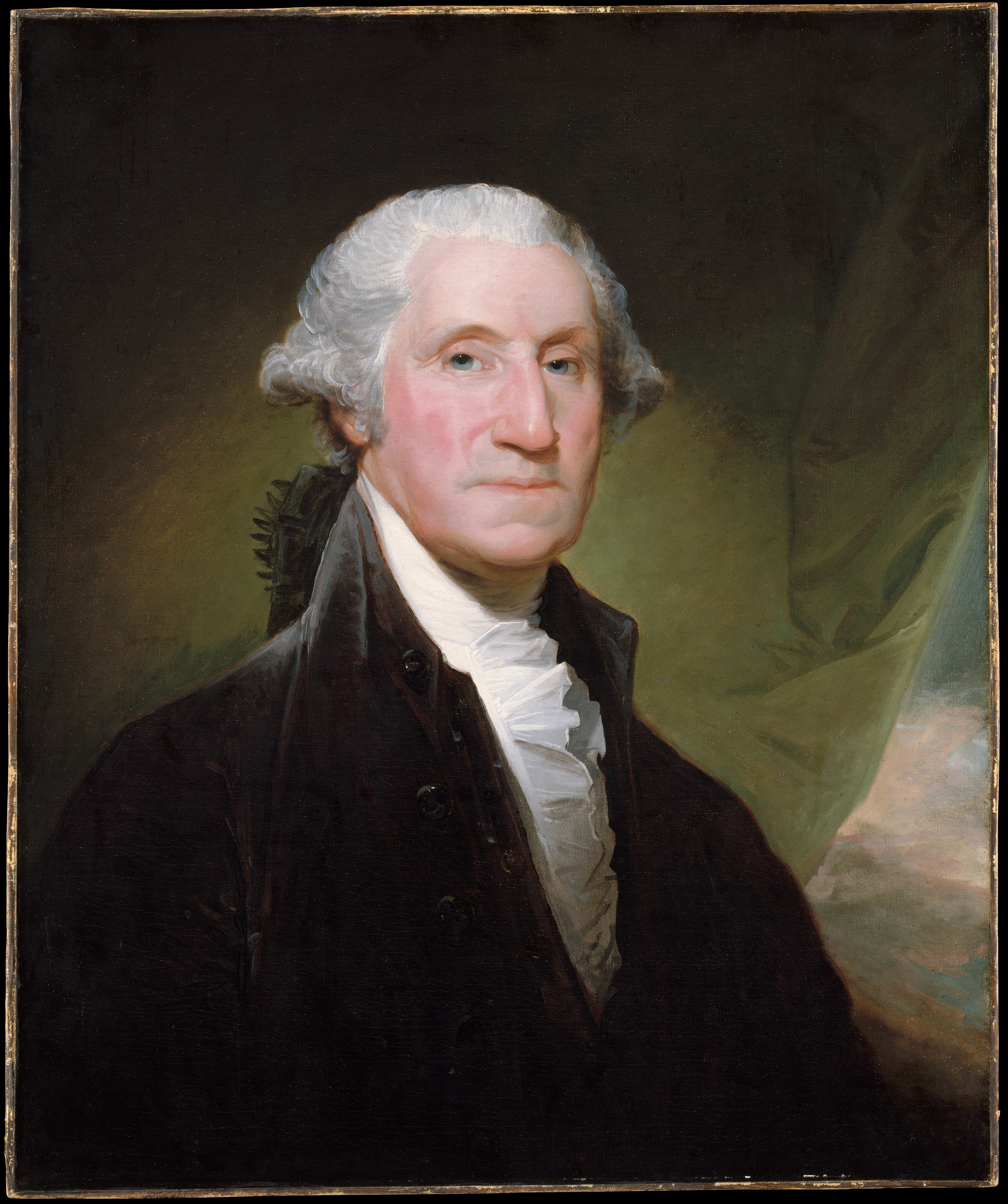
Portrait of George Washington by Gilbert Stuart, 1795. Washington rarely consulted Vice President Adams, who often felt marginalized and overshadowed by Washington's prestige.

As vice president, Adams largely sided with Washington's cabinet and the emerging Federalist Party. He supported Washington's policies against opposition from anti-Federalist Republicans. He cast 29 tie-breaking votes, and is one of only three vice presidents who have cast more than 20 during their tenure. He voted against a bill sponsored by Maclay that would have required Senate consent for the removal of executive branch officials who had been confirmed by the Senate. In 1790, Jefferson, James Madison, and Hamilton struck a bargain guaranteeing Republican support for Hamilton's debt assumption plan in exchange for the capital being temporarily moved from New York to Philadelphia, and then to a permanent site on the Potomac River to placate Southerners. In the Senate, Adams cast a tie-breaking vote against a last-minute motion to keep the capital in New York.

Adams played a minor role in politics as vice president. He attended few cabinet meetings, and the President sought his counsel infrequently. While Adams brought energy and dedication to the office, by mid-1789 he had already found it "not quite adapted to my character ... too inactive, and mechanical." He wrote, "My country has in its wisdom contrived for me the most insignificant office that ever the invention of man contrived or his imagination conceived." Adams's initial behavior in the Senate made him a target for critics of Washington's presidency. Toward the end of his first term, he grew accustomed to a marginal role, and rarely intervened in debate. Adams never questioned Washington's courage or patriotism, but Washington did join Franklin and others as the object of Adams's ire or envy. "The History of our Revolution will be one continued lie," Adams declared. "The essence of the whole will be that Dr. Franklin's electrical Rod smote the Earth and out sprung General Washington. That Franklin electrified him with his Rod—and henceforth these two conducted all the Policy, Negotiations, Legislatures and War." Adams won reelection with little difficulty in 1792 with 77 votes. His strongest challenger, George Clinton, had 50.

On July 14, 1789, the French Revolution began. Republicans were jubilant. Adams at first expressed cautious optimism, but soon began denouncing the revolutionaries as barbarous and tyrannical. Washington eventually consulted Adams more often, but not until near the end of his presidency, by which point distinguished cabinet members Hamilton and Jefferson had resigned. The British had been raiding American trading vessels, and John Jay was sent to London to negotiate an end to hostilities. When he returned in 1795 with a peace treaty on terms unfavorable to the United States, Adams urged Washington to sign it to prevent war. Washington did so, igniting protests and riots. He was accused of surrendering American honor to a tyrannical monarchy and of turning his back on the French Republic. John Adams predicted in a letter to Abigail that ratification would deeply divide the nation.

=== Election of 1796 ===
1796 presidential election results in which Adams narrowly defeated Thomas Jefferson

The 1796 election was the first contested American presidential election. Twice, George Washington had been elected to office unanimously but, during his presidency, deep philosophical differences between the two leading figures in the administration—Hamilton and Jefferson—had caused a rift, leading to the founding of the Federalist and Republican parties. When Washington announced that he would not stand for a third term, an intense partisan struggle for control of Congress and the presidency began.

As in the previous two presidential elections, no candidates were put forward for voters to choose between in 1796. The Constitution provided for the selection of electors who would then choose a president. In seven states voters chose the presidential electors. In the remaining nine states, they were chosen by the state's legislature. The clear Republican favorite was Jefferson. Adams was the Federalist frontrunner. The Republicans held a congressional nominating caucus and named Jefferson and Aaron Burr as their presidential choices. Jefferson at first declined the nomination, but he agreed to run a few weeks later. Federalist members of Congress held an informal nominating caucus and named Adams and Thomas Pinckney as their candidates. The campaign was mostly confined to newspaper attacks, pamphlets, and political rallies; of the four contenders, only Burr actively campaigned. The practice of not campaigning for office would persist for decades. Adams stated that he wanted to stay out of the "silly and wicked game" of electioneering.

As the campaign progressed, fears grew among Hamilton and his supporters that Adams was too vain, opinionated, unpredictable and stubborn to follow their directions. Indeed, Adams did not consider himself a strong member of the Federalist Party. He had remarked that Hamilton's economic program, centered around banks, would "swindle" the poor and unleash the "gangrene of avarice." Desiring "a more pliant president than Adams," Hamilton maneuvered to tip the election to Pinckney. He coerced South Carolina Federalist electors, pledged to vote for "favorite son" Pinckney, to scatter their second votes among candidates other than Adams. Hamilton's scheme was undone when several New England state electors heard of it and agreed not to vote for Pinckney. Adams wrote shortly after the election that Hamilton was a "proud Spirited, conceited, aspiring Mortal always pretending to Morality, with as debauched Morals as old Franklin who is more his Model than any one I know." Throughout his life, Adams made highly critical statements about Hamilton. He made derogatory references to his womanizing, real or alleged, and slurred him as the "Creole bastard," a reference to his Caribbean origins.

Adams won the presidency by a narrow margin, receiving 71 electoral votes to 68 for Jefferson, who became the vice president; Pinckney finished third with 59 votes, and Burr came fourth with 30. The balance of the votes were dispersed among nine other candidates. This is the only election to date in which a president and vice president were elected from opposing tickets.

== Presidency (1797–1801) ==
=== Inauguration ===
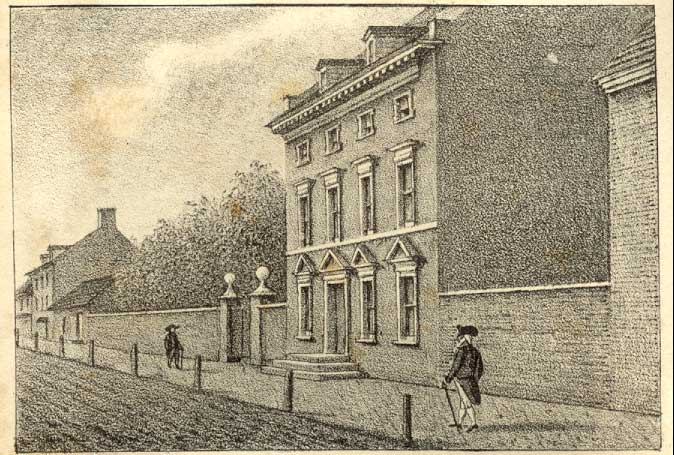
President's House in Philadelphia, which was then the national capital; Adams occupied this Philadelphia mansion from March 1797 to May 1800.

Adams was sworn into office as the nation's second president on March 4, 1797. He followed Washington's lead in using the presidency to exemplify republican values and civic virtue, and his service was free of scandal. Adams spent much of his term at his Massachusetts home Peacefield, preferring the quietness of domestic life to business at the capital. He ignored the political patronage and office-seeking which other officeholders utilized.

Historians debate the wisdom of his decision to retain Washington's cabinet given its loyalty to Hamilton. The "Hamiltonians who surround him," Jefferson remarked, "are only a little less hostile to him than to me." Although aware of Hamilton's influence, Adams was convinced that their retention ensured a smoother succession. Adams maintained the economic programs of Hamilton, who regularly consulted with key cabinet members, especially the powerful Treasury Secretary, Oliver Wolcott Jr. Adams was in other respects quite independent of his cabinet, often making decisions despite opposition from it. Hamilton had grown accustomed to being regularly consulted by Washington. Shortly after Adams was inaugurated, Hamilton sent him a detailed letter with policy suggestions. Adams dismissively ignored it.

=== Failed peace commission and XYZ affair ===
External videos
- Booknotes interview with Joseph Ellis on Passionate Sage: The Character and Legacy of John Adams, September 5, 1993, C-SPAN

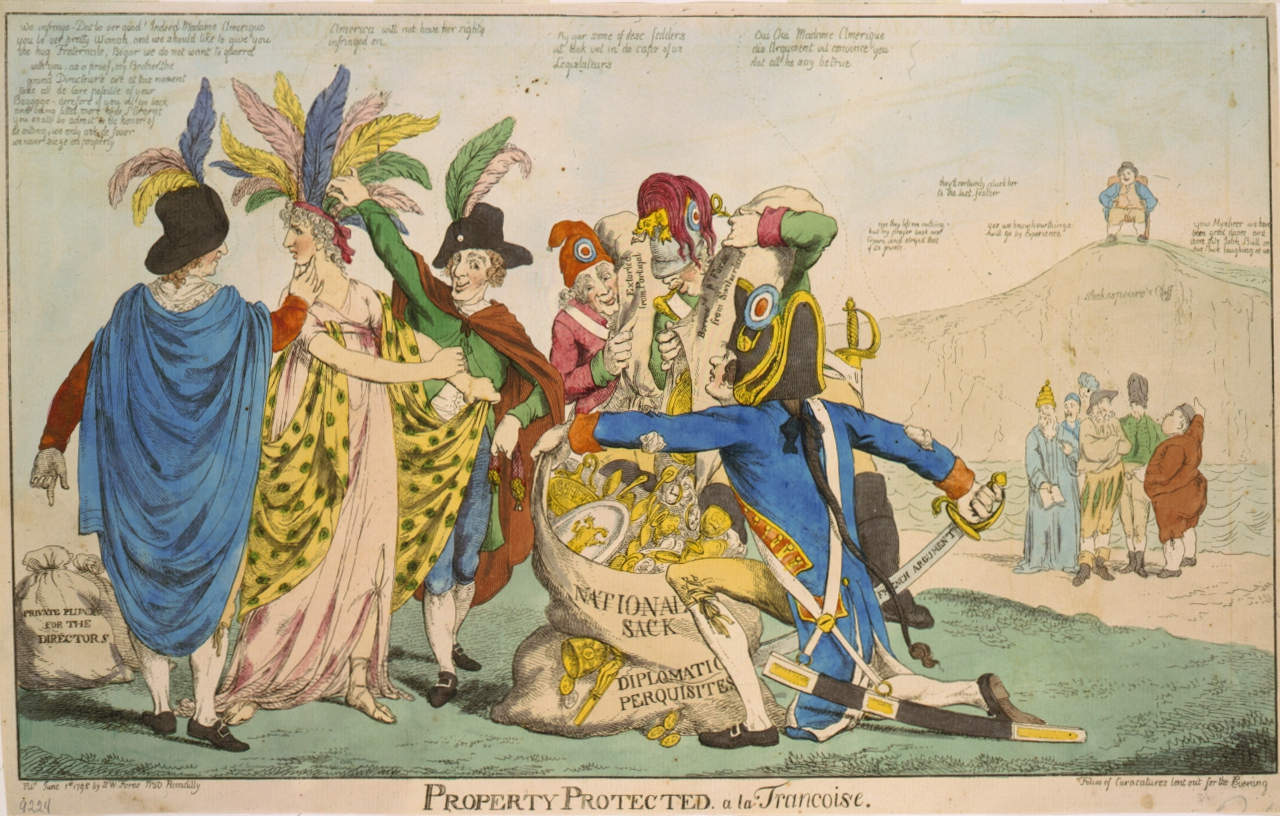
A 1798 political cartoon's depiction of the XYZ Affair with America as a female being plundered by Frenchmen

Historian Joseph Ellis writes that "[t]he Adams presidency was destined to be dominated by a single question of American policy to an extent seldom if ever encountered by any succeeding occupant of the office." That question was whether to make war with France or find peace. Britain and France were at war as a result of the French Revolution. Hamilton and the Federalists strongly favored the British monarchy against what they denounced as the political radicalism and anti-religious frenzy of the French Revolution. Jefferson and the Republicans, with their firm opposition to monarchy, strongly supported the French overthrowing their king. The French had supported Jefferson for president in 1796 and became belligerent at his loss. Adams continued Washington's policy of staying out of the war. Because of the Jay Treaty, the French saw America as Britain's junior partner and began seizing American merchant ships that were trading with the British. Most Americans were still pro-French due to France's assistance during the Revolution, the perceived humiliation of the Jay Treaty, and their desire to support a republic against the British monarchy, and would not tolerate war with France.

On May 16, 1797, Adams gave a speech to the House and Senate in which he called for increasing defense capabilities in case of war with France. He announced that he would send a peace commission to France but simultaneously called for a military buildup to counter any potential French threat. The speech was well received by the Federalists. Adams was depicted as an eagle holding an olive branch in one talon and the "emblems of defense" in the other. The Republicans were outraged, for Adams not only had failed to express support for the cause of the French Republic but appeared to be calling for war against it.

Sentiments changed with the XYZ Affair. The peace commission that Adams appointed consisted of John Marshall, Charles Cotesworth Pinckney and Elbridge Gerry. Jefferson met four times with Joseph Letombe, the French consul in Philadelphia. Letombe wrote to Paris stating that Jefferson had told him that it was in France's best interest to treat the American ministers civilly but "then drag out the negotiations at length" to arrive at most favorable solution. According to Letombe, Jefferson called Adams "vain, suspicious, and stubborn." When the envoys arrived in October, they were kept waiting for several days, and then granted only a 15-minute meeting with French Foreign Minister Talleyrand. The diplomats were then met by three of Talleyrand's agents (later code-named, X, Y, and Z), who refused to conduct negotiations unless the United States paid enormous bribes to France and to Talleyrand personally. Supposedly this was to make up for offenses given to France by Adams in his speech. The Americans refused to negotiate on such terms. Marshall and Pinckney returned home, while Gerry remained.

News of the disastrous peace mission arrived in a memorandum from Marshall on March 4, 1798. Adams, not wanting to incite violent impulses among the populace, announced that the mission had failed without providing details. He also sent a message to Congress asking for a renewal of the nation's defenses. The Republicans frustrated the President's defense measures. Suspecting that he might be hiding material favorable to France, Republicans in the House, with the support of Federalists who had heard rumors of what was contained in the messages, voted overwhelmingly to demand that Adams release the papers. Once they were released, the Republicans, according to Abigail, were "struck dumb." Benjamin Franklin Bache, editor of the Philadelphia Aurora, blamed Adams's aggression for the disaster. Among the general public however, the affair substantially weakened popular American support of France. Adams reached the height of his popularity as many in the country called for full-scale war against the French.

=== Alien and Sedition Acts ===
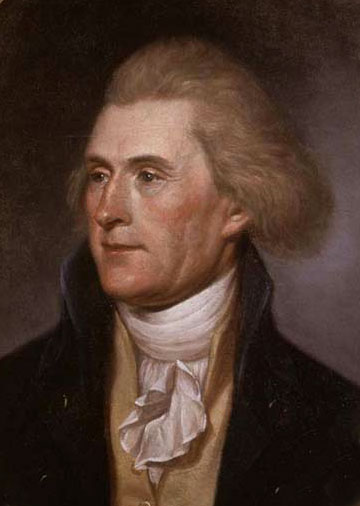
Thomas Jefferson, Adams's vice president, attempted to undermine many of his actions as president and eventually defeated him for reelection in the 1800 presidential election.

Despite the XYZ Affair, Republican opposition persisted. Federalists accused the French and their immigrants of provoking civil unrest. In an attempt to quell the outcry, the Federalists introduced, and the Congress passed, a series of laws collectively referred to as the Alien and Sedition Acts. Passage of the Naturalization Act, the Alien Friends Act, the Alien Enemies Act and the Sedition Act all came within a period of two weeks, in what Jefferson called an "unguarded passion." The first three acts targeted immigrants, specifically French, by giving the president greater deportation authority and increasing citizenship requirements. The Sedition Act made it a crime to publish "false, scandalous, and malicious writing" against the government or its officials. Adams had not promoted any of these acts, but signed them in June 1798 at the urging of his wife and cabinet.

The administration initiated fourteen or more indictments under the Sedition Act, as well as suits against five of the six most prominent Republican newspapers. The majority of the legal actions began in 1798 and 1799, and went to trial on the eve of the 1800 presidential election. Vocal opponents of the Federalists were imprisoned or fined under the Sedition Act for criticizing the government. Among them was Congressman Matthew Lyon of Vermont, who was sentenced to four months in jail for criticizing the President. The alien acts were not stringently enforced because Adams resisted Secretary of State Timothy Pickering's attempts to deport aliens, although many left on their own, largely in response to the hostile environment. Republicans were outraged. Jefferson, disgusted by the acts, wrote nothing publicly but partnered with Madison to secretly draft the Kentucky and Virginia Resolutions. Jefferson wrote for Kentucky that states had the "natural right" to nullify any acts they deemed unconstitutional. Writing to Madison, he speculated that as a last resort the states might have to "sever ourselves from the union we so much value." Federalists reacted bitterly to the resolutions, and the acts energized and unified the Republican Party while doing little to unite the Federalists.

=== Quasi-War ===
In May 1798, a French privateer captured a merchant vessel off New York Harbor. An increase in attacks at sea marked the beginning of the undeclared naval war known as the Quasi-War. Adams knew that America would be unable to win a major conflict, both because of its internal divisions and because France at the time was dominating the fight in most of Europe. He pursued a strategy whereby America harassed French ships in an effort sufficient to stem the French assaults on American interests. In May, shortly after the attack in New York, Congress created a separate Navy Department. The prospect of a French invasion led to calls to build up the army. Hamilton and other "High Federalists" were particularly adamant that a large army be called up, in spite of a common fear, particularly among Republicans, that large standing armies were subversive to liberty. In May, a provisional army of 10,000 soldiers was authorized by Congress. In July, Congress created twelve infantry regiments and provided for six cavalry companies, exceeding Adams's requests but falling short of Hamilton's.

Federalists pressured Adams to appoint Hamilton, who had served as Washington's aide-de-camp during the Revolution, to command the army. Distrustful of Hamilton and fearing a plot to subvert his administration, Adams chose Washington without consulting him. As a condition of his acceptance, Washington demanded that he be permitted to appoint his own subordinates. He wished to have Henry Knox as second-in-command, followed by Hamilton, and then Charles Pinckney. On June 2, Hamilton wrote to Washington stating that he would not serve unless he was made Inspector General and second-in-command. Washington conceded that Hamilton, despite holding a rank lower than Knox and Pinckney, had, by serving on his staff, more opportunity to comprehend the whole military scene, and should therefore outrank them. Adams sent Secretary of War James McHenry to Mount Vernon to convince Washington to accept the post. McHenry put forth his opinion that Washington would not serve unless permitted to choose his own officers. Adams had intended to appoint Republicans Burr and Frederick Muhlenberg to make the army appear bipartisan. Washington's list consisted entirely of Federalists. Adams relented and agreed to submit to the Senate the names of Hamilton, Pinckney, and Knox, in that order, although final decisions of rank would be reserved to Adams. Knox refused to serve under these conditions. Adams intended to give to Hamilton the lowest possible rank, while Washington and many other Federalists insisted that the order in which the names had been submitted to the Senate must determine seniority. On September 21, Adams received a letter from McHenry relaying a statement from Washington threatening to resign if Hamilton were not made second-in-command. Fearing Federalist backlash, Adams capitulated, despite bitter resentment. The illness of Abigail, who Adams feared was near death, exacerbated his suffering.

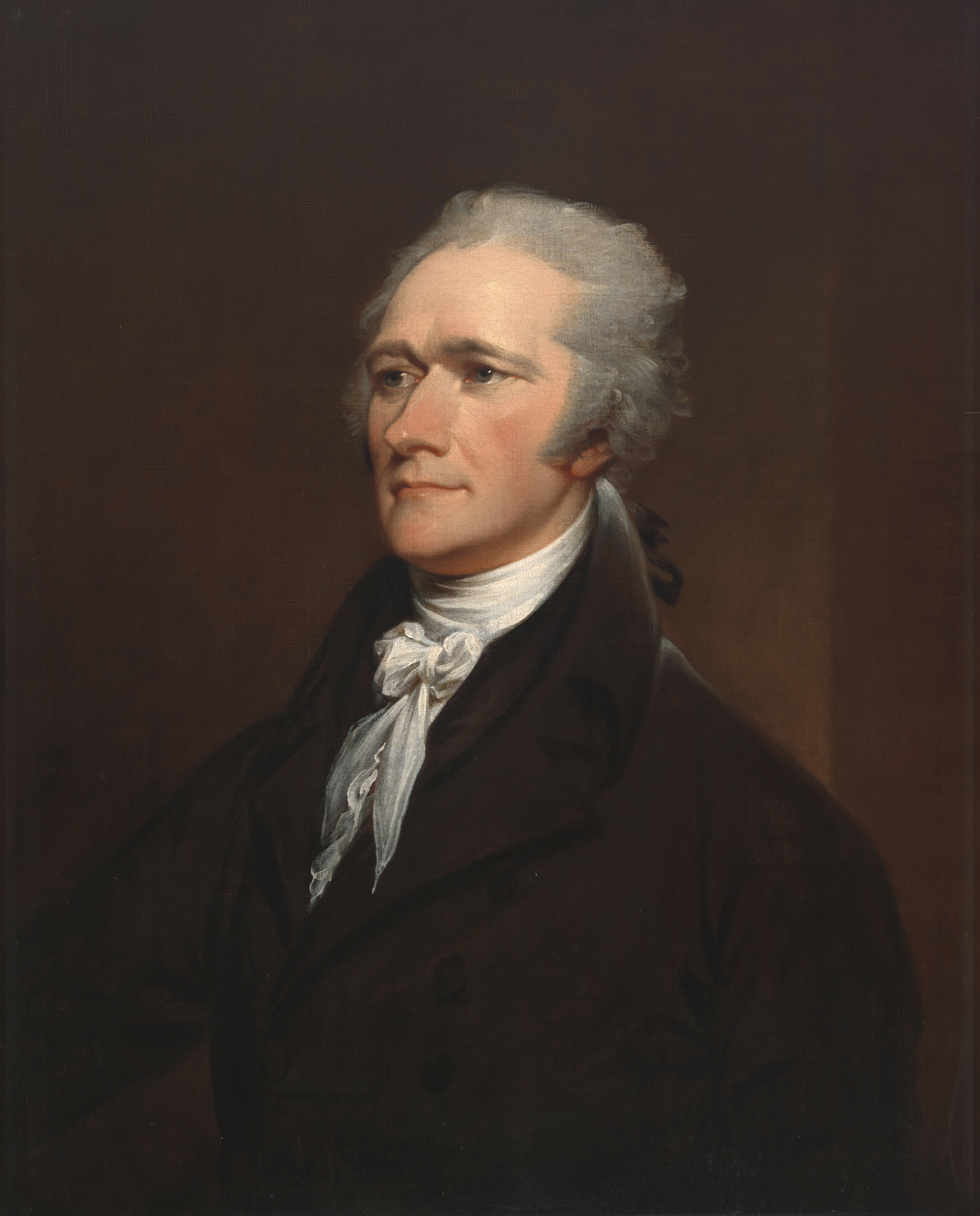
Alexander Hamilton's desire for high military rank and his push for war with France put him into conflict with Adams.

It quickly became apparent that due to Washington's advanced age, Hamilton was the army's de facto commander. He exerted effective control over the War Department, taking over supplies for the army. Meanwhile, Adams built up the Navy, adding six fast, powerful frigates, most notably the USS Constitution. The Quasi-War continued, but there was a decline in war fever beginning in the fall once news arrived of the French defeat at the Battle of the Nile, which many Americans hoped would make them more disposed to negotiate. In October, Adams heard from Gerry in Paris that the French wanted to make peace and would properly receive an American delegation. That December in his address to Congress, Adams relayed these statements while expressing the need to maintain adequate defenses. The speech angered both Federalists, including Hamilton, many of whom had wanted a request for a declaration of war, and Republicans. Hamilton secretly promoted a plan, already rejected by Adams, in which American and British troops would jointly seize Spanish Florida and Louisiana, ostensibly to deter a possible French invasion. Hamilton's critics, including Abigail, saw in his military buildups the signs of an aspiring military dictator.

On February 18, 1799, Adams nominated diplomat William Vans Murray for a peace mission to France without consulting either his cabinet or Abigail, who nonetheless upon hearing of it described it as a "master stroke." To placate Republicans, he nominated Patrick Henry and Ellsworth to accompany Murray, and the Senate immediately approved them on March 3. Henry declined the nomination and Adams chose William Richardson Davie to replace him. Hamilton strongly criticized the decision, as did Adams's cabinet members, who maintained frequent communication with him. Adams again questioned their loyalty but did not remove them. To the annoyance of many, Adams spent March to September 1799 in Peacefield. He returned to Trenton, where the government had set up temporary quarters due to the yellow fever epidemic, after a letter arrived from Talleyrand confirming that American ministers would be received. Adams then decided to send the commissioners to France. Adams arrived in Trenton on October 10. Shortly after, Hamilton, in a breach of military protocol, arrived uninvited in the city to speak with the President, urging him not to send the peace commissioners but instead to ally with Britain to restore the Bourbons. "I heard him with perfect good humor, though never in my life did I hear a man talk more like a fool," Adams said. On November 15, the commissioners set sail for Paris.

=== Fries's Rebellion ===
To pay for the military buildup of the Quasi-War, Adams and his Federalist allies enacted the Direct Tax of 1798. Direct taxation by the federal government was widely unpopular, and the government's revenue under Washington had mostly come from excise taxes and tariffs. Though Washington had maintained a balanced budget with the help of a growing economy, increased military expenditures threatened to cause major budget deficits, and the Federalists developed a taxation plan to meet the need for increased government revenue. The Direct Tax of 1798 instituted a progressive land value tax of up to 1% of a property's value. Taxpayers in eastern Pennsylvania resisted federal tax collectors, and in March 1799 the bloodless Fries's Rebellion broke out. Led by Revolutionary War veteran John Fries, rural German-speaking farmers protested what they saw as a threat to their liberties. They intimidated tax collectors, who often found themselves unable to go about their business. The disturbance was quickly ended with Hamilton leading the army to restore peace.

Fries and two other leaders were arrested, found guilty of treason, and sentenced to hang. They appealed to Adams requesting a pardon. The cabinet unanimously advised Adams to refuse, but he instead granted the pardon, arguing the men had instigated a mere riot as opposed to a rebellion. In his pamphlet attacking Adams before the election, Hamilton wrote that "it was impossible to commit a greater error."

=== Federalist divisions and peace ===
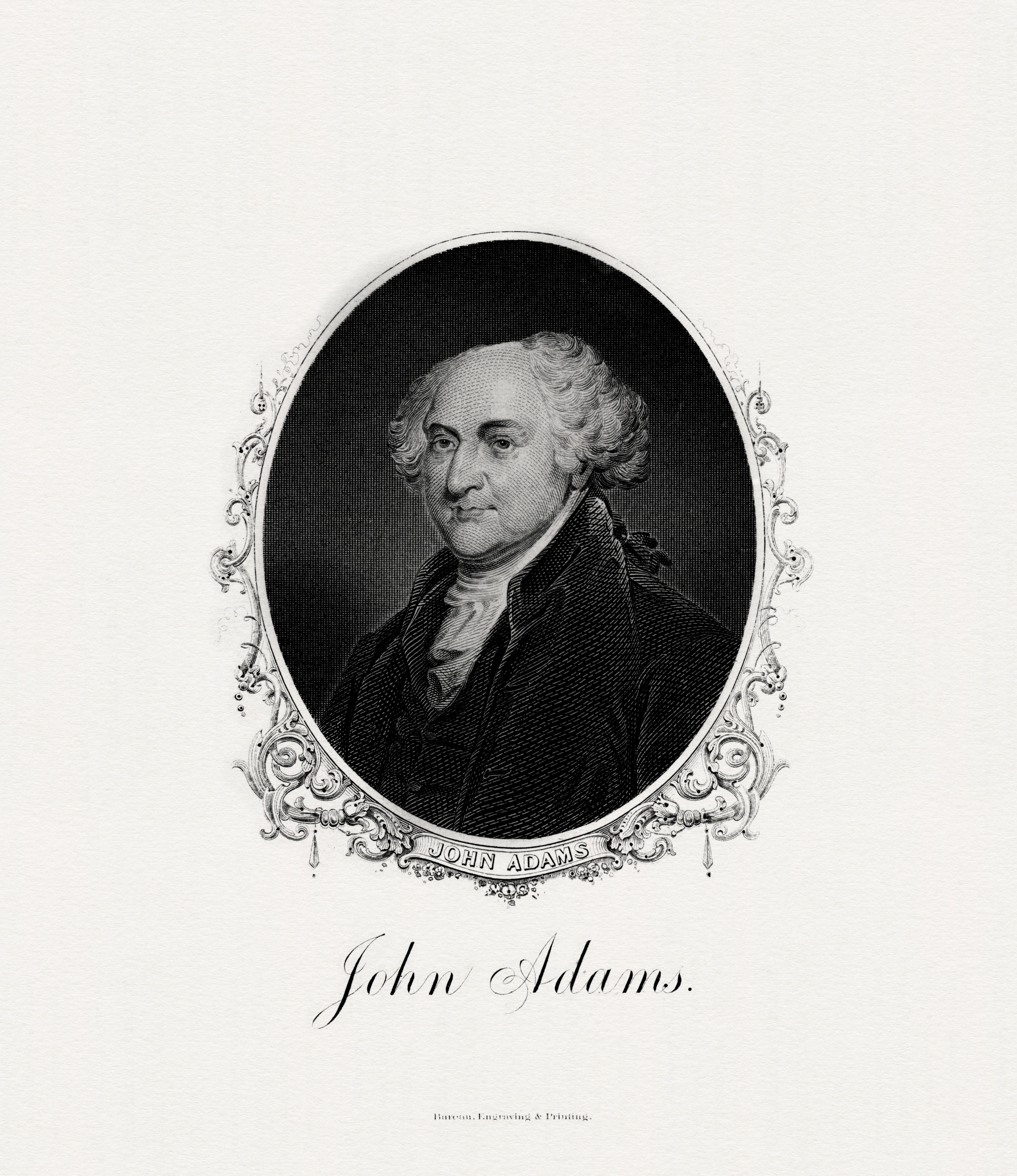
An engraved portrait of Adams as president by the Bureau of Engraving and Printing

On May 5, 1800, Adams's frustrations with the Hamilton wing of the party exploded during a meeting with McHenry, a Hamilton loyalist who was universally regarded, even by Hamilton, as an inept Secretary of War. Adams accused him of subservience to Hamilton and declared that he would rather serve as Jefferson's vice president or minister at The Hague than be beholden to Hamilton for the presidency. McHenry offered to resign at once, and Adams accepted. On May 10, he asked Pickering to resign. Pickering refused and was summarily dismissed. Adams named John Marshall as Secretary of State and Samuel Dexter as Secretary of War. In 1799, Napoleon took over as head of the French government in the Coup of 18 Brumaire and declared the French Revolution over. News of this event increased Adams's desire to disband the provisional army, which, with Washington now dead, was commanded only by Hamilton. His moves to end the army after the departures of McHenry and Pickering were met with little opposition. Federalists joined with Republicans in voting to disband the army in mid-1800.

Napoleon, determining that further conflict was pointless, signaled his readiness for friendly relations. By the Convention of 1800, the two sides agreed to return any captured ships and to allow for the peaceful transfer of non-military goods to an enemy of the nation. On January 23, 1801, the Senate voted 16–14 in favor of the treaty, four votes short of the necessary two thirds. Some Federalists, including Hamilton, urged that the Senate vote in favor of the treaty with reservations. A new proposal was then drawn up demanding that the Treaty of Alliance of 1778 be superseded and that France pay for its damages to American property. On February 3, the treaty with the reservations passed 22–9 and was signed by Adams. (Note: Jefferson, after entering office, approved a negotiated end to the 1778 alliance, freeing the United States of foreign entanglements, while excusing France from paying indemnities.) News of the peace treaty did not arrive in the United States until after the election, too late to sway the results.

As president, Adams proudly avoided war, but deeply split his party in the process. Historian Ron Chernow writes that "the threat of Jacobinism" was the one thing that united the Federalist Party, and that Adams's elimination of it unwittingly contributed to the party's demise.

=== Establishing government institutions and move to Washington ===
Adams's leadership on naval defense has sometimes led him to be called the "father of the American Navy." In July 1798, he signed into law An Act for the relief of sick and disabled seamen, which authorized the establishment of a government-operated marine hospital service. In 1800, he signed the law establishing the Library of Congress.

Adams made his first official visit to the nation's new seat of government in early June 1800. Amid the "raw and unfinished" cityscape, the President found the public buildings "in a much greater forwardness of completion than expected." He moved into the nearly completed President's Mansion (later known as the White House) on November 1. Abigail arrived a few weeks later. On arrival, Adams wrote to her, "Before I end my letter, I pray Heaven to bestow the best of Blessings on this House and all that shall hereafter inhabit it. May none but honest and wise Men ever rule under this roof." The Senate of the 7th Congress met for the first time in the new Congress House (later known as the Capitol building) on November 17, 1800. On November 22, Adams delivered his fourth State of the Union Address to a joint session of Congress. This would be the last annual message any president would personally deliver to Congress for the next 113 years.

=== Election of 1800 ===
The 1800 United States presidential election results in which Adams was defeated by Thomas Jefferson

With the Federalist Party deeply split over his negotiations with France, and the opposition Republican Party enraged over the Alien and Sedition Acts and the expansion of the military, Adams faced a daunting reelection campaign in 1800. The Federalist congressmen caucused in the spring of 1800 and nominated Adams and Pinckney. The Republicans nominated Jefferson and Burr, their candidates in the previous election.

The campaign was bitter and characterized by malicious insults by partisan presses on both sides. Federalists claimed that the Republicans were the enemies of "all who love order, peace, virtue, and religion." They were said to be libertines and dangerous radicals who favored states' rights over the Union and would instigate anarchy and civil war. Jefferson's rumored affairs with slaves were used against him. Republicans accused Federalists of subverting republican principles through punitive federal laws and of favoring Britain and the other coalition countries in their war with France to promote aristocratic, anti-republican values. Jefferson was portrayed as an apostle of liberty and man of the people, while Adams was labelled a monarchist. He was accused of insanity and marital infidelity. James T. Callender, a Republican propagandist secretly financed by Jefferson, degraded Adams's character and accused him of attempting to make war with France. Callender was arrested and jailed under the Sedition Act, which further inflamed Republican passions.

Opposition from the Federalist Party was at times equally intense. Some, including Pickering, accused Adams of colluding with Jefferson so that he would end up either president or vice president. Hamilton was hard at work, attempting to sabotage the President's reelection. Planning an indictment of Adams's character, he requested and received private documents from both the ousted cabinet secretaries and Wolcott. The letter was intended for only a few Federalist electors. Upon seeing a draft, several Federalists urged Hamilton not to send it. Wolcott wrote that "the poor old man" could do himself in without Hamilton's assistance. Hamilton did not heed their advice. On October 24, he sent a pamphlet strongly attacking Adams's policies and character. Hamilton denounced the "precipitate nomination" of Murray, the pardoning of Fries, and the firing of Pickering. He vilified the President's "disgusting egotism" and "ungovernable temper." Adams, he concluded, was "emotionally unstable, given to impulsive and irrational decisions, unable to coexist with his closest advisers, and generally unfit to be president." Strangely, it ended by saying that the electors should support Adams and Pinckney equally. Thanks to Burr, who had covertly obtained a copy, the pamphlet became public knowledge and was distributed throughout the country by Republicans. The pamphlet ended Hamilton's political career and helped ensure Adams's already likely defeat.

When the electoral votes were counted, Adams finished third with 65 votes, and Pinckney came in fourth with 64 votes. Jefferson and Burr tied for first with 73 votes each. Because of the tie, the election devolved upon the House of Representatives, with each state having one vote and a majority required for victory. On February 17, 1801—on the 36th ballot—Jefferson was elected by a vote of 10 to 4 (two states abstained). Hamilton's scheme, although it made the Federalists appear divided and therefore helped Jefferson win, failed in its overall attempt to woo Federalist electors away from Adams. (Note: Ferling attributes Adams's defeat to five factors: the stronger organization of the Republicans; Federalist disunity; the controversy surrounding the Alien and Sedition Acts; the popularity of Jefferson in the South; and the effective politicking of Burr in New York. Adams wrote, "No party that ever existed knew itself so little or so vainly overrated its own influence and popularity as ours. None ever understood so ill the causes of its own power, or so wantonly destroyed them." Stephen G. Kurtz argues that Hamilton and his supporters were primarily responsible for the destruction of the Federalist Party. They viewed the party as a personal tool and played into the hands of the Jeffersonians by building up a large standing army and creating a feud with Adams. Chernow writes that Hamilton believed that by eliminating Adams, he could eventually pick up the pieces of the ruined Federalist Party and lead it back to dominance: "Better to purge Adams and let Jefferson govern for a while than to water down the party's ideological purity with compromises.")

To compound the agony of his defeat, Adams's son Charles, a long-time alcoholic, died on November 30. Anxious to rejoin Abigail, who had already left for Massachusetts, Adams departed the White House in the predawn hours of March 4, 1801, and did not attend Jefferson's inauguration. Including him, only five out-going presidents (having served a full term) have not attended their successors' inaugurations. The complications of the 1796 and 1800 elections prompted a modification to the Electoral College through the 12th Amendment.

=== Cabinet ===
Adams cabinet
Office	Name	Term
President	John Adams	1797–1801
Vice President	Thomas Jefferson	1797–1801
Secretary of State	Timothy Pickering	1797–1800
John Marshall	1800–1801
Secretary of the Treasury	Oliver Wolcott Jr.	1797–1800
Samuel Dexter	1801
Secretary of War	James McHenry	1797–1800
Samuel Dexter	1800–1801
Attorney General	Charles Lee	1797–1801
Secretary of the Navy	Benjamin Stoddert	1798–1801

=== Judicial appointments ===
John Marshall, the fourth Chief Justice of the U.S. Supreme Court, was one of Adams's few dependable allies.

Supreme Court appointments by President Adams
Position	Name	Term
Chief Justice	John Marshall	1801–1835
Associate Justice	Bushrod Washington	1799–1829
Alfred Moore	1800–1804

Adams appointed two U.S. Supreme Court associate justices during his term in office: Bushrod Washington, the nephew of George Washington, and Alfred Moore. After Ellsworth's retirement due to ill health in 1800, it fell to Adams to appoint the Court's fourth Chief Justice. At the time, it was not yet certain whether Jefferson or Burr would win the election. Regardless, Adams believed that the choice should be someone "in the full vigor of middle age" who could counter what might be a long line of successive Republican presidents. Adams chose his Secretary of State John Marshall. He, along with Stoddert, was one of Adams's few trusted cabinet members, and was among the first to greet him when he arrived at the White House. Adams signed his commission on January 31 and the Senate approved it immediately. Marshall's long tenure left a lasting influence on the Court. He maintained a carefully reasoned nationalistic interpretation of the Constitution and established the judicial branch as the equal of the executive and legislative branches.

After the Federalists lost control of both houses of Congress along with the White House in the election of 1800, the lame-duck session of the 6th Congress in February 1801 approved a judiciary act, commonly known as the Midnight Judges Act, which created a set of federal appeals courts between the district courts and the Supreme Court. Adams filled the vacancies created in this statute by appointing a series of judges, whom his opponents called the "Midnight Judges", just days before his term expired. Most of these judges lost their posts when the 7th Congress, with a solid Republican majority, approved the Judiciary Act of 1802, abolishing the newly created courts.

== Post-presidency (1801–1826) ==
=== Initial retirement years ===
Adams resumed farming at Peacefield in Quincy, Massachusetts, and also began work on an autobiography. The work had numerous gaps and was eventually abandoned and left unedited. Most of Adams's attention was focused on farm work, although he mostly left manual labor to hired hands. His frugal lifestyle and presidential salary gave him a considerable fortune by 1801. In 1803, Bird, Savage & Bird, the bank holding his cash reserves of about $13,000, collapsed. John Quincy resolved the crisis by buying his properties in Weymouth and Quincy, including Peacefield, for $12,800. During his first four years of retirement, Adams made little effort to contact others, but eventually resumed contact with old acquaintances such as Benjamin Waterhouse and Benjamin Rush.

Adams generally stayed quiet on public matters. He did not publicly denounce Jefferson's actions as president, believing that "instead of opposing Systematically any Administration, running down their Characters and opposing all their Measures right or wrong, We ought to Support every Administration as far as We can in Justice." When a disgruntled James Callender, angry at not being appointed to an office, turned on the President by revealing the Sally Hemings affair, Adams said nothing. John Quincy was elected to the Senate in 1803. Shortly thereafter, both he and his father crossed party lines to support Jefferson's Louisiana Purchase. The only major political incident involving the elder Adams during the Jefferson years was a dispute with Mercy Otis Warren in 1806. Warren, an old friend, had written a history of the American Revolution attacking Adams for his "partiality for monarchy" and "pride of talents and much ambition." A tempestuous correspondence ensued between her and Adams. In time, their friendship healed. Adams did privately criticize the President over his Embargo Act, although John Quincy voted for it. John Quincy resigned from the Senate in 1808 after the Federalist-controlled Massachusetts Senate refused to nominate him for a second term. After the Federalists denounced John Quincy as no longer being of their party, Adams wrote to him that he himself had long since "abdicated and disclaimed the name and character and attributes of that sect."

After Jefferson's retirement in 1809, Adams became more vocal. He published a three-year marathon of letters in the Boston Patriot newspaper, refuting line-by-line Hamilton's 1800 pamphlet. The initial piece was written shortly after his return from Peacefield and "had gathered dust for eight years." Adams had decided to shelve it over fears that it could negatively impact John Quincy should he ever seek office. Although Hamilton had died in 1804 in a duel with Aaron Burr, Adams felt the need to vindicate his character against his charges. With John Quincy having broken from the Federalist Party and joined the Republicans, he felt that he could safely do so without threatening his political career. Adams supported the War of 1812. Having worried over the rise of sectionalism, he celebrated the growth of a "national character" that accompanied it. Adams supported James Madison for reelection to the presidency in 1812.

Adams's daughter Abigail ("Nabby") was married to William Stephens Smith, but she returned to her parents' home after the failure of the marriage; she died of breast cancer in 1813.

=== Correspondence with Jefferson ===
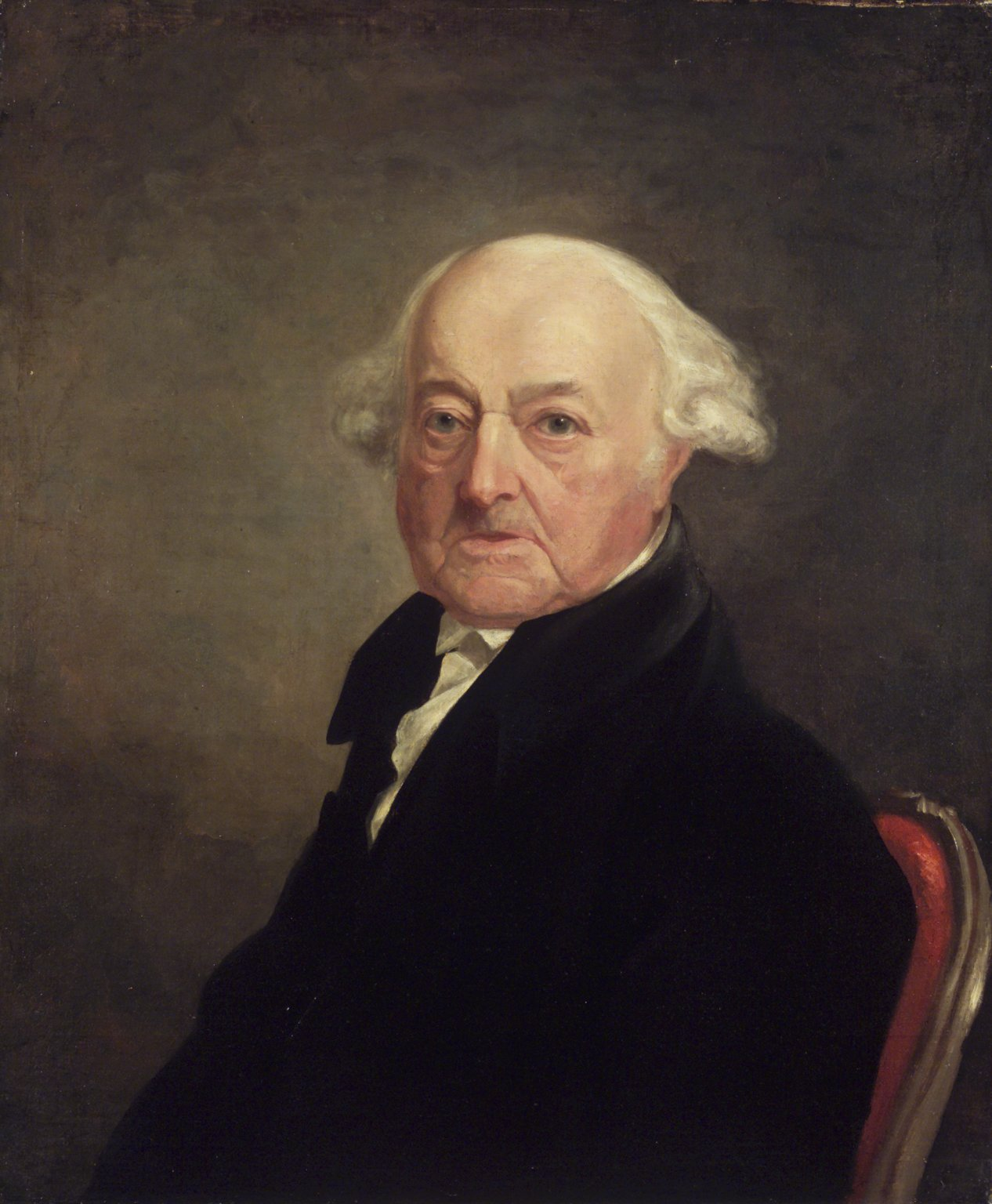
John Adams, a c. 1816 portrait by Samuel Morse now on display at the Brooklyn Museum of Art

In early 1801, Adams sent Thomas Jefferson a brief note wishing him a happy and prosperous presidency. Jefferson failed to respond, and they did not speak again for nearly 12 years. In 1804, Abigail, unbeknownst to her husband, wrote to Jefferson to express her condolences upon the death of his daughter Polly, who had stayed with the Adamses in London in 1787. This initiated a brief correspondence between the two which quickly descended into political rancor. Jefferson terminated it by not replying to Abigail's fourth letter. Aside from that, by 1812 there had been no communication between Monticello, the home of Jefferson, and Peacefield since Adams left office.

In early 1812, Adams reconciled with Jefferson. The previous year had been tragic for Adams; his brother-in-law and friend Richard Cranch had died along with his widow Mary, and Nabby had been diagnosed with breast cancer. These events mellowed Adams and caused him to soften his outlook. Their mutual friend Benjamin Rush, who had been corresponding with both, encouraged them to reach out to each other. On New Year's Day, Adams sent a brief, friendly note to Jefferson to accompany a two-volume collection of lectures on rhetoric by John Quincy Adams. Jefferson replied immediately with a cordial letter, and the two revived their friendship, which they sustained by mail. Their correspondence lasted the rest of their lives, and has been hailed as among the great legacies of American literature. Their letters represent an insight into both the period and the minds of the two revolutionary leaders and presidents. The missives lasted fourteen years, and consisted of 158 letters—109 from Adams and 49 from Jefferson.

Early on, Adams repeatedly tried to turn the correspondence to a discussion of their actions in the political arena. Jefferson refused to oblige him, saying that "nothing new can be added by you or me to what has been said by others and will be said in every age." Adams made one more attempt, writing that "You and I ought not to die before we have explained ourselves to each other." Still, Jefferson declined to engage Adams in this sort of discussion. Adams accepted this, and the correspondence turned to other matters, particularly philosophy and their daily habits. (Note: The two men discussed "natural aristocracy". Jefferson said, "The natural aristocracy I consider as the most precious gift of nature for the instruction, the trusts, and government of society. And indeed it would have been inconsistent in creation to have formed man for the social state, and not to have provided virtue and wisdom enough to manage the concerns of society. May we not even say that the form of government is best which provides most effectually for a pure selection of these natural [aristocrats] into the offices of government?" Adams wondered if it ever would be so clear who these people were, "Your distinction between natural and artificial aristocracy does not appear to me well founded. Birth and wealth are conferred on some men as imperiously by nature, as genius, strength, or beauty. ... When aristocracies are established by human laws and honour, wealth, and power are made hereditary by municipal laws and political institutions, then I acknowledge artificial aristocracy to commence." It would always be true, Adams argued, that fate would bestow influence on some men for reasons other than wisdom and virtue. A good government had to account for that reality.)

As the two grew older, the letters grew fewer and farther between. There was also important information that each man kept to himself. Jefferson said nothing about his construction of a new house, domestic turmoil, slave ownership, or poor financial situation, while Adams did not mention the troublesome behavior of his son Thomas, who had failed as a lawyer and become an alcoholic, resorting afterwards to living primarily as a caretaker at Peacefield.

=== Last years and death ===
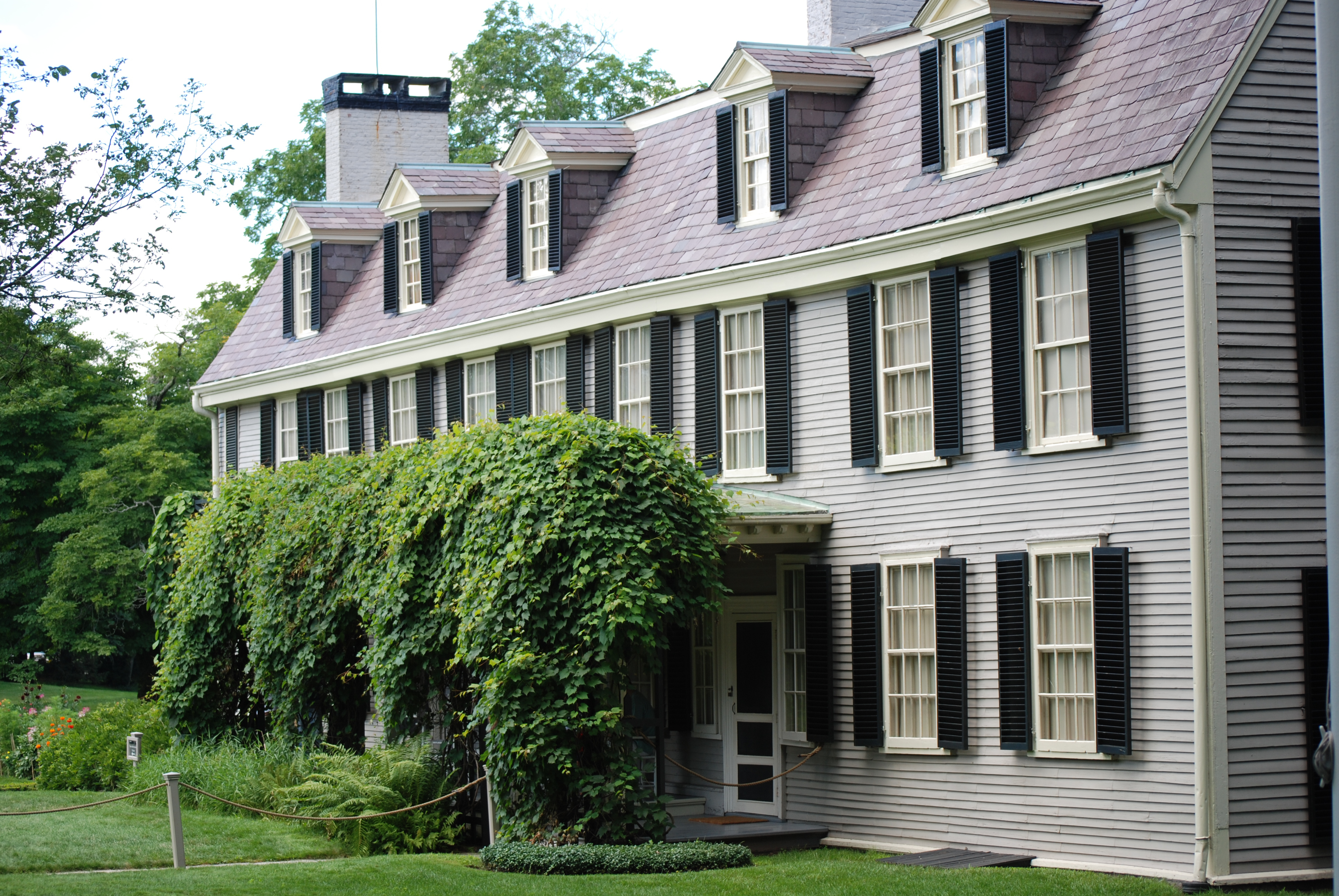
Peacefield, John and Abigail Adams's home in Quincy, Massachusetts

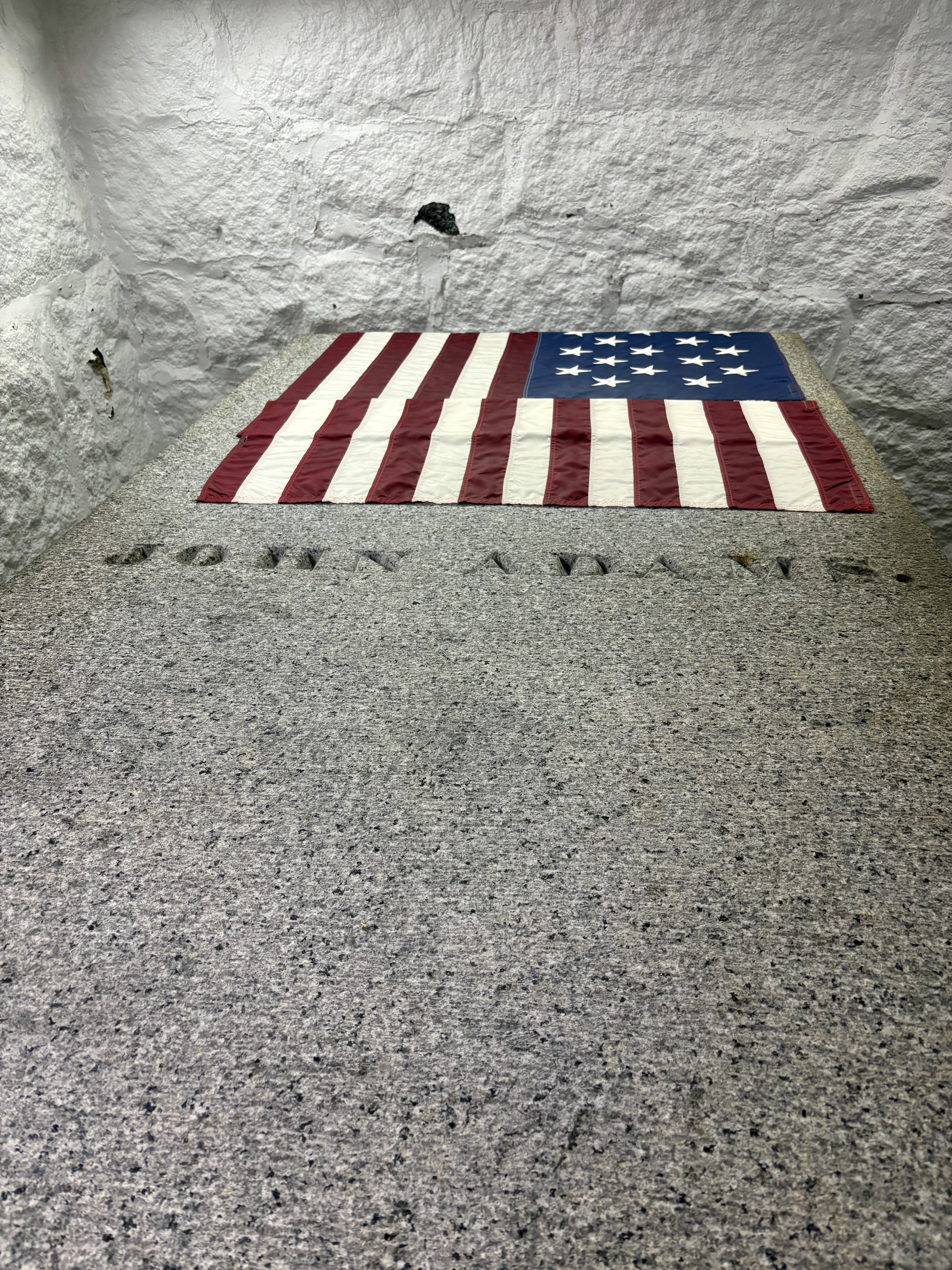
The tomb of John Adams at United First Parish Church

Abigail died of typhoid on October 28, 1818, at Peacefield. 1824 was filled with excitement in America, featuring a four-way presidential contest that included John Quincy. The Marquis de Lafayette toured the country and met with Adams, who greatly enjoyed Lafayette's visit to Peacefield. Adams was delighted by the election of John Quincy to the presidency. The results became official in February 1825 after a deadlock was decided in the House of Representatives. He remarked, "No man who ever held the office of President would congratulate a friend on obtaining it."

On July 4, 1826, the 50th anniversary of the adoption of the Declaration of Independence, Adams died of a heart attack at Peacefield at approximately 6:20 pm. His last words included an acknowledgement of his longtime friend and rival: "Thomas Jefferson survives." Adams was unaware that Jefferson had died several hours before. At 90, Adams was the longest-lived US president until Ronald Reagan surpassed him in 2001.

John and Abigail Adams's crypt at United First Parish Church in Quincy also contains the bodies of John Quincy and Louisa Adams.

== Political writings ==
=== Thoughts on Government ===
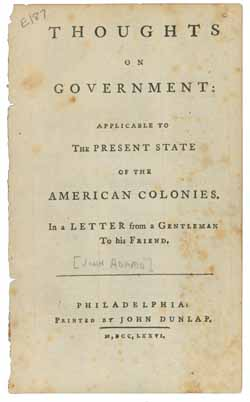
Thoughts on Government, a pamphlet written by Adams in 1776

During the First Continental Congress, Adams was sometimes solicited for his views on government. While recognizing its importance, Adams had privately criticized Thomas Paine's 1776 pamphlet Common Sense, which attacked all forms of monarchy, even constitutional monarchy of the sort advocated by John Locke. It supported a unicameral legislature and a weak executive elected by the legislature. According to Adams, the author had "a better hand at pulling down than building." He believed that the views expressed in the pamphlet were "so democratical, without any restraint or even an attempt at any equilibrium or counter poise, that it must produce confusion and every evil work." What Paine advocated was a radical democracy, incompatible with the system of checks and balances that conservatives like Adams would implement. At the urging of some delegates, Adams committed his views to paper in separate letters. So impressed was Richard Henry Lee that, with Adams's consent, he had the most comprehensive letter printed. Published anonymously in April 1776, it was titled Thoughts on Government and styled as "a Letter from a Gentleman to his Friend." Many historians agree that none of Adams's other compositions rivaled the enduring influence of this pamphlet.

Adams advised that the form of government should be chosen to attain the desired ends—the happiness and virtue of the greatest number of people. He wrote, "There is no good government but what is republican. That the only valuable part of the British constitution is so because the very definition of a republic is an empire of laws, and not of men." The treatise defended bicameralism, for "a single assembly is liable to all the vices, follies and frailties of an individual." Adams suggested that there should be a separation of powers between the executive, the judicial and the legislative branches, and further recommended that if a continental government were to be formed then it "should sacredly be confined" to certain enumerated powers. Thoughts on Government was referenced in every state-constitution writing hall. Adams used the letter to attack opponents of independence. He claimed that John Dickinson's fear of republicanism was responsible for his refusal to support independence, and that opposition from Southern planters was rooted in fear that their aristocratic slaveholding status would be endangered.

=== Massachusetts Constitution ===
After returning from his first mission to France in 1779, Adams was elected to the Massachusetts Constitutional Convention with the purpose of establishing a new constitution for Massachusetts. He served on a committee of three, also including Samuel Adams and James Bowdoin, to draft the constitution. The writing fell primarily to John Adams. The resulting Constitution of Massachusetts was approved in 1780. It was the first constitution written by a special committee, then ratified by the people, and was the first to feature a bicameral legislature. Included were a distinct executive—though restrained by an executive council—with a qualified (two-thirds) veto, and an independent judicial branch. The judges were given lifetime appointments, to "hold their offices during good behavior."

The Constitution affirmed the "duty" of the individual to worship the "Supreme Being," and the right to do so without molestation "in the manner most agreeable to the dictates of his own conscience." It established free public education for three years to the children of all citizens. Adams was a strong believer in education as a pillar of the Enlightenment. He believed that people "in a State of Ignorance" were more easily enslaved while those "enlightened with knowledge" would be better able to protect their liberties.

=== Defence of the Constitutions ===
Adams's preoccupation with political and governmental affairs, which caused considerable separation from his wife and children, had a distinct familial context, which he articulated in 1780: "I must study Politicks and War that my sons may have the liberty to study Mathematicks and Philosophy. My sons ought to study Geography, natural History, Naval Architecture, navigation, Commerce and Agriculture, in order to give their children a right to study Painting, Poetry, Musick, Architecture, Statuary, Tapestry, and Porcelaine."

While in London, Adams learned of a convention being planned to amend the Articles of Confederation. In January 1787, he published a work entitled A Defence of the Constitutions of Government of the United States. The pamphlet repudiated the views of Turgot and other European writers as to the viciousness of state government frameworks. He suggested that "the rich, the well-born and the able" should be set apart from other men in a senate—that would prevent them from dominating the lower house. Adams's Defence is described as an articulation of the theory of mixed government. Adams contended that social classes exist in every political society, and that a good government must accept that reality. For centuries, a mixed regime balancing monarchy, aristocracy, and democracy was required to preserve order and liberty.

Historian Gordon S. Wood maintained that Adams's political philosophy had become irrelevant by the time the Federal Constitution was ratified. By then, American political thought, transformed by more than a decade of vigorous debate as well as formative experiential pressures, had abandoned the classical perception of politics as a mirror of social estates. Americans' new understanding of popular sovereignty was that the citizenry were the sole possessors of power in the nation. Representatives in the government enjoyed mere portions of the people's power and only for a limited time. Adams was thought to have overlooked this evolution and revealed his continued attachment to the older version of politics. Yet Wood was accused of ignoring Adams's peculiar definition of the term "republic", and his support for a constitution ratified by the people.

On separation of powers, Adams wrote that, "Power must be opposed to power, and interest to interest." This sentiment was later echoed by James Madison's statement that, "[a]mbition must be made to counteract ambition", in Federalist No. 51, explaining the separation of powers established under the new Constitution. Adams believed that humans naturally wanted to further their own ambitions, and a single democratically elected house, if left unchecked, would be subject to this error; it needed to be checked by an upper house and an executive. He wrote that a strong executive would defend the people's liberties against "aristocrats" attempting to take them away.

Adams first saw the new United States Constitution in late 1787. To Jefferson, he wrote that he read it "with great satisfaction." Adams expressed regret that the president would be unable to make appointments without Senate approval and over the absence of a Bill of Rights.

== Political philosophy and views ==
=== Slavery ===
Adams never owned a slave nor used slave labor, saying:

I have, through my whole life, held the practice of slavery in such abhorrence, that I have never owned a negro or any other slave, though I have lived for many years in times, when the practice was not disgraceful, when the best men in my vicinity thought it not inconsistent with their character, and when it has cost me thousands of dollars for the labor and subsistence of free men, which I might have saved by the purchase of negroes at times when they were very cheap.

Before the war, he occasionally represented slaves in suits for their freedom. Adams generally tried to keep the issue out of national politics, because of the anticipated Southern response during a time when unity was needed to achieve independence. He spoke out in 1777 against a bill to emancipate slaves in Massachusetts, saying that the issue was presently too divisive so the legislation should "sleep for a time." He was against use of black soldiers in the Revolution due to opposition from Southerners. Slavery was abolished in Massachusetts about 1780, when it was forbidden by implication in the Declaration of Rights that John Adams wrote into the Massachusetts Constitution. Abigail Adams vocally opposed slavery.

=== Monarchism ===
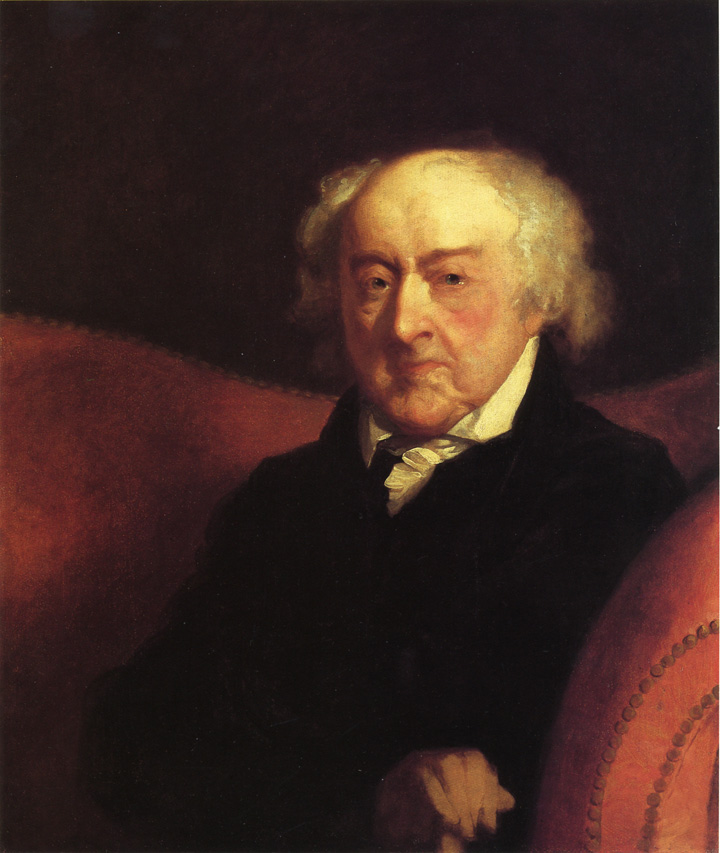
John Adams, an 1823 portrait by Gilbert Stuart completed at the request of his son, John Quincy, was the last portrait of Adams.

Adams expressed controversial and shifting views regarding the virtues of monarchical and hereditary political institutions. At times he conveyed substantial support for these approaches, suggesting for example that "hereditary monarchy or aristocracy" are the "only institutions that can possibly preserve the laws and liberties of the people." At other times he distanced himself from such ideas, calling himself "a mortal and irreconcilable enemy to Monarchy". Such denials did not assuage his critics, and Adams was often accused of being a monarchist. Historian Clinton Rossiter portrays Adams as a revolutionary conservative who sought to balance republicanism with the stability of monarchy to create "ordered liberty." His 1790 Discourses on Davila published in the Gazette of the United States warned once again of the dangers of unbridled democracy.

Many attacks on Adams were scurrilous, including suggestions that he was planning to "crown himself king" and "grooming John Quincy as heir to the throne." Adams felt that the great danger was that an oligarchy of the wealthy would take hold to the detriment of equality. To counter that danger, the power of the wealthy needed to be channeled by institutions, and checked by a strong executive.

=== Religious views ===
Adams's views on religion are considered complex as he took a middle course between Deism and Calvinism that led him towards Unitarianism, which denied the Trinity and the divinity of Jesus Christ. In Quincy, the Unitarian faction was dominant and included Adams and his father. In 1825, the Unitarians split off as a separate denomination, which included John Adams. According to biographer David McCullough, "Adams was both a devout Christian and an independent thinker, and he saw no conflict in that."

Adams was raised in the Congregational church. Adams's family descended from Puritans. Strict Puritanism had profoundly shaped New England's culture, laws, and traditions, and Adams praised the historical Puritans as "bearers of freedom, a cause that still had a holy urgency". He believed that regular church service was beneficial to man's moral sense. Some scholars describe Adams as a Christian deist.

Fielding argues that Adams's beliefs synthesized Puritan, deist, and humanist concepts. Frazer notes that while he shared many perspectives with deists and often used deistic terminology, "Adams clearly was not a deist." In 1796, Adams denounced Thomas Paine's deistic criticisms of Christianity in The Age of Reason, noting that Christianity was "above all religions" and a "religion of wisdom, virtue, equity, and humanity". While both Jefferson and Adams denied the miracles of the Bible and the divinity of Christ, historian Gordon S. Wood notes that "Adams always retained a respect for the religiosity of people that Jefferson never had".

In his retirement years, Adams moved closer to more mainstream Enlightenment religious ideals. He blamed institutional Christianity and established churches in Britain and France for causing much suffering, but insisted that religion was necessary for society. In 1813, Adams suggested that the Christian Trinity was likely a "fabrication" derived from Pythagorean and Platonic philosophies rather than divine revelation. He further argued that one's salvation depended on behavior rather than belief. In an 1813 letter to Jefferson, Adams also mentioned reading Hindu texts and noting the "sublime" concept of an Eternal God that Pythagoras learned in India.

== Legacy ==
=== Historical reputation ===
Benjamin Franklin summarized what many thought of Adams, saying "He means well for his country, is always an honest man, often a wise one, but sometimes, and in some things, absolutely out of his senses." Adams strongly felt that he would be forgotten and underappreciated by history. These feelings often manifested themselves through envy and verbal attacks on other Founders. Edmund Morgan argues, "Adams was ridiculously vain, absurdly jealous, embarrassingly hungry for compliments. But no man ever served his country more selflessly."

Historian George C. Herring argued that Adams was the most independent minded of the Founders. Though he formally aligned with the Federalists, he at times disagreed with the Federalists as much as he did the Republicans. He was often described as prickly, but his tenacity was fed by decisions made in the face of universal opposition. Adams was often combative, as he admitted: "[As President] I refused to suffer in silence. I sighed, sobbed, and groaned, and sometimes screeched and screamed. And I must confess to my shame and sorrow that I sometimes swore." Stubbornness was seen as one of his defining traits: "Thanks to God that he gave me stubbornness when I know I am right," he wrote. His resolve to advance peace with France while maintaining a posture of defense reduced his popularity and contributed to his defeat for reelection. Most historians applaud him for avoiding an all-out war with France. His signing of the Alien and Sedition Acts is almost always condemned.

According to Ferling, Adams's political philosophy fell "out of step" with national trends. The country tended further away from Adams's emphasis on order and the rule of law and towards the Jeffersonian vision of liberty and weak central government. In the years following his retirement, as first Jeffersonianism and then Jacksonian democracy grew to dominate American politics, Adams was largely forgotten. In the 1840 presidential election, Whig candidate William Henry Harrison was attacked by Democrats on the false allegation that he had been a supporter of John Adams. Adams was eventually subject to criticism from states' rights advocates. Edward A. Pollard, a strong supporter of the Confederacy during the American Civil War, singled out Adams, writing:

The first President from the North, John Adams, asserted and essayed to put into practice the supremacy of the "National" power over the states and the citizens thereof. He was sustained in his attempted usurpations by all the New England states and by a powerful public sentiment in each of the Middle States. The "strict constructionists" of the Constitution were not slow in raising the standard of opposition against a pernicious error.

In 2001, McCullough argued that "The problem with Adams is that most Americans know nothing about him" while Todd Leopold of CNN wrote that Adams is "remembered as that guy who served a single term as president between Washington and Jefferson." He has always been seen, Ferling says, as "honest and dedicated", but despite his lengthy career in public service, is still overshadowed. Gilbert Chinard, in his 1933 biography of Adams, described him as "staunch, honest, stubborn and somewhat narrow." In his 1962 biography, Page Smith lauds Adams for his fight against radicals whose promised reforms portended anarchy and misery. Ferling, in his 1992 biography, writes that "Adams was his own worst enemy." He criticizes him for his "pettiness ... jealousy, and vanity", and faults his frequent separations from his family. He praises Adams for his willingness to acknowledge his deficiencies and for striving to overcome them.

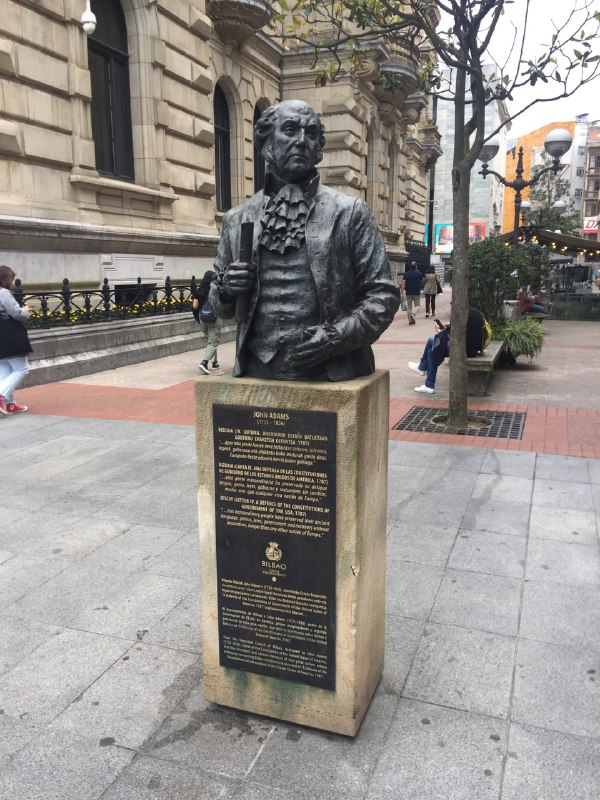
John Adams statue in Bilbao

In 2001, McCullough published the biography John Adams, in which he lauds Adams for consistency and honesty, "plays down or explains away" his more controversial actions, and criticizes Jefferson. The book sold very well and was very favorably received and, along with the Ferling biography, contributed to a rapid resurgence in Adams's reputation. In 2008, a miniseries was released based on the McCullough biography, featuring Paul Giamatti as Adams.

=== In memoriam ===
Adams is commemorated as the namesake of various counties, buildings, and other items. One example is the John Adams Building of the Library of Congress, an institution whose existence Adams had signed into law.

Adams is honored on the Memorial to the 56 Signers of the Declaration of Independence in Washington D.C. He does not have an individual monument dedicated to him in the city, although a family Adams Memorial was authorized in 2001. According to McCullough, "Popular symbolism has not been very generous toward Adams. There is no memorial, no statue ... in his honor in our nation's capital, and to me that is absolutely inexcusable. It's long past time when we should recognize what he did, and who he was."

== See also ==
- Electoral history of John Adams
- Founders Online
- List of abolitionist forerunners
- List of presidents of the United States

== Bibliography ==
=== Biographies ===
- Chinard, Gilbert (1933). Honest John Adams. Boston: Little, Brown, and Co. OCLC 988108386.
- Diggins, John P. (2003). Schlesinger, Arthur M. Jr. (ed.). John Adams. The American Presidents. New York: Time Books. ISBN 978-0805069372.
- Ellis, Joseph J. (1993). Passionate Sage: The Character and Legacy of John Adams. New York: W.W. Norton & Co. ISBN 978-0393311334.
- Ferling, John E. (1992). John Adams: A Life. Knoxville: University of Tennessee Press. ISBN 978-0870497308.
- McCullough, David (2001). John Adams. New York: Simon & Schuster. ISBN 978-1416575887.
- Morse, John Torey (1884). John Adams. Boston: Houghton, Mifflin, and Company. OCLC 926779205.
- Smith, Page (1962a). John Adams. Vol. I, 1735–1784. New York: Doubleday & Co. OCLC 852986601. (1969 edition ISBN 978-0837123486).
- Smith, Page (1962b). John Adams. Vol. II, 1784–1826. New York: Doubleday & Co. OCLC 852986620. (1969 edition ISBN 978-0837123486).

=== Specialized studies ===
- Boyd, Julian Parks; Gawalt, Gerard W. (1999). The Declaration of Independence: the evolution of the text. Library of Congress in association with the Thomas Jefferson Memorial Foundation. ISBN 978-0844409801.
- Brookhiser, Richard (2002). America's First Dynasty: The Adamses, 1735–1918. New York: Simon & Schuster. ISBN 978-0743242097.
- Burns, James MacGregor (2013). Fire and Light: How the Enlightenment Transformed Our World. New York: St. Martin's Press. ISBN 978-1250024909.
- Chernow, Ron (2004). Alexander Hamilton. London: Penguin Books. ISBN 978-1101200858.
- Elkins, Stanley M.; McKitrick, Eric (1993). The Age of Federalism. Oxford, NY: Oxford University Press. ISBN 978-0195068900.
- Ellis, Joseph J. (2003). Founding Brothers: The Revolutionary Generation. New York: Knopf Doubleday Publishing Group. ISBN 978-1400077687.
- Everett, Robert B. (1966). "The Mature Religious Thought of John Adams" (PDF). Proceedings of the South Carolina Historical Association. ISSN 0361-6207.
- Fea, John. "John Adams and religion." in A Companion to John Adams and John Quincy Adams (2013) pp. 184–198 online.
- Ferling, John (2009). The Ascent of George Washington: The Hidden Political Genius of an American Icon. New York: Bloomsbury Press. ISBN 978-1596914650.
- Fielding, Howard (1940). "John Adams: Puritan, Deist, Humanist". Journal of Religion. 20 (1): 33–46. doi:10.1086/482479. ISSN 0022-4189. JSTOR 1198647. S2CID 170183234.
- Flexner, James Thomas (1974). Washington: The Indispensable Man. Boston: Little, Brown. ISBN 978-0316286053.
- Georgini, Sara. Household Gods: The Religious Lives of the Adams Family (Oxford University Press, 2019) excerpt
- Gimbel, Richard (1956). A Bibliographical Check List of Common Sense, With an Account of Its Publication. New Haven, CT: Yale University Press.
- Herring, George C. (2008). From colony to superpower: U.S. foreign relations since 1776. Oxford, NY: Oxford University Press. ISBN 978-0199743773.
- Hoadley, John F. (1986). Origins of American Political Parties: 1789–1803. Lexington: University Press of Kentucky. ISBN 978-0813153209.
- Holdzkom, Marianne. Remembering John Adams: The Second President in History, Memory and Popular Culture (McFarland, 2023) online.
- Holmes, David L. The Faiths of the Founding Fathers (Oxford University Press, 2006) ch 7, "The Religious Views of John Adams," pp 73–108; also pp 117–121 on Abigail Adams.
- Holton, Woody (2010). Abigail Adams: A Life. New York: Atria. ISBN 978-1451607369.
- Hutson, James H. (March 1968). "John Adams' Title Campaign". The New England Quarterly. 41 (1): 30–39. doi:10.2307/363331. JSTOR 363331.
- Kirtley, James Samuel (1910). Half Hour Talks on Character Building: By Self-made Men and Women. A. Hamming. OCLC 13927429.
- Kurtz, Stephen G. (1957). The Presidency of John Adams: The Collapse of Federalism, 1795–1800. Philadelphia: University of Pennsylvania Press. OCLC 979781538. (2017 edition ISBN ISBN 978-0-8122-7101-0).
- Maier, Pauline (1998). American Scripture: Making the Declaration of Independence. New York: Vintage Books. ISBN 978-0679779087.
- Mayville, Luke (2016). John Adams and the Fear of American Oligarchy. Princeton: Princeton University Press. ISBN 978-1400883691.
- McDonald, Forrest (1974). The Presidency of George Washington. American Presidency. Lawrence: University Press of Kansas. ISBN 978-0700603596.
- Miller, Nathan (1997). The U.S. Navy: A History (3rd ed.). Annapolis, MD: Naval Institute Press. ISBN 978-1612518923.
- Moore, George (1866). Notes on the history of slavery in Massachusetts. New York: D. Appleton & Co. OCLC 419266287. (2012 Gale edition ISBN ISBN 978-1-275-71918-7).
- Perry, James R. (1986). "Supreme Court Appointments, 1789–1801: Criteria, Presidential Style, and the Press of Events". Journal of the Early Republic. 6 (4): 371–410. doi:10.2307/3122645. JSTOR 3122645.
- Pollard, Edward A. (1862). The First Year of the War. Richmond, VA: West & Johnson. OCLC 79953002.
- Rossiter, Clinton (1955). Conservatism in America. New York: Knopf. OCLC 440025153.
- Scherr, Arthur (2018). John Adams, Slavery, and Race: Ideas, Politics, and Diplomacy in an Age of Crisis. Santa Barbara, CA: Praeger.
- Shafer, Ronald G. (2016). Carnival Campaign: How the Rollicking 1840 Campaign of "Tippecanoe and Tyler Too" Changed Presidential Politics Forever. Chicago: Review Press. ISBN 978-1613735435.
- Thompson, C. Bradley (1998). John Adams and the Spirit of Liberty. Lawrence: University Press of Kansas. ISBN 978-0700609154.
- Wiencek, Henry (2004). An Imperfect God: George Washington, His Slaves, and the Creation of America. Waterville, ME: Thorndike Press. p. 215. ISBN 978-0786261291.
- Wood, Gordon S. (2006). Revolutionary Characters: What Made the Founders Different. London: Penguin Books. ISBN 978-1594200939.
- Wood, Gordon S. (2009). Empire of Liberty: A history of the Early Republic, 1789–1815. Oxford: Oxford University Press. ISBN 978-0199741090.
- Wood, Gordon S. (2017). Friends Divided: John Adams and Thomas Jefferson. New York: Penguin. ISBN 978-0735224735.

=== Primary sources ===
- Adams, John; Adams, Charles Francis (1851). The Works of John Adams, Second President of the United States: Autobiography, continued. Diary. Essays and controversial papers of the Revolution. Vol. 3. Little, Brown.
- Adams, John (1892). Biddle, Alexander (ed.). Old Family Letters. Philadelphia, PA: Press of J.B. Lippincott Co. p. 38.
- Adams, John (2001). Carey, George Wescott (ed.). The Political Writings of John Adams. Washington, D.C.: Gateway Editions.
- Adams, John (2004). Diggins, John Patrick (ed.). The Portable John Adams. London: Penguin Books. ISBN 978-0142437780.
- Adams, John (1954). Peek, George A. Jr. (ed.). The Political Writings of John Adams: Representative Selections. New York: Liberal Arts Press. OCLC 52727656. (2003 Hackett edition ISBN 978-0-87220-699-1)
- Adams, John; Rush, Benjamin (1966). Schutz, John A.; Adair, Douglass (eds.). Spur of Fame, The Dialogues of John Adams and Benjamin Rush, 1805–1813. Santa Marino, CA: Huntington Library. ISBN 978-0865972872.
- Adams, John; Tudor, William (1819). Novanglus, and Massachusettensis: Or, Political Essays, Published in the Years 1774 and 1775, on the Principal Points of Controversy, Between Great Britain and Her Colonies. Princeton, NJ: Hews & Gloss. OCLC 33610833.
- Adams, John (1965). Wroth, L. Kinvin; Zobel, Hiller B. (eds.). The Legal Papers of John Adams. Cambridge, MA: Harvard University Press. ISBN 978-0674522503.
- Butterfield, L.H., et al., eds., The Adams Papers (1961– ). Multivolume letterpress edition of all letters to and from major members of the Adams family, plus their diaries; still incomplete. "The Adams Family Papers Editorial Project". Masshist.org.
- Butterfield, L.H., ed. Adams Family Correspondence. Cambridge: Harvard University Press
- Cappon, Lester J., ed. (1959). The Adams–Jefferson Letters: The Complete Correspondence Between Thomas Jefferson and Abigail and John Adams. Chapel Hill: The University of North Carolina Press. (1988 edition ISBN 978-0-8078-4230-0)
- Foot, Michael; Kramnick, Isaac, eds. (1987). The Thomas Paine Reader. Penguin Classics. ISBN 978-0140444964.
- Hogan, Margaret; Taylor, C. James, eds. (2007). My Dearest Friend: Letters of Abigail and John Adams. Cambridge: Harvard University Press.
- Richardson, James Daniel, ed. (1897). A Compilation of the Messages and Papers of the Presidents. Vol. 1. Cambridge, MA: Harvard University. OCLC 3144460227.
- Taylor, Robert J. et al., eds. Papers of John Adams. Cambridge, MA: Harvard University Press.

Political offices
Office established	Delegate from Massachusetts to the Continental Congress; 1774–1777	Succeeded by Samuel Holten
Office established	Chairman of the Marine Committee; 1775–1779	Succeeded by Francis Lewis (Continental Board of Admiralty)
Office established	Vice President of the United States; 1789–1797	Succeeded by Thomas Jefferson
Preceded by George Washington	President of the United States; 1797–1801	Succeeded by Thomas Jefferson
Diplomatic posts
Preceded by Silas Deane	United States Envoy to France; 1777–1779	Succeeded by Benjamin Franklin
Office established	United States Minister to the Netherlands; 1782–1788	Succeeded by Charles W. F. Dumas (acting)
Office established	United States Minister to the United Kingdom; 1785–1788	Succeeded by Thomas Pinckney
Party political offices
New political party	Federalist nominee for President of the United States; 1796, 1800	Succeeded by Charles Cotesworth Pinckney
