= Thomas Rickman (disambiguation) =

Thomas Rickman (1776–1841) was an English architect.

Thomas Rickman may also refer to:

- Thomas Rickman (writer) (1940–2018), American screenwriter and film producer
- Thomas 'Clio' Rickman (1760–1834), English Quaker writer and bookseller
