= Jeanne Bernard =

Jeanne Bernard may refer to:

- Jeanne Bernard Dabos (1765–1842), French miniature painter
- Jeanne Adèle Bernard (1868–1962), French couturier known as Jenny Sacerdote
