= François-Xavier Lanthenas =

François Xavier Lanthenas, born on April 19, 1754 in Puy-en-Velay (province of Velay, current department of Haute-Loire), died in Paris on 13 Nivôse year VII (January 2, 1799), was a doctor and a politician during the French Revolution. He was a translator of Tom Paine's Rights of Man.

== Biography ==
=== Family origins and education ===
François Xavier Lanthenas came from a family of the well to do middle class. His father Joseph is a candle merchant. His mother was Marie Elisabeth Pons. Lanthenas studied at the college of Puy-en-Velay. During his apprenticeship in commerce, he was sent to the Kingdom of Naples, where he became friends with Jean-Marie François Merlino, a Lyon textiles merchant, and with Jean-Marie Roland de la Platière, who persuaded his father to allow him to study medicine. Lanthenas received his doctorate in medicine in September 1784 at the University of Reims. He practiced medicine in Villefranche-sur-Saône and stayed in Paris where he associated with Roland, the tax farmer Tronchin, and, from 1787, Jacques-Pierre Brissot, with whom he was a member of the Society of the Friends of the Blacks.

=== Activity in the early phase of the revolution ===
In early 1790 he helped Nicholas Bonneville Claude Fauchet and Condorcet establish The Society of the Friends of Truth. In late July Malouet targeted Marat and Desmoulins with a draft decree making guilty of a crime those who "in their writings incite the people to insurrection against the law, to bloodshed and the overthrow of the constitution". The Society of the Friends of Truth combined with the Cordeliers to form Amis de la liberté Indéfine de la presse (Friends of Unrestricted Press Freedom) and Lathenas described the participants as the "truest friends of Liberty". Lathenas argued that unlimited freedom of the press was the guardian and sole infallible safeguard of the general will. He was sanguine at the prospect that such freedom must apply to hardline royalists to saying let them "vomit their lies". His answer to that was a better educated people who would so learn to judge correctly.

He also frequented the Jacobin Club between 1791 and 1792.

=== Election to the National Convention ===
In September 1792, François-Xavier Lanthenas was elected deputy to the National Convention. He was appointed by the department of Haute-Loire, the fourth out of seven, and by that of Rhône-et-Loire, the fifteenth and last. He opted for the latter department and was replaced in Haute-Loire by Jean-André Barthélémy. Lanthenas sat on the benches of the Gironde. During the trial of Louis XVI, he voted for death and rejected the appeal to the people and the stay of execution. He voted against the indictment of Jean-Paul Marat, although he suggested that "doctors be appointed to examine whether Marat was not in fact suffering from madness and frenzy". He did not take part in the vote on the reestablishment of the Commission of Twelve. He was denounced by the sections of Paris as well as about twenty other deputies from the Gironde for having "openly violated the faith of his constituents", such as Brissot, Guadet and Vergniaud. He was, however, released from the arrest decree on June 2 following an intervention by Marat, who judged that "Doctor Lanthenas is a poor man in spirit who does not deserve to be taken care of". Already in his newspaper Le Publiciste de la République française, Marat had dismissed the accusation of the insurrectional Commune against him by writing that Lanthenas was "too imbecile to be counted among the leaders". According to the historian Michel Pertué, it was perhaps out of consideration for his colleague, who was also a doctor, that Marat intervened so that he would not be disturbed. In October 1792, Lanthenas was elected substitute to the Constitutional Committee and a member of the Public Instruction Committee, from which he left in October 1793 11. In 1793, during Robespierre's dominance, he had to bend to the political winds and he reversed his former free speech fundamentalism saying society would be perpetually unhappy if it did not establish effective means for protecting citizens "from libels and calumny". In Brumaire Year III (October 1794), he was elected member of the Commission of Twenty-One charged with examining the conduct of Jean-Baptiste Carrier, accused of being responsible for the shootings and drownings during his mission in Nantes

=== Election to the Council of Five Hundred and death ===
François-Xavier Lanthenas was elected deputy of Ille-et-Vilaine to the Council of Five Hundred on 24 Vendémiaire Year IV (16 October 1795). He left in Germinal Year V (late March-early April 1795). He was appointed commissioner of the Executive Directory to the municipal administration of the 11th arrondissement of Paris. He died in poverty, despite having inherited an estate from his mother and 25,000 livres from his father.

== Works ==
Translator of Thomas Paine : Common Sense, Theory and Practice of the Rights of Man, The Age of Reason, etc.,
he published many books, some of which were printed by order of the Convention:

- Fundamental bases of public education and of any free constitution (Bases fondamentales de l'instruction publique et de toute constitution libre), Paris, 1793
- On elections and the method of electing by purifying lists(Des élections et du mode d'élire par listes épuratoires), Paris, 1792
- National Convention Education, the remote cause and often even the immediate cause of all illnesses, proposition supported on September 13, 1784, in the medical schools of Reims (Convention nationale L'éducation, cause éloignée et souvent même cause prochaine de toutes les maladies, proposition soutenue, le 13 septembre 1784, dans les écoles de médecine de Reims), Paris, 1793
- Organic division of citizens into tens, hundreds and thousands, with the means to make the best possible elections (Division organique des citoyens en dizaines, centaines et mille, avec les moyens de faire les meilleures élections possibles), Paris, year III
- Right of citizenship, exercise of the sovereignty of the French people and guarantee of public freedom against the abuses of equality in law (Droit de cité, exercice de la souveraineté du peuple français et garantie de la liberté publique contre les abus de l'égalité en droit), Paris, year III
- Inconveniences of the right of primogeniture, work in which it is demonstrated that any distinction between the children of the same family leads to a host of evils... and decision of MM. the doctors of the house and royal society of Navarre on primogeniture, Paris
