= Headstrong Club =

18th-century debating society

The Headstrong Club was an 18th-century debating society operating out of an upstairs room at The White Hart in Lewes, East Sussex, England. Notable members included Thomas Paine and Thomas 'Clio' Rickman.

== Legacy ==
A modern iteration of the club, with the same and purpose, was launched in 1987, on 30 January, the 250th anniversary of the birth of Thomas Paine.

Sir Richard Jolly created The Headstrong Society at the United Nations Development Programme (UNDP) in New York City in 1998. The purpose of the group was to bring experts from United Nations agencies together to discuss current events.
