= Marguerite Brazier =

Marguerite Brazier Bonneville (1767 – 1846) was a Parisian woman, the wife of author Nicholas Bonneville, mother of explorer Benjamin Bonneville, and companion of Thomas Paine.

== Life in France ==
Both Marguerite and Nicholas de Bonneville were active figures in the French Revolution, and Marguerite was influenced by the radical Dutch feminist Etta Palm d'Aelders. (See here for an explanation of the "d' ".) Beginning in 1797, the couple hosted the revolutionary and author Thomas Paine in their home. In 1802, after her husband was arrested for comparing Napoleon with Oliver Cromwell, Marguerite Bonneville accompanied Paine to America, bringing her three children: Louis, Benjamin, who would become an important American explorer and military figure, and Thomas, Paine's godson.

== With Paine in America ==
The two lived in New Rochelle, New York, where Marguerite cared for Paine in his ill health, sometimes living with him, and where he helped provide for her, and for her sons' educations. Paine died in 1809. He bequeathed her $1,500, leaving a quarter of his estate to her husband Nicholas, and half to the Bonneville boys. Bonneville arranged for the publication the following year of Paine's book On the Origin of Free-Masonry.

After Paine's death, publicist James Cheetham wrote that Bonneville's son Thomas resembled Paine, and insinuated an illicit relationship between Paine and Bonneville, "a woman, I cannot say a Lady." Bonneville sued Cheetham for libel, and won her suit when at the trial, Cheetham's principal witness stated that he had "never seen the slightest indication of any meretricious or illicit commerce between Paine and Mrs. Bonneville." While Bonneville won her suit, the judge awarded her only $150, praising Cheetham's book as written in "the cause of religion." During the trial a number of prominent figures testified to Bonneville's character, including the politician Thomas Addis Emmet.

On March 13 1813, Bonneville wrote to former president Thomas Jefferson, requesting permission to publish his correspondence with Paine. Bonneville wrote, “[W]hile he lived, I thought it a duty, as well as a test of my own political principles to support him against the persecutions of an unprincipled faction.” Jefferson, however, declined her request.

== Later life ==
Moncure Daniel Conway, the American abolitionist minister and biographer, wrote that after Paine's death, Bonneville published a fragment of the third volume of his "Age of Reason" with potentially irreligious passages erased. Conway furthermore wrote, on the basis of an 1829 French biographical dictionary, that Bonneville had received all of Paine's papers and began editing his autobiography, which was never published.

According to Conway, in 1833 Bonneville returned to America where she lived with her son, the American explorer and military figure Benjamin Bonneville. Conway suggests that the mother and son, both Catholic, may have suppressed Paine's writings and destroyed them out of religious sentiment, and to avoid the embarrassment of the earlier libel lawsuit.

Bonneville died in 1846 at her son Benjamin's house in St. Louis.

== See also ==
- Etta Palm d'Aelders
- Louise-Félicité de Kéralio
