= Antoine Joseph Barruel-Beauvert =

Antoine Joseph Barruel-Beauvert (1756–1817) was a French military officer and journalist. He was born Comte de Barruel-Beauvert, at the castle of Beauvert, in Languedoc, but was impoverished by the Revolution. He took part in some events of the French Revolution. He was also the first biographer of Jean-Jacques Rousseau.

== Military career ==
Having adopted the military profession, beginning in 1776, he commanded a company in the regiment of Belsunce. He later served in the militia of Brittany, and in 1790 joined the pro-Royalist national guard at Bagnols.

== Revolutionary events ==
After the flight of the royal family to Varennes, he offered himself as a hostage for Louis XVI. He received the cross of St Louis as a reward for his conduct on 20 June 1792, when the hall of the Assembly and the royal apartments in the Tuileries were invaded.

In 1789, Barruel-Beauvert published the first biography of Jean-Jacques Rousseau, of whom he was a great admirer.

In 1795 he was editor of the journal entitled "Les Actes des Apotres", a Royalist publication, and because of that, after the coup of 18 Fructidor (4 September 1797), he was ordered to be deported, but made his escape. For a while, he was hiding in the house of Nicholas Bonneville, where Thomas Paine also lived. Barruel-Beauvert managed to remain in Paris undiscovered by the police till 1800, when he was imprisoned, but obtained his liberty in 1802. Empress Josephine seems to have lobbied for his release from prison. He also managed to receive a small government job.

== Later years ==
After the Bourbon Restoration, Barruel-Beauvert's disappointment at not receiving the rewards and honours, which he thought to be his due, led him to publish several somewhat controversial pamphlets. Because of this, he was obliged to leave Paris, and went to Italy. He died in Turin, Italy, in 1817.

== Bibliography ==
- "Vie de J. J. Rousseau," 1789
- "Caricatures Politiques", Histoire de la pretendue Princesse de Bourbon Conti", Besançon, 1811
- "Lettres sur quelques Particularites de l'Hist. pendant l'lnterregne des Bourbons," 1815, 3 vols
