= Thomas Paine =

English-born philosopher and author (1737–1809)

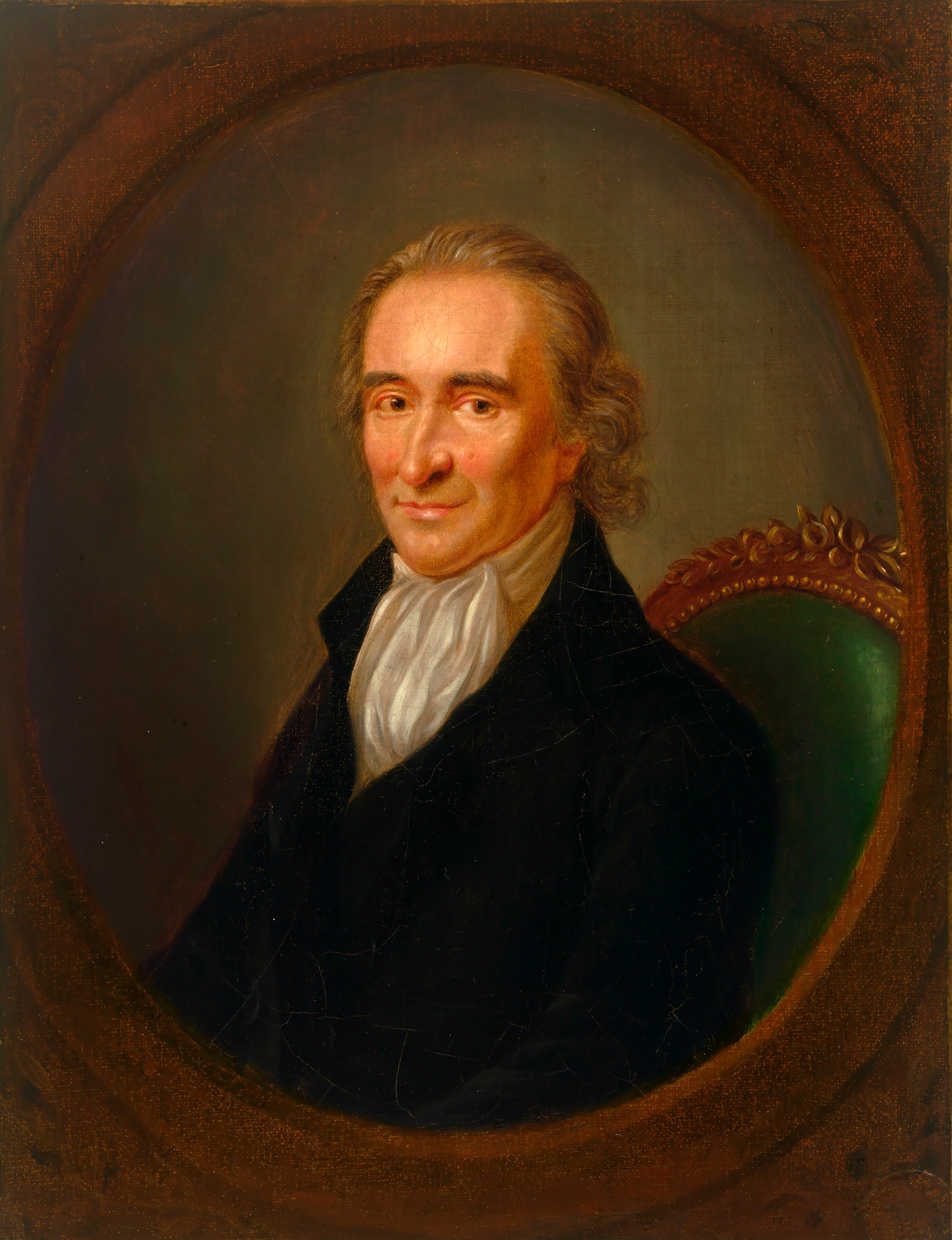
- Portrait by Laurent Dabos, c. 1792

Deputy of the National Convention
- In office September 20, 1792 – December 28, 1793
- Preceded by: Constituency established
- Succeeded by: Constituency abolished
- Constituency: Pas-de-Calais

28th Chief Clerk of the Pennsylvania General Assembly
- In office November 2, 1779 – November 3, 1780
- Preceded by: John Morris Jr.
- Succeeded by: Samuel Sterett

Secretary of the Congressional Committee on Foreign Affairs
- In office April 17, 1777 – January 8, 1779
- Preceded by: William Bingham
- Succeeded by: James Lovell

Personal details
- Born: Thomas Pain; February 9, 1737 (N.S.) Thetford, Norfolk, Great Britain
- Died: June 8, 1809 (aged 72) Greenwich Village, New York City, U.S.
- Spouses: Mary Lambert (m. 1759; died 1760); Elizabeth Ollive (m. 1771; sep. 1774)

Philosophical work
- Era: Age of Enlightenment
- School: Liberalism; (Radicalism); Republicanism; Secular humanism
- Main interests: Politics; ethics; religion

Thomas Paine (born Thomas Pain, February 9, 1737 [O.S. January 29, 1736] (Note: Conway, Moncure D. (1908). The Life of Thomas Paine. Vol. 1. Cobbett, William, Illustrator. G. P. Putnam's Sons. p. 3. Archived from the original on June 12, 2020. – In the contemporary record as noted by Conway, Paine's birth date is given as January 29, 1736–37. Common practice was to use a dash or a slash to separate the old-style year from the new-style year. In the old calendar, the new year began on March 25, not January 1. Paine's birth date, therefore, would have been before New Year, 1737. In the new style, his birth date advances by eleven days and his year increases by one to February 9, 1737. The O.S. link gives more detail if needed.) – June 8, 1809; /ˈtɒməs ˈpeɪn/) was an English-born American Founding Father, inventor, political philosopher, and statesman. He authored Common Sense (1776) and The American Crisis (1776–1783), two of the most influential pamphlets at the start of the American Revolution, and he helped to inspire the colonial era patriots in 1776 to declare independence from Great Britain. His ideas reflected Enlightenment-era ideals of human rights.

Paine was born in Thetford, Norfolk, and immigrated to the British American colonies in 1774 with the help of Benjamin Franklin, arriving in time to participate in the American Revolution. Virtually every American Patriot read his 47-page pamphlet Common Sense, which catalyzed the call for independence from Great Britain. He then wrote The American Crisis, a pro-independence pamphlet series. He returned to Great Britain in 1787, where he wrote Rights of Man (1791), in part a defense of the French Revolution against its critics, particularly the Anglo-Irish conservative writer Edmund Burke. His authorship of the tract led to a trial and conviction in absentia in England in 1792 for the crime of seditious libel. Paine was also a staunch critic of fiat currency, arguing in his 1786 essay Dissertations on Government that paper money was a form of state counterfeiting that undermined republican principles and public morality.

The British government of William Pitt the Younger was worried by the possibility that the French Revolution might spread to Great Britain and had begun suppressing works that espoused radical philosophies. Paine's work advocated the right of the people to overthrow their government and was therefore targeted with a writ for his arrest issued in early 1792. In September, Paine fled to France, where he was quickly elected to the French National Convention, despite not being able to speak French. The Girondins regarded him as an ally; consequently, the Montagnards regarded him as an enemy, especially Marc-Guillaume Alexis Vadier, the powerful president of the Committee of General Security. In December 1793, Vadier arrested Paine and took him to Luxembourg Prison in Paris. He completed the first part of The Age of Reason just before he was arrested. Mark Philp notes that "In prison Paine managed to produce (and to convey to Daniel Isaac Eaton, the radical London publisher) a dedication for The Age of Reason and a new edition of the Rights of Man with a new preface." James Monroe used his diplomatic connections to get Paine released in November 1794.

Paine became notorious because of his pamphlets and attacks on his former allies, who he felt had betrayed him. In The Age of Reason and other writings, he advocated Deism, promoted reason and freethought, and argued against religion in general and Christian doctrine in particular. In 1796, he published a bitter open letter to George Washington, whom he denounced as an incompetent general and a hypocrite. He published the pamphlet Agrarian Justice (1797), discussing the origins of property and introducing the concept of a guaranteed minimum income through a one-time inheritance tax on landowners. Having returned to the U.S. in 1802, Paine was broadly ostracized for his ridicule of Christianity and his attacks on the nation's leaders. Following his death on June 8, 1809, only six mourners attended Paine's funeral.

== Biography ==
Paine was born on January 29, 1736 (NS February 9, 1737), the son of Joseph Pain (1708–1787), a tenant farmer and stay-maker, and Frances (née Cocke) Pain, in Thetford, Norfolk, England. Joseph was a Quaker and Frances an Anglican. Despite claims that Paine changed the spelling of his family name upon his emigration to America in 1774, he was using "Paine" in 1769, while still in Lewes, Sussex.

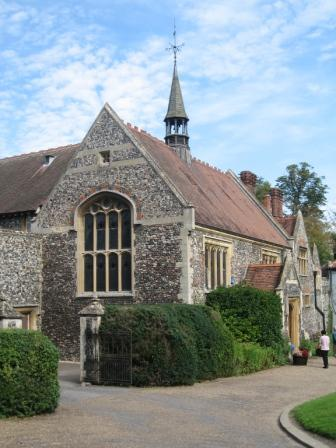
Old School at Thetford Grammar School, where Paine was educated

He attended Thetford Grammar School (1744–1749), at a time when there was no compulsory education. At the age of 13, he was apprenticed to his father. Following his apprenticeship, aged 19, Paine enlisted and served as a privateer, aboard the ship King of Prussia. Upon returning to Britain in 1759, he became a master staymaker, establishing a shop in Sandwich, Kent.

On September 27, 1759, Paine married Mary Lambert. His business collapsed soon after. Mary became pregnant; and, after they moved to Margate, she went into early labour, in which she and their child died.

In July 1761, Paine returned to Thetford to work as a supernumerary officer. In December 1762, he became an Excise Officer in Grantham, Lincolnshire; in August 1764, he was transferred to Alford, also in Lincolnshire, at a salary of £50 per annum. On August 27, 1765, he was dismissed as an Excise Officer for "claiming to have inspected goods he did not inspect". On July 31, 1766, he requested his reinstatement from the Board of Excise, which they granted the next day, upon vacancy. While awaiting that, he worked as a staymaker.

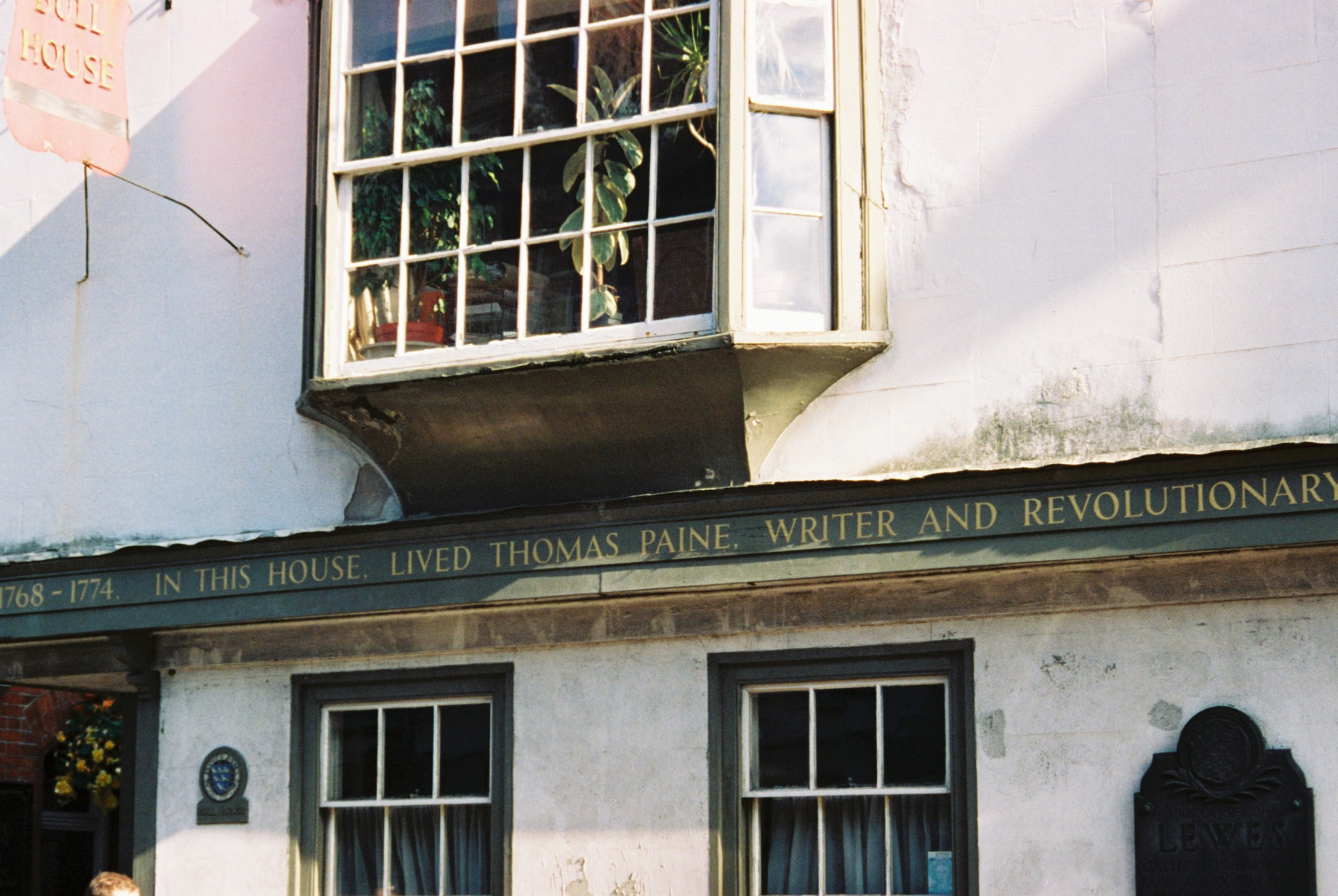
Thomas Paine's house in Lewes

In 1767, he was appointed to a position in Grampound, Cornwall. Later he asked to leave this post to await a vacancy, and he became a school teacher in London.

On February 19, 1768, he was appointed to Lewes in Sussex, a town with a tradition of opposition to the monarchy and pro-republican sentiments since the revolutionary decades of the 17th century. Here he lived above the 15th-century Bull House, the tobacco shop of Samuel Ollive and Esther Ollive.

Paine first became involved in civic matters when he was based in Lewes. He appears in the Town Book as a member of the Court Leet, the governing body for the town. He was also a member of the parish vestry, an influential local Anglican church group whose responsibilities for parish business would include collecting taxes and tithes to distribute among the poor. On March 26, 1771, at age 34, Paine married Elizabeth Ollive, the daughter of his recently deceased landlord, whose business as a grocer and tobacconist he then entered into.

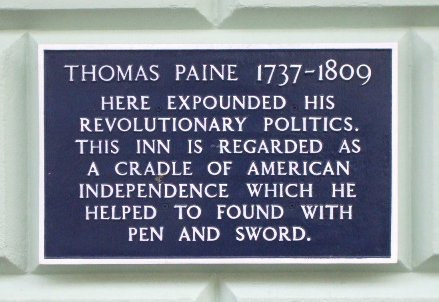
Plaque at the White Hart Hotel, Lewes, East Sussex, south east England

In Danielle Allen's 2026 biography of Charles Lennox, 3rd Duke of Richmond, she identifies "the radical Duke" as Thomas Paine's first political patron. The two likely first met in London at the Society for the Encouragement of Arts, Manufacturers, and Commerce. Paine's appointment as a tax collector in Lewes was in the Sussex jurisdiction of the Duke; the office gave Paine a stable income. Allen contends that the Duke created a consortium of radical thinkers and gifted writers who published anti-government criticism pseudonymously as "Junius" and that Paine was one of the major contributors to the Letters of Junius. Allen also identifies Paine as the author of a 95-page essay in pamphlet form entitled The Journeyman's Touch-stone published under the pen name "Censor-General" in 1771. It offered a defense of the rights of jurors in support of the publisher Henry Woodfall who faced criminal prosecution by the Crown for printing and distributing the Letters of Junius.

From 1772 to 1773, Paine joined excise officers asking Parliament for better pay and working conditions, publishing, in summer of 1772, The Case of the Officers of Excise, a 12-page article, and his first political work, spending the London winter distributing the 4,000 copies printed to the Parliament and others. In spring 1774, he was again dismissed from the excise service for being absent from his post without permission. The tobacco shop failed. On April 14, to avoid debtors' prison, he sold his household possessions to pay debts. He formally separated from his wife Elizabeth on June 4, 1774, and moved to London. In September, mathematician, Fellow of the Royal Society, and Commissioner of the Excise George Lewis Scott introduced him to Benjamin Franklin, who was there as a voice for colonial opposition to British colonial rule, especially as it related to the Stamp Act, and the Townshend Acts. He was publisher and editor of the largest American newspaper, The Pennsylvania Gazette and suggested emigration to Philadelphia. He gave a letter of recommendation to Paine, who emigrated in October to the American colonies, arriving in Philadelphia on November 30, 1774.

=== In Pennsylvania Magazine ===
Paine barely survived the transatlantic voyage. The ship's water supplies were bad and typhoid fever killed five passengers. On arriving at Philadelphia, he was too sick to disembark. Benjamin Franklin's physician, there to welcome Paine to America, had him carried off ship; Paine took six weeks to recover. He became a citizen of Pennsylvania "by taking the oath of allegiance at a very early period". In March 1775, he became editor of the Pennsylvania Magazine, a position he conducted with considerable ability.

Before Paine's arrival in America, sixteen magazines had been founded in the colonies and ultimately failed, each featuring substantial content and reprints from England. In late 1774, Philadelphia printer Robert Aitken announced his plan to create what he called an "American Magazine" with content derived from the colonies. Paine contributed two pieces to the magazine's inaugural issue dated January 1775, and Aitken hired Paine as the Magazine's editor one month later. Under Paine's leadership, the magazine's readership rapidly expanded, achieving a greater circulation in the colonies than any American magazine up until that point. While Aitken had conceived of the magazine as nonpolitical, Paine brought a strong political perspective to its content, writing in its first issue that "every heart and hand seem to be engaged in the interesting struggle for American Liberty."

Paine wrote in the Pennsylvania Magazine that such a publication should become a "nursery of genius" for a nation that had "now outgrown the state of infancy", exercising and educating American minds, and shaping American morality. On March 8, 1775, the Pennsylvania Magazine published an unsigned abolitionist essay titled African Slavery in America. The essay is often attributed to Paine on the basis of a letter by Benjamin Rush, recalling Paine's claim of authorship to the essay. The essay attacked slavery as an "execrable commerce" and "outrage against Humanity and Justice."

Consciously appealing to a broader and more working-class audience, Paine also used the magazine to discuss worker rights to production. This shift in the conceptualization of politics has been described as a part of "the 'modernization' of political consciousness", and the mobilization of ever greater sections of society into political life.

=== American Revolution ===
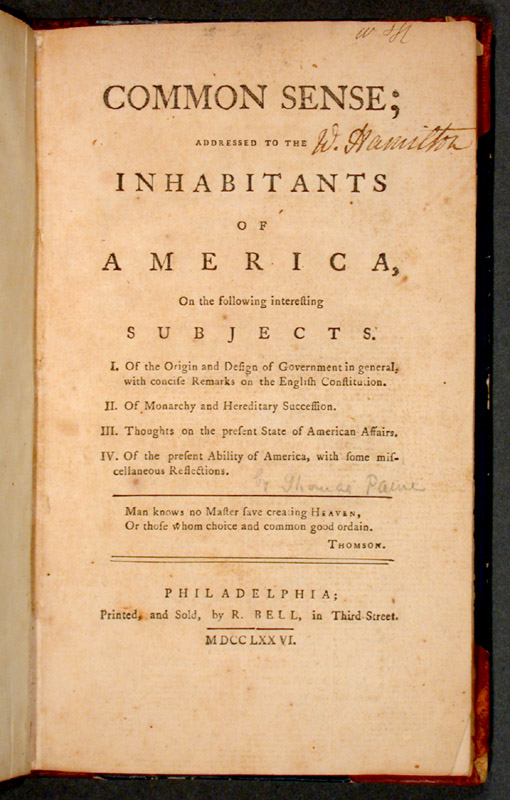
Common Sense, published in 1776

==== Common Sense (1776) ====
Paine has a claim to the title The Father of the American Revolution, which rests on his pamphlets, especially Common Sense, which crystallized sentiment for independence in 1776. It was published in Philadelphia on January 10, 1776, and signed anonymously "by an Englishman". It was an immediate success, with Paine estimating it sold 100,000 copies in three months to the two million residents of the 13 colonies. During the course of the American Revolution, one biographer estimated a total of about 500,000 copies were sold, including unauthorized editions. However, some historians dispute these numbers. Paine's original title for the pamphlet was Plain Truth, but Paine's friend, pro-independence advocate Benjamin Rush, suggested Common Sense instead. Finding a printer who was daring enough to commit his print shop to the printing of Common Sense was not easy. At the advice of Rush, Paine commissioned Robert Bell to print his work.

The pamphlet came into circulation in January 1776, after the Revolution had started. It was passed around and often read aloud in taverns, contributing significantly to spreading the idea of republicanism, bolstering enthusiasm for separation from Britain, and encouraging recruitment for the Continental Army. Paine provided a new and convincing argument for independence by advocating a complete break with history. Common Sense is oriented to the future in a way that compels the reader to make an immediate choice. It offers a solution for Americans disgusted with and alarmed at the threat of tyranny.

Paine's attack on monarchy in Common Sense was essentially an attack on King George III. Whereas colonial resentments were originally directed primarily against the king's ministers and Parliament, Paine laid the responsibility firmly at the king's door. Common Sense was the most widely read pamphlet of the American Revolution. It was a clarion call for unity against the corrupt British court, so as to realize America's providential role in providing an asylum for liberty. Written in a direct and lively style, it denounced the decaying despotisms of Europe and pilloried hereditary monarchy as an absurdity. At a time when many still hoped for reconciliation with Britain, Common Sense demonstrated to many the inevitability of separation.

Paine was not on the whole expressing original ideas in Common Sense, but rather employing rhetoric as a means to arouse resentment of the Crown. To achieve these ends, he pioneered a style of political writing suited to the democratic society he envisioned, with Common Sense serving as a primary example. Part of Paine's work was to render complex ideas intelligible to average readers of the day, with clear, concise writing unlike the formal, learned style favored by many of Paine's contemporaries. Scholars have put forward various explanations to account for its success, including the historic moment, Paine's easy-to-understand style, his democratic ethos, and his use of psychology and ideology.

Common Sense was immensely popular in disseminating to a very wide audience ideas that were already in common use among the elite who comprised Congress and the leadership cadre of the emerging nation, who rarely cited Paine's arguments in their public calls for independence. The pamphlet probably had little direct influence on the Continental Congress' decision to issue a Declaration of Independence, since that body was more concerned with how declaring independence would affect the war effort. One distinctive idea in Common Sense is Paine's beliefs regarding the peaceful nature of republics; his views were an early and strong conception of what scholars would come to call the democratic peace theory.

Loyalists vigorously attacked Common Sense; one attack, titled Plain Truth (1776), by Marylander James Chalmers, said Paine was a political quack and warned that without monarchy, the government would "degenerate into democracy". Even some American revolutionaries objected to Common Sense; late in life John Adams called it a "crapulous mass". Adams disagreed with the type of radical democracy promoted by Paine (that men who did not own property should still be allowed to vote and hold public office) and published Thoughts on Government in 1776 to advocate a more conservative approach to republicanism.

Sophia Rosenfeld argues that Paine was highly innovative in his use of the commonplace notion of "common sense". He synthesized various philosophical and political uses of the term in a way that permanently impacted American political thought. He used two ideas from Scottish Common Sense Realism: that ordinary people can indeed make sound judgments on major political issues, and that there exists a body of popular wisdom that is readily apparent to anyone. Paine also used a notion of "common sense" favored by philosophes in the Continental Enlightenment. They held that common sense could refute the claims of traditional institutions. Thus, Paine used "common sense" as a weapon to de-legitimize the monarchy and overturn prevailing conventional wisdom. Rosenfeld concludes that the phenomenal appeal of his pamphlet resulted from his synthesis of popular and elite elements in the independence movement.

According to historian Robert Middlekauff, Common Sense became immensely popular mainly because Paine appealed to widespread convictions. Monarchy, he said, was preposterous and it had a heathenish origin. It was an institution of the devil. Paine pointed to the Old Testament, where almost all kings had seduced the Israelites to worship idols instead of God. Paine also denounced aristocracy, which together with monarchy were "two ancient tyrannies". They violated the laws of nature, human reason, and the "universal order of things", which began with God. This was, Middlekauff says, exactly what most Americans wanted to hear. He calls the Revolutionary generation "the children of the twice-born" because in their childhood they had experienced the Great Awakening, which, for the first time, had tied Americans together, transcending denominational and ethnic boundaries and giving them a sense of patriotism.

==== Possible involvement in drafting the Declaration of Independence ====
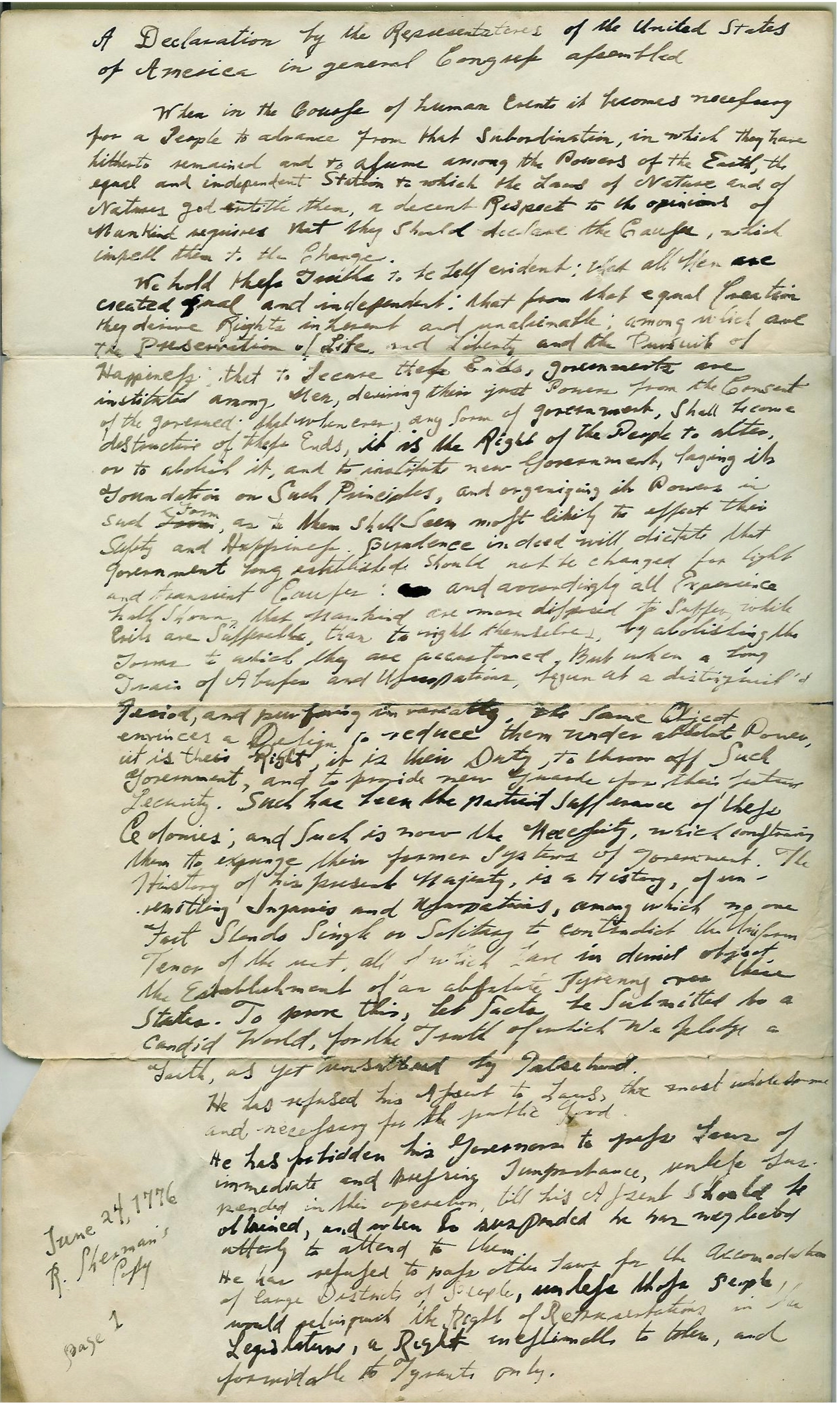
The Committee of Five working draft of the Declaration of Independence, dated June 24, 1776, copied from the original draft by John Adams for Roger Sherman's review and approval

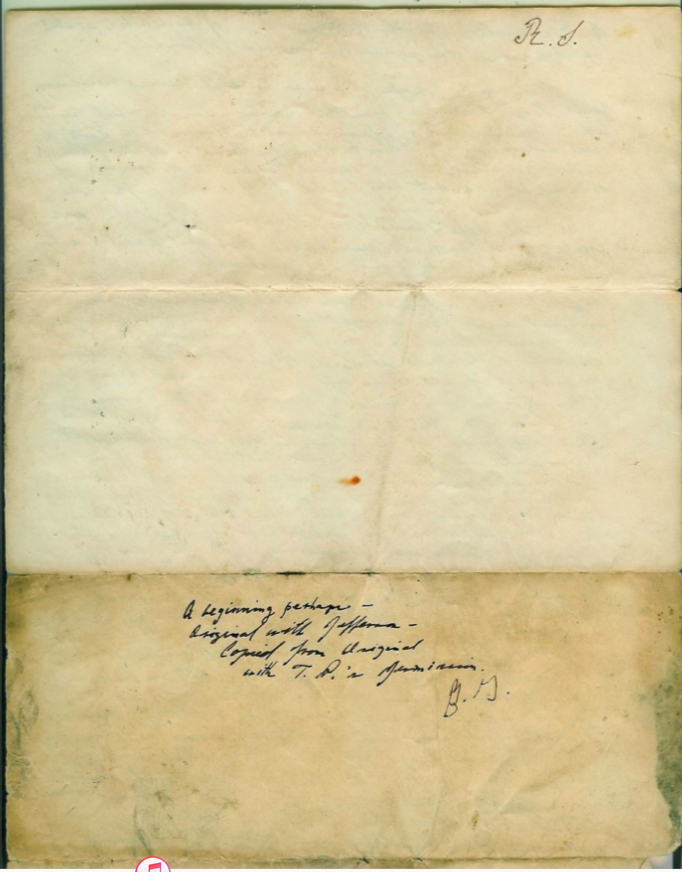
Inscription on reverse of Sherman Copy of the Declaration of Independence referencing "T.P." during the drafting process

While there is no historical record of Paine's involvement in drafting the Declaration of Independence, some scholars of Early American History have suspected his involvement. As noted by the Thomas Paine National Historical Association, multiple authors have hypothesized and written on the subject, including Moody (1872), Van der Weyde (1911), Lewis (1947), and more recently, Smith & Rickards (2007).

In 2018, the Thomas Paine National Historical Association introduced an early draft of the Declaration that contained evidence of Paine's involvement based on an inscription of "T.P." on the back of the document. During the early deliberations of the Committee of Five members chosen by Congress to draft the Declaration of Independence, John Adams made a hastily written manuscript copy of the original draft of the Declaration of Independence on June 24, 1776, known as the Sherman Copy. Adams made this copy shortly before preparing another neater, fair copy that is held in the Adams Family Papers collection at the Massachusetts Historical Society. The Sherman copy of the Declaration of Independence is one of several working drafts of the Declaration, made for Roger Sherman's review and approval before the Committee of Five submitted a finalized draft to Congress. The Sherman Copy of the Declaration of Independence contains an inscription on the back of the document that states: "A beginning perhaps – Original with Jefferson – Copied from Original with T.P.'s permission." According to the Thomas Paine National Historical Association, the individual referenced as "T.P." in the inscription appears to be Thomas Paine.

The degree to which Paine was involved in formulating the text of the Declaration is unclear, as the original draft referenced in the Sherman Copy inscription is presumed lost or destroyed. However, John Adams' request for permission of "T.P." to copy the original draft may suggest that Paine had a role either assisting Jefferson with organizing ideas within the Declaration, or contributing to the text of the original draft itself.

==== The American Crisis (1776) ====
In late 1776, Paine published The American Crisis pamphlet series to inspire the Americans in their battles against the British army. He juxtaposed the conflict between the good American devoted to civic virtue and the selfish provincial man. To inspire his soldiers, General George Washington had The American Crisis, first Crisis pamphlet, read aloud to them. It begins:

These are the times that try men's souls: The summer soldier and the sunshine patriot will, in this crisis, shrink from the service of their country; but he that stands it now, deserves the love and thanks of man and woman. Tyranny, like Hell, is not easily conquered; yet we have this consolation with us, that the harder the conflict, the more glorious the triumph. What we obtain too cheap, we esteem too lightly: it is dearness only that gives every thing its value. Heaven knows how to put a proper price upon its goods; and it would be strange indeed if so celestial an article as freedom should not be highly rated.

==== Foreign affairs ====
In 1777, Paine became secretary of the Congressional Committee on Foreign Affairs. The following year, he alluded to secret negotiation underway with France in his pamphlets. His enemies denounced his indiscretions. There was scandal; together with Paine's conflict with Robert Morris and Silas Deane, it led to Paine's expulsion from the Committee in 1779.

However, in 1781, he accompanied John Laurens on his mission to France. Eventually, after much pleading from Paine, New York State recognized his political services by presenting him with an estate at New Rochelle, New York and Paine received money from Pennsylvania and from Congress at Washington's suggestion. During the Revolutionary War, Paine served as an aide-de-camp to the important general, Nathanael Greene.

===== Silas Deane Affair =====
In what may have been an error, and perhaps even contributed to his resignation as the secretary to the Committee of Foreign Affairs, Paine was openly critical of Silas Deane, an American diplomat who had been appointed in March 1776 by the Congress to travel to France in secret. Deane's goal was to influence the French government to finance the colonists in their fight for independence. Paine largely saw Deane as a war profiteer who had little respect for principle, having been under the employ of Robert Morris, one of the primary financiers of the American Revolution and working with Pierre Beaumarchais, a French royal agent sent to the colonies by King Louis XVI to investigate the Anglo-American conflict. Paine uncovered the financial connection between Morris, who was Superintendent for Finance of the Continental Congress, and Deane.

Wealthy men, such as Robert Morris, John Jay and powerful merchant bankers, were leaders of the Continental Congress and defended holding public positions while at the same time profiting off their own personal financial dealings with governments. Amongst Paine's criticisms, he had written in the Pennsylvania Packet that France had "prefaced [their] alliance by an early and generous friendship", referring to aid that had been provided to American colonies prior to the recognition of the Franco-American treaties. This was alleged to be effectively an embarrassment to France, which potentially could have jeopardized the alliance. John Jay, the President of the Congress, who had been a fervent supporter of Deane, immediately spoke out against Paine's comments. The controversy eventually became public, and Paine was then denounced as unpatriotic for criticizing an American revolutionary. He was even physically assaulted twice in the street by Deane supporters. This much-added stress took a large toll on Paine, who was generally of a sensitive character and he resigned as secretary to the Committee of Foreign Affairs in 1779. Paine left the Committee without even having enough money to buy food for himself.

Much later, when Paine returned from his mission to France, Deane's corruption had become more widely acknowledged. Many, including Robert Morris, apologized to Paine, and Paine's reputation in Philadelphia was restored.

==== "Public Good" ====
In 1780, Paine published a pamphlet entitled "Public Good", in which he made the case that territories west of the 13 colonies that had been part of the British Empire belonged after the Declaration of Independence to the American government, and did not belong to any of the 13 states or to any individual speculators. A royal charter of 1609 had granted to the Virginia Company land stretching to the Pacific Ocean. A small group of wealthy Virginia land speculators, including the Washington, Lee, and Randolph families, had taken advantage of this royal charter to survey and to claim title to huge swaths of land, including much land west of the 13 colonies. In "Public Good", Paine argued that these lands belonged to the American government as represented by the Continental Congress. This angered many of Paine's wealthy Virginia friends, including Richard Henry Lee of the powerful Lee family, who had been Paine's closest ally in Congress, George Washington, Thomas Jefferson and James Madison, all of whom had claims to huge wild tracts that Paine was advocating should be government owned. The view that Paine had advocated eventually prevailed when the Northwest Ordinance of 1787 was passed.

The animosity Paine felt as a result of the publication of "Public Good" fueled his decision to embark with Lieutenant Colonel John Laurens on a mission to travel to Paris to obtain funding for the American war effort.

==== Funding the Revolution ====
Paine accompanied Col. John Laurens to France and is credited with initiating the mission. It landed in France in March 1781 and returned to America in August with 2.5 million livres in silver, as part of a "present" of 6 million and a loan of 10 million. The meetings with the French king were most likely conducted in the company and under the influence of Benjamin Franklin. Upon returning to the United States with this highly welcomed cargo, Paine and probably Col. Laurens, "positively objected" that General Washington should propose that Congress remunerate him for his services, for fear of setting "a bad precedent and an improper mode". Paine made influential acquaintances in Paris and helped organize the Bank of North America to raise money to supply the army. In 1785, he was given $3,000 by the U.S. Congress in recognition of his service to the nation.

Henry Laurens (father of Col. John Laurens) had been the ambassador to the Netherlands, but he was captured by the British on his return trip there. When he was later exchanged for the prisoner Lord Cornwallis in late 1781, Paine proceeded to the Netherlands to continue the loan negotiations. There remains some question as to the relationship of Henry Laurens and Paine to Robert Morris as the Superintendent of Finance and his business associate, Thomas Willing, who became the first president of the Bank of North America in January 1782. They had accused Morris of profiteering in 1779 and Willing had voted against the Declaration of Independence. Although Morris did much to restore his reputation in 1780 and 1781, the credit for obtaining these critical loans to "organize" the Bank of North America for approval by Congress in December 1781 should go to Henry or John Laurens and Paine more than to Morris.

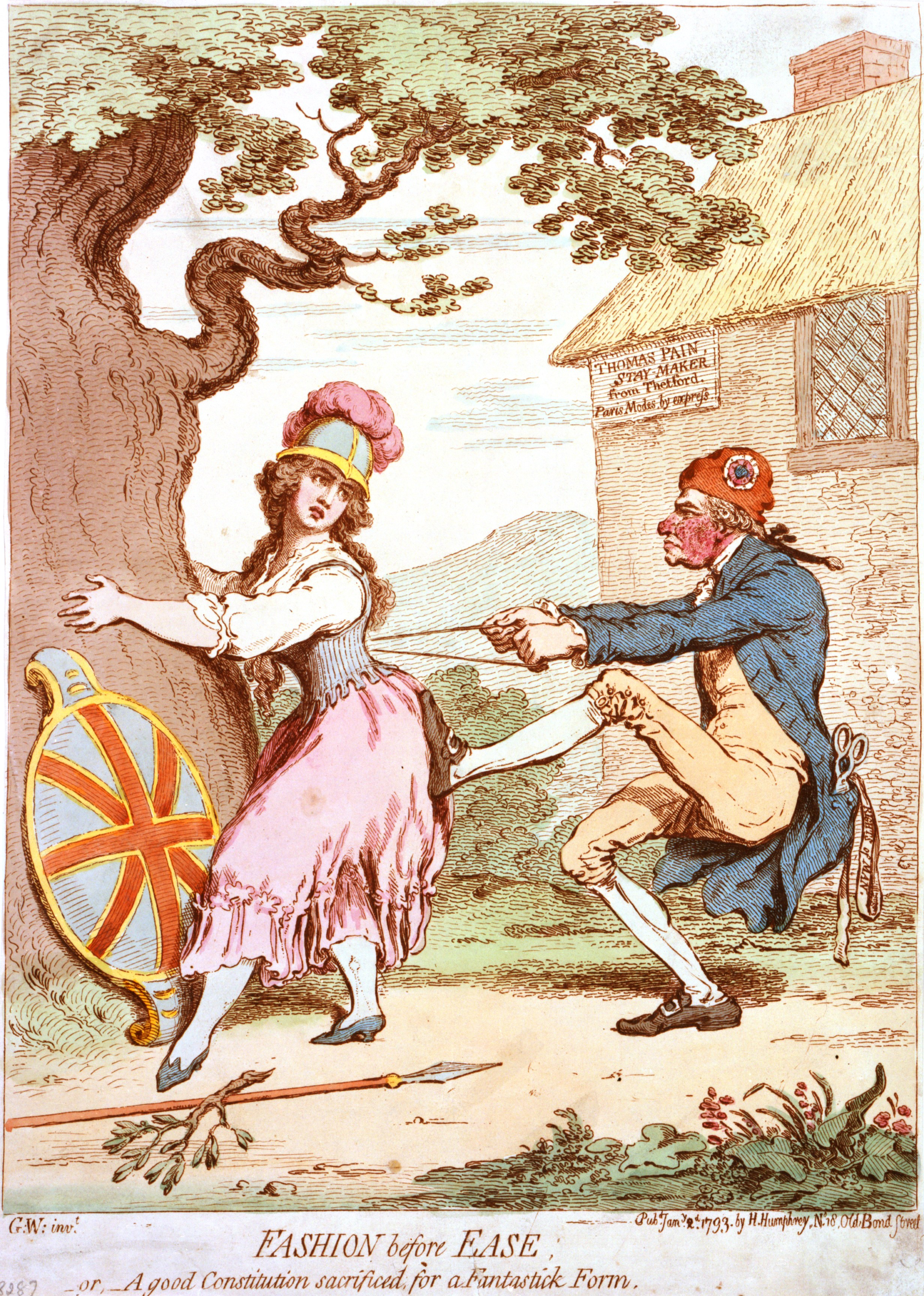
In Fashion before Ease; – or, – A good Constitution sacrificed for a Fantastick Form (1793), James Gillray caricatured Paine tightening the corset of Britannia and protruding from his coat pocket is a measuring tape inscribed "Rights of Man".

Paine bought his only house in 1783 on the corner of Farnsworth Avenue and Church Streets in Bordentown City, New Jersey and he lived in it periodically until his death in 1809. This is the only place in the world where Paine purchased real estate. In 1785, Paine was elected a member of the American Philosophical Society.

In 1787, Paine proposed an iron bridge design for crossing the Schuylkill River at Philadelphia. Having little success in acquiring funding, Paine returned to Paris, France seeking investors or other opportunities to implement his, at the time, novel iron bridge design. Because Paine had few friends when arriving in France aside from Lafayette and Jefferson, he continued to correspond heavily with Benjamin Franklin, a long time friend and mentor. Franklin provided letters of introduction for Paine to use to gain associates and contacts in France.

Later that year, Paine returned to London from Paris. He then released a pamphlet on August 20 called Prospects on the Rubicon: or, an investigation into the Causes and Consequences of the Politics to be Agitated at the Meeting of Parliament. Tensions between England and France were increasing, and this pamphlet urged the British Ministry to reconsider the consequences of war with France. Paine sought to turn the public opinion against the war to create better relations between the countries, avoid the taxes of war upon the citizens, and not engage in a war he believed would ruin both nations.

=== Later years ===
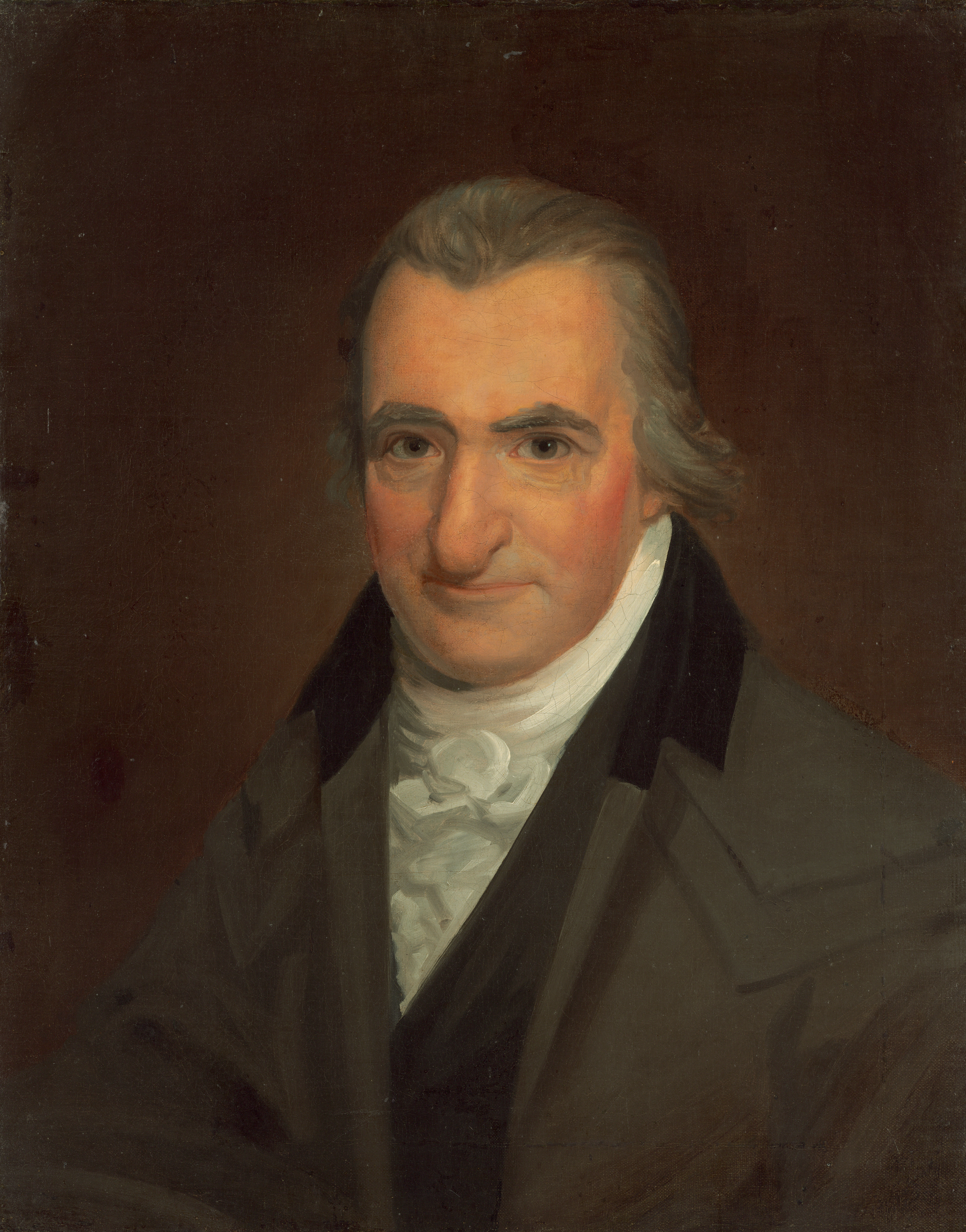
Portrait by John Wesley Jarvis, c. 1806–1807

Paine remained in France until 1802, returning to the United States only at President Jefferson's invitation. Paine also paid for the passage for Bonneville's wife Marguerite Brazier and the couple's three sons, Benjamin, Louis, and Thomas Bonneville, to whom Paine was godfather. Paine returned to the U.S. in the early stages of the Second Great Awakening and a time of great political partisanship. The Age of Reason gave ample excuse for the religiously devout to dislike him, while the Federalists attacked him for his ideas of government stated in Common Sense, for his association with the French Revolution, and for his friendship with President Jefferson. Also, still fresh in the minds of the public was his Letter to Washington, published six years before his return. This was compounded when his right to vote was denied in New Rochelle on the grounds that Gouverneur Morris did not recognize him as an American and Washington had not aided him.

Brazier took care of Paine at the end of his life and buried him after his death. In his will, Paine left the bulk of his estate to her, including 100 acres (40.5 ha) of his farm so she could maintain and educate Benjamin and his brother Thomas.

=== Death ===
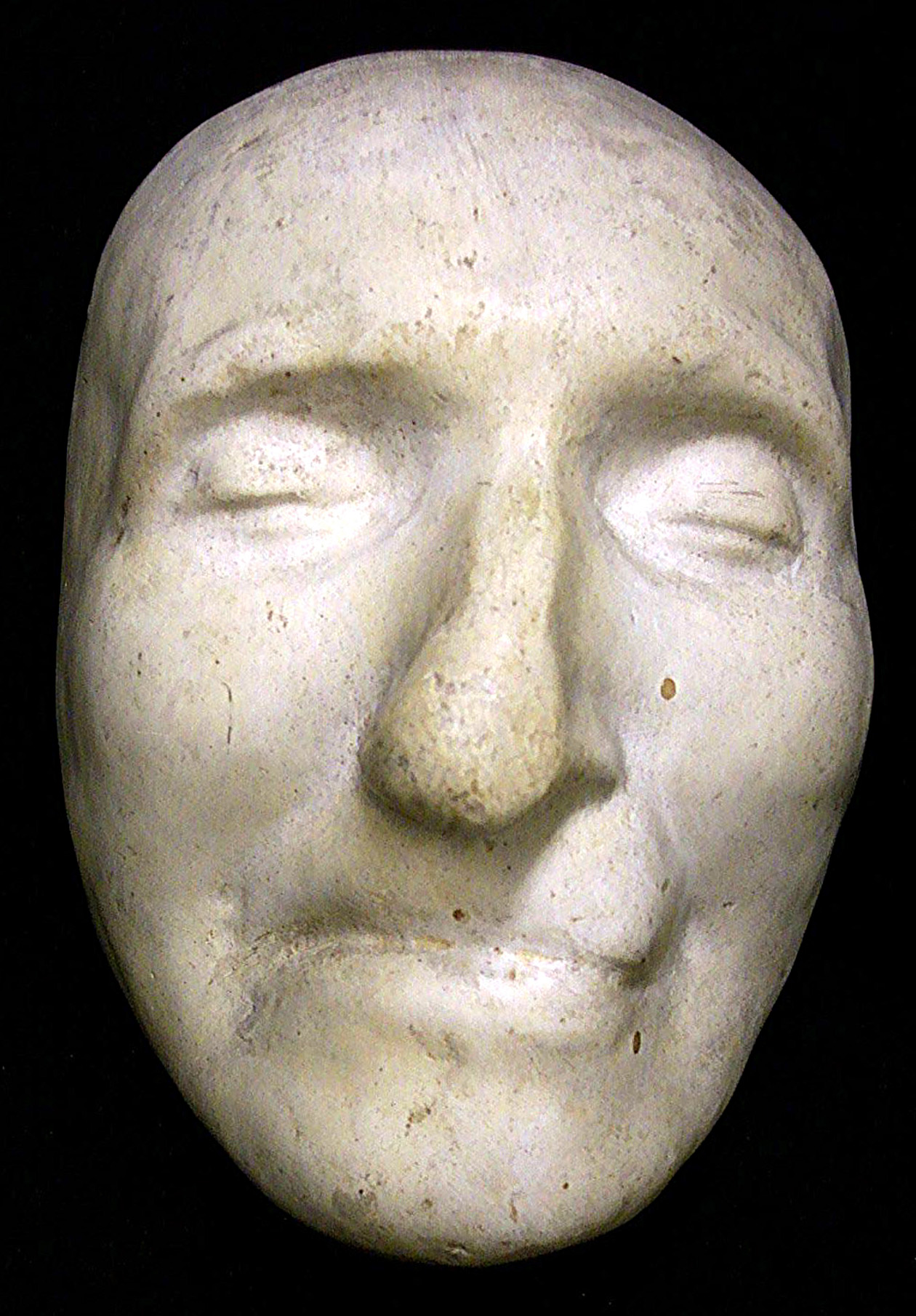
Paine's death mask

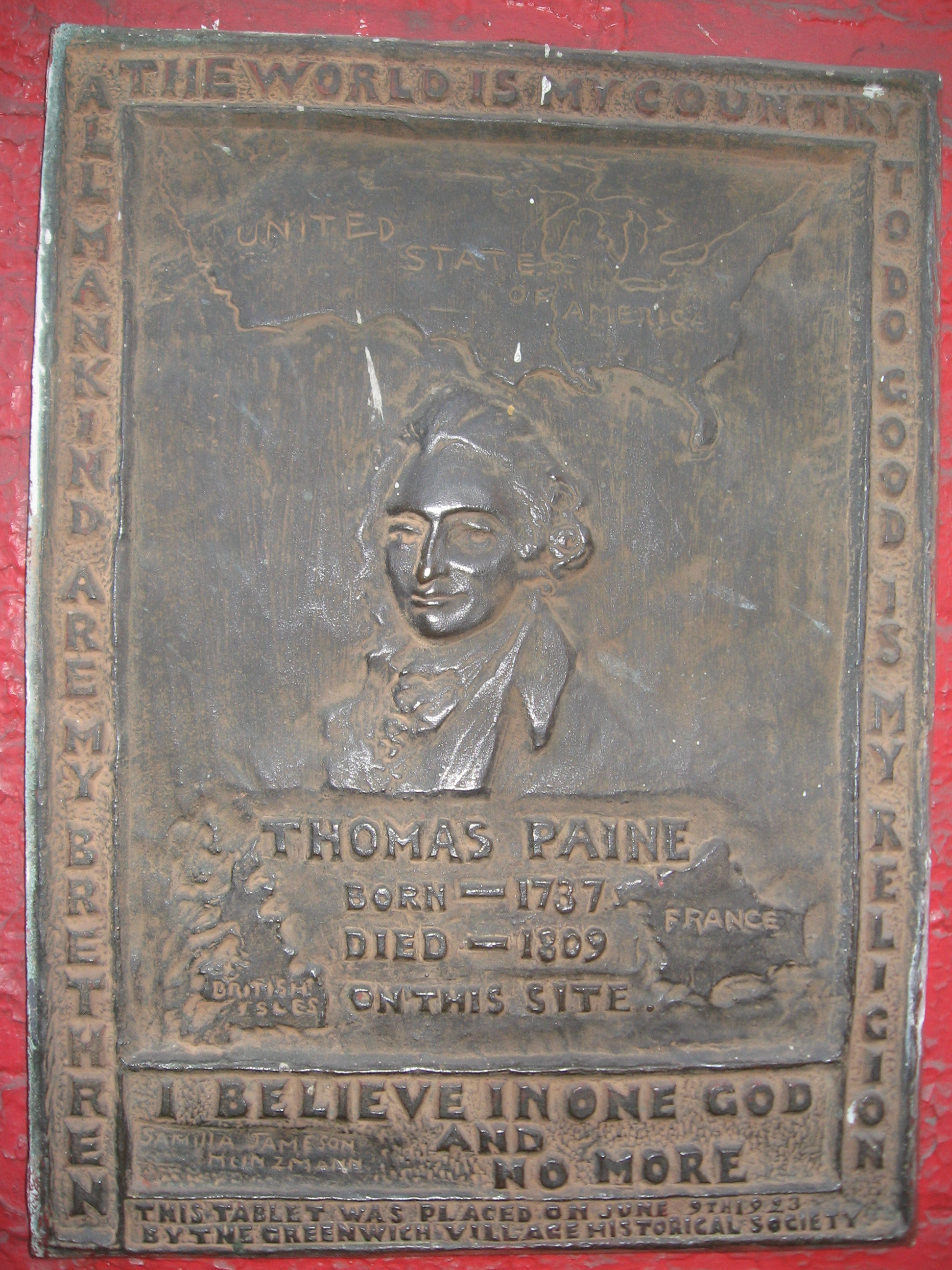
This plaque hangs on the site where Thomas Paine died, on Grove Street in Greenwich Village

On the morning of June 8, 1809, Paine died, aged 72, at 59 Grove Street in Greenwich Village, New York City. Although the original building no longer exists, the present building has a plaque noting that Paine died at this location.

After his death, Paine's body was brought to New Rochelle, but the Quakers would not allow it to be buried in their graveyard as per his last will, so his remains were buried under a walnut tree on his farm. In 1819, English agrarian radical journalist William Cobbett, who in 1793 had published a hostile continuation of Francis Oldys (George Chalmer)'s The Life of Thomas Paine, dug up his bones and transported them back to England with the intention to give Paine a heroic reburial on his native soil, but this never came to pass. The bones were still among Cobbett's effects when he died over fifteen years later but were later lost. There is no confirmed story about what happened to them after that, although various people have claimed throughout the years to own parts of Paine's remains, such as his skull and right hand.

At the time of his death, most American newspapers reprinted Paine's obituary notice from the New York Evening Post that was in turn quoting from The American Citizen, which read in part: "He had lived long, did some good, and much harm". Only six mourners came to his funeral, two of whom were black, most likely freedmen. Months later appeared a hostile biography by James Cheetham, who had admired him since the latter's days as a young radical in Manchester, and who had been friends with Paine for a short time before the two fell out. Many years later the writer and orator Robert G. Ingersoll wrote:

Thomas Paine had passed the legendary limit of life. One by one most of his old friends and acquaintances had deserted him. Maligned on every side, execrated, shunned and abhorred – his virtues denounced as vices – his services forgotten – his character blackened, he preserved the poise and balance of his soul. He was a victim of the people, but his convictions remained unshaken. He was still a soldier in the army of freedom, and still tried to enlighten and civilize those who were impatiently waiting for his death. Even those who loved their enemies hated him, their friend – the friend of the whole world – with all their hearts. On the 8th of June 1809, death came – Death, almost his only friend. At his funeral no pomp, no pageantry, no civic procession, no military display. In a carriage, a woman and her son who had lived on the bounty of the dead – on horseback, a Quaker, the humanity of whose heart dominated the creed of his head – and, following on foot, two negroes filled with gratitude – constituted the funeral cortege of Thomas Paine.

== Philosophy ==
Biographer Eric Foner identifies a utopian thread in Paine's thought, writing: "Through this new language he communicated a new vision – a utopian image of an egalitarian, republican society".

Paine's utopianism combined civic republicanism, belief in the inevitability of scientific and social progress and commitment to free markets and liberty generally. The multiple sources of Paine's political theory all pointed to a society based on the common good and individualism. Paine expressed a redemptive futurism or political messianism. Writing that his generation "would appear to the future as the Adam of a new world", Paine exemplified British utopianism.

Later, his encounters with the Indigenous peoples of the Americas made a deep impression. The ability of the Haudenosaunee to live in harmony with nature while achieving a democratic decision-making process helped him refine his thinking on how to organize society.

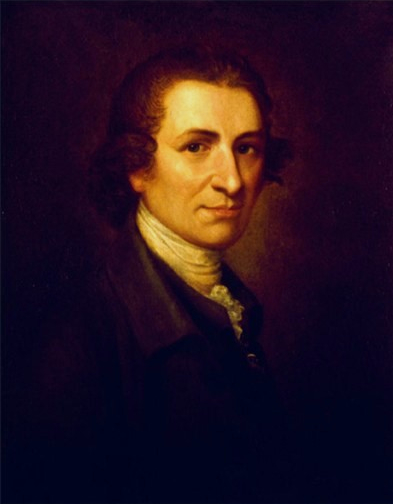
Portrait of Thomas Paine by Matthew Pratt, 1785–1795

=== France and Rights of Man ===
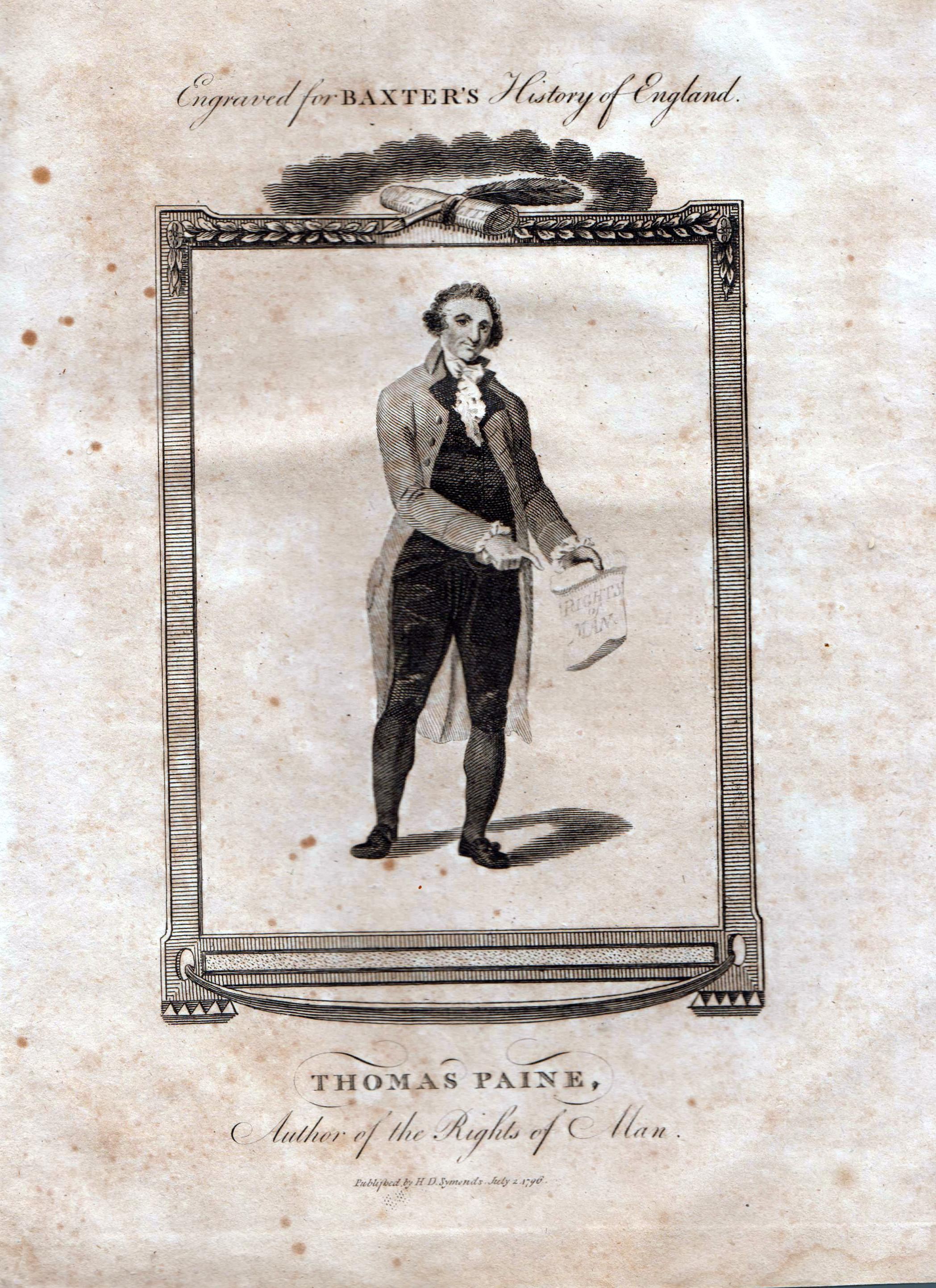
Thomas Paine Author of the Rights of Man from John Baxter's Impartial History of England, 1796

Back in London by 1787, Paine would become engrossed in the French Revolution that began two years later and decided to travel to France in 1790. Meanwhile, conservative intellectual Edmund Burke launched a counterrevolutionary blast against the French Revolution, entitled Reflections on the Revolution in France (1790), which strongly appealed to the landed class, and sold 30,000 copies. Paine set out to refute it in his Rights of Man (1791). He wrote it not as a quick pamphlet, but as a long, abstract political tract of 90,000 words which tore apart monarchies and traditional social institutions. On January 31, 1791, he gave the manuscript to publisher Joseph Johnson. A visit by government agents dissuaded Johnson, so Paine gave the book to publisher J. S. Jordan, then went to Paris, on William Blake's advice. He charged three good friends, William Godwin, Thomas Brand Hollis, and Thomas Holcroft, with handling publication details. The book appeared on March 13, 1791, and sold nearly a million copies. It was "eagerly read by reformers, Protestant dissenters, democrats, London craftsmen, and the skilled factory-hands of the new industrial north".

English satirist James Gillray ridicules Paine in Paris awaiting sentence of execution from three hanging judges.

Undeterred by the government campaign to discredit him, Paine issued his Rights of Man, Part the Second, Combining Principle and Practice in February 1792. Detailing a representative government with enumerated social programs to remedy the numbing poverty of commoners through progressive tax measures, Paine went much farther than such contemporaries as James Burgh, Robert Potter, John Scott, John Sinclair or Adam Smith. Radically reduced in price to ensure unprecedented circulation, it was sensational in its impact and gave birth to reform societies. An indictment for seditious libel followed, for both publisher and author, while government agents followed Paine and instigated mobs, hate meetings, and burnings in effigy. A fierce pamphlet war also resulted, in which Paine was defended and assailed in dozens of works. The authorities aimed, with ultimate success, to force Paine out of Great Britain. He was then tried in absentia and found guilty, but he was beyond the reach of British law. The French translation of Rights of Man, Part II was published in April 1792. The translator, François Lanthenas, eliminated the dedication to Lafayette, as he believed Paine thought too highly of Lafayette, who was seen as a royalist sympathizer at the time.

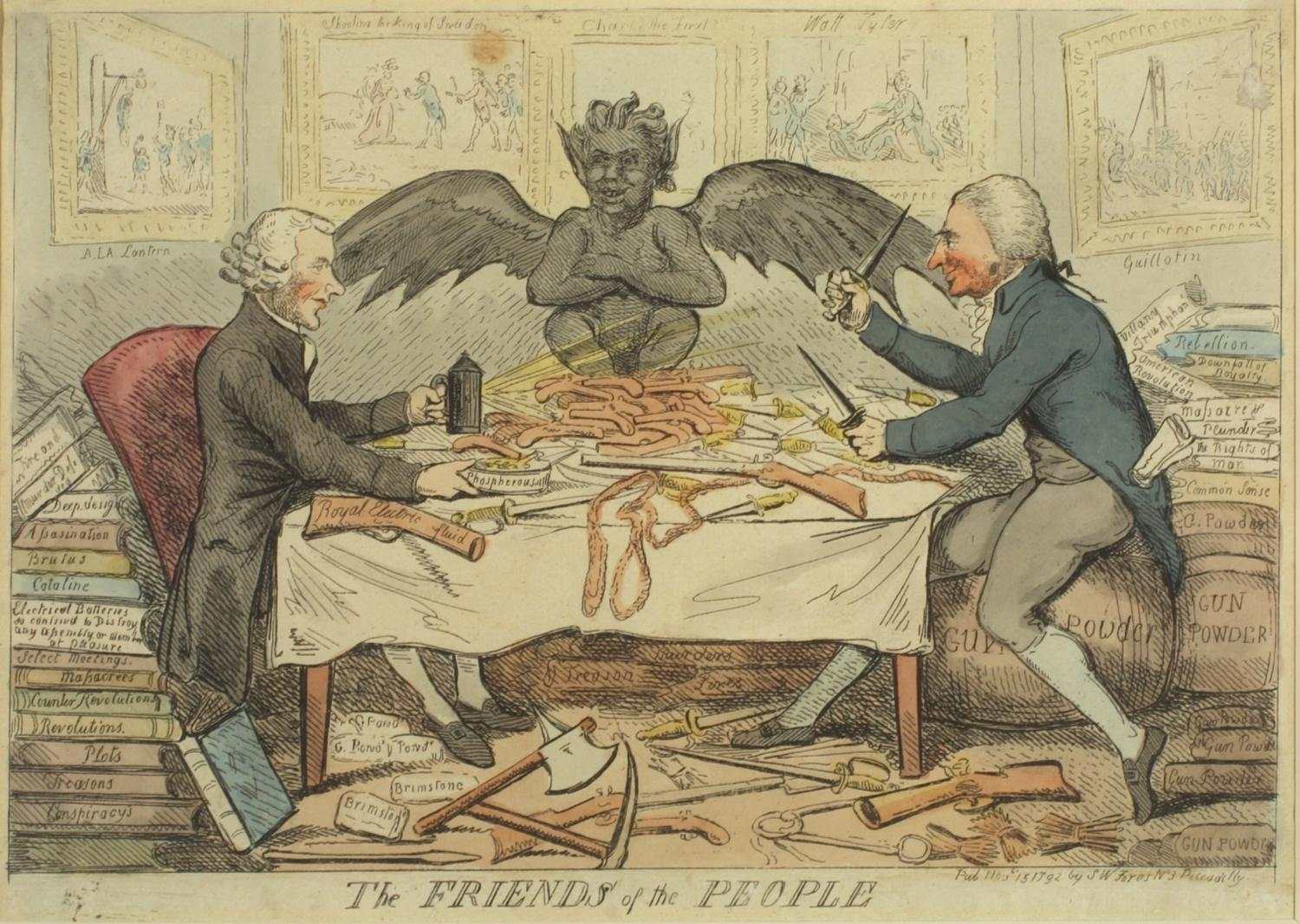
The Friends of the People caricatured by Isaac Cruikshank, November 15, 1792. Joseph Priestley and Thomas Paine are surrounded by incendiary items.

In summer of 1792, he answered the sedition and libel charges thus: "If, to expose the fraud and imposition of monarchy ... to promote universal peace, civilization, and commerce, and to break the chains of political superstition, and raise degraded man to his proper rank; if these things be libellous ... let the name of libeller be engraved on my tomb."

Paine was an enthusiastic supporter of the French Revolution and was granted honorary French citizenship alongside prominent contemporaries such as Alexander Hamilton, George Washington, Benjamin Franklin and others. Paine's honorary citizenship was in recognition of the publishing of his Rights of Man, Part II and the sensation it created within France. Despite his inability to speak French, he was elected to the National Convention, representing the district of Pas-de-Calais.

Several weeks after his election to the National Convention, Paine was selected as one of nine deputies to be part of the convention's Constitutional Committee, charged to draft a suitable constitution for the French Republic. He subsequently participated in the Constitutional Committee in drafting the Girondin constitutional project. He voted for the French Republic, but argued against the execution of Louis XVI, referred to as Louis Capet following his deposition, saying the monarch should instead be exiled to the United States: firstly, because of the way royalist France had come to the aid of the American Revolution; and secondly, because of a moral objection to capital punishment in general and to revenge killings in particular. Paine's speech in defense of Louis XVI was interrupted by Jean-Paul Marat, who claimed that, as a Quaker, Paine's religious beliefs ran counter to inflicting capital punishment and thus he should be ineligible to vote. Marat interrupted a second time, stating that the interpreter was deceiving the convention by distorting the meanings of Paine's words, prompting Paine to provide a copy of the speech as proof that he was being correctly interpreted.

Paine wrote the second part of Rights of Man on a desk in Thomas 'Clio' Rickman's house, with whom he was staying in 1792 before he fled to France. This desk is currently on display in the People's History Museum in Manchester.

Regarded as an ally of the Girondins, he was seen with increasing disfavor by the Montagnards, who were now in power after the Insurrection of 31 May – 2 June 1793. Paine was under scrutiny by the authorities also because he was a personal adversary of Gouverneur Morris, who was the American ambassador in France and a friend of George Washington. The revolutionary government, both the Committee of Public Safety and the Committee of General Security, sought to gain the favor of the American ambassador, not wanting to risk the alliance with the United States; therefore, they were more inclined to focus on Paine.

=== The Age of Reason ===
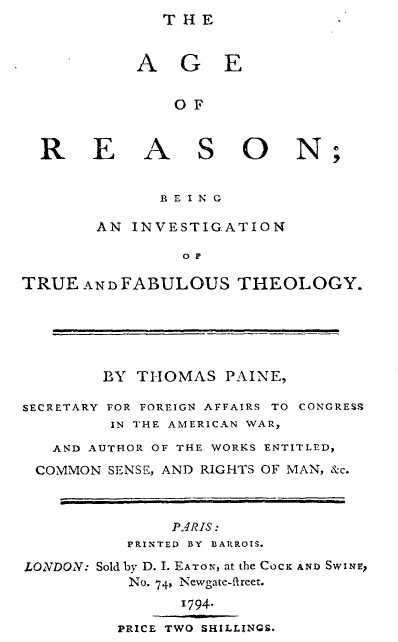
Title page from the first English edition of Part I

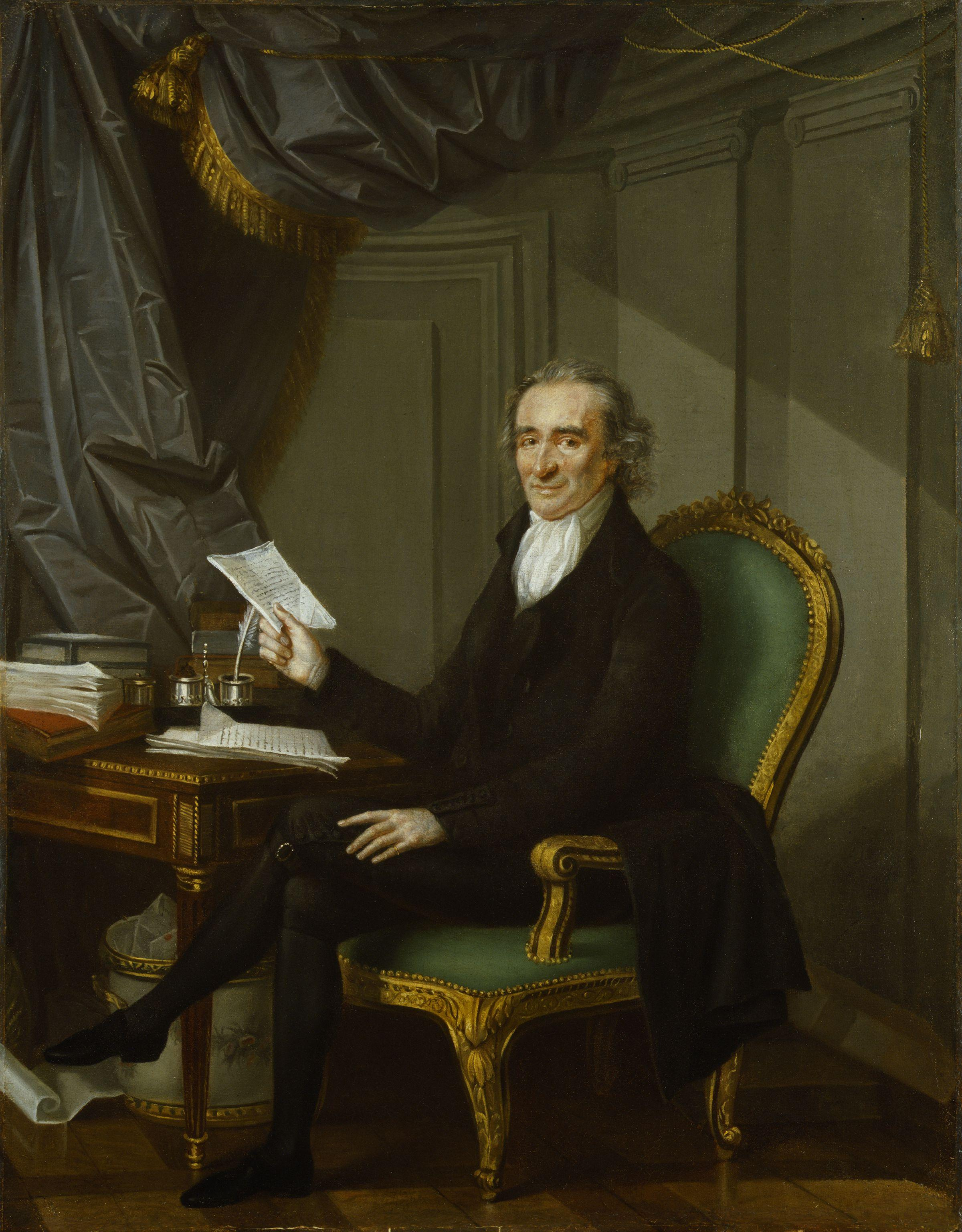
Oil painting by Laurent Dabos, c. 1791

Paine was arrested in France on December 28, 1793, following the orders of Vadier. Joel Barlow was unsuccessful in securing Paine's release by circulating a petition among American residents in Paris. He was treated as a political prisoner by the Committee of General Security. Sixteen American citizens were allowed to plead for Paine's release to the convention, yet President Marc-Guillaume Alexis Vadier of the Committee of General Security refused to acknowledge Paine's American citizenship, stating he was an Englishman and therefore a citizen of a country at war with France. Paine protested and claimed that he was a citizen of the U.S. However, Ambassador Morris did not press his claim, and Paine later wrote that Morris had connived at his imprisonment.

Paine narrowly escaped execution. A chalk mark was supposed to be left by the jailer on the door of a cell to denote that the prisoner inside was due to be removed for execution. In Paine's case, the mark had accidentally been made on the inside of his door rather than the outside because the door had been left open when the jailer was making his rounds that day, since Paine had been receiving official visitors. But for this quirk of fate, Paine would have been executed the following morning. He thus survived the few vital days needed to be spared by the fall of Robespierre on 9 Thermidor (July 27, 1794).

Paine was released in November 1794 largely because of the work of the new American ambassador to France, James Monroe, who successfully argued the case for Paine's U.S. citizenship. In July 1795, he was re-admitted into the convention, as were other surviving Girondins. Paine, depressed and ill as a result of his imprisonment, had stayed silent in the period immediately following his release but on July 8, with the encouragement of Lanthenas, he spoke in the convention. Paine was one of only three députés to oppose the adoption of the new 1795 constitution, because it eliminated universal suffrage, which had been proclaimed, at least for men, by the Montagnard Constitution of 1793.

In addition to receiving a British patent for a single-span iron bridge, Paine developed a smokeless candle and worked with inventor John Fitch in developing steam engines.

In 1797, Paine lived in Paris with Nicholas Bonneville and his wife, Marguerite Brazier. As well as Bonneville's other controversial guests, Paine aroused the suspicions of authorities. Bonneville hid the Royalist Antoine Joseph Barruel-Beauvert at his home. Beauvert had been outlawed following the coup of 18 Fructidor on September 4, 1797. Paine believed that the United States under President John Adams had betrayed revolutionary France.

In 1800, still under police surveillance, Bonneville took refuge with his father in Evreux. Paine stayed on with him, helping Bonneville with the burden of translating the "Covenant Sea". The same year, Paine purportedly had a meeting with Napoleon Bonaparte. Napoleon claimed he slept with a copy of Rights of Man (French: Les Droits de l'Homme) under his pillow and went so far as to say to Paine that "a statue of gold should be erected to you in every city in the universe". Paine discussed with Napoleon how best to invade England. In December 1797, he had written two essays, one of which was pointedly named Observations on the Construction and Operation of Navies with a Plan for an Invasion of England and the Final Overthrow of the English Government, in which he promoted the idea to finance 1,000 gunboats to carry a French invading army across the English Channel. In 1804, Paine returned to the subject, writing To the People of England on the Invasion of England advocating the idea. However, upon noting Napoleon's progress towards dictatorship, he condemned him as "the completest charlatan that ever existed".

==== Criticism of George Washington ====
Upset that President Washington, a friend since the Revolutionary War, did nothing during Paine's imprisonment in France, Paine believed Washington had betrayed him and conspired with Robespierre. While staying with Monroe, Paine planned to send Washington a letter of grievance on the president's birthday. Monroe stopped the letter from being sent, and after Paine's criticism of the Jay Treaty, which was supported by Washington, Monroe suggested that Paine live elsewhere.

Paine then sent a stinging letter to Washington, in which he described him as an incompetent commander and a vain and ungrateful person. Having received no response, Paine contacted his longtime publisher Benjamin Bache, the Jeffersonian democrat, to publish his Letter to George Washington of 1796 in which he derided Washington's reputation by describing him as a treacherous man who was unworthy of his fame as a military and political hero. Paine wrote that "the world will be puzzled to decide whether you are an apostate or an impostor; whether you have abandoned good principles or whether you ever had any". He declared that without France's aid Washington could not have succeeded in the American Revolution and had "but little share in the glory of the final event". He also commented on Washington's character, saying that Washington had no sympathetic feelings and was a hypocrite.

=== Slavery ===
Paine was critical of slavery and declared himself to be an abolitionist. As secretary to the Pennsylvania legislature, he helped draft legislation to outlaw Patriot involvement in the international slave trade. Paine's statement, "Man has no property in man", although used by him in Rights of Man to deny the right of any generation to bind future ones, has also been interpreted as an argument against slavery. In the book, Paine also describes his mission, among other things, as to "break the chains of slavery and oppression".

On March 8, 1775, one month after Paine became the editor of The Pennsylvania Magazine, the magazine published an anonymous article titled "African Slavery in America", the first prominent piece in the colonies proposing the emancipation of African-American slaves and the abolition of slavery. Paine is often credited with writing the piece, on the basis of later testimony by Benjamin Rush, cosigner of the Declaration of Independence.

During the American Revolutionary War, the British implemented several policies that allowed fugitive slaves fleeing from American enslavers to find refuge within British lines. Writing in response to these policies, Paine wrote in Common Sense that Britain "hath stirred up the Indians and the Negroes to destroy us". Paine, together with Joel Barlow, unsuccessfully tried to convince President Jefferson not to import the institution of slavery to the territory acquired in the Louisiana Purchase, suggesting he rather settle it with free Black families and German immigrants.

=== State funded social programs ===
In his Rights of Man, Part Second, Paine advocated a comprehensive program of state support for the population to ensure the welfare of society, including state subsidy for poor people, state-financed universal public education, and state-sponsored prenatal care and postnatal care, including state subsidies to families at childbirth. Recognizing that a person's "labor ought to be over" before old age, Paine also called for a state pension to all workers starting at age 50, which would be doubled at age 60.

=== Agrarian Justice ===
His last pamphlet, Agrarian Justice, published in the winter of 1795, opposed agrarian law and agrarian monopoly and further developed his ideas in the Rights of Man about how land ownership separated the majority of people from their rightful, natural inheritance and means of independent survival. The U.S. Social Security Administration recognizes Agrarian Justice as the first American proposal for an old-age pension and basic income or citizen's dividend. Per Agrarian Justice:

In advocating the case of the persons thus dispossessed, it is a right, and not a charity ... [Government must] create a national fund, out of which there shall be paid to every person, when arrived at the age of twenty-one years, the sum of fifteen pounds sterling, as a compensation in part, for the loss of his or her natural inheritance, by the introduction of the system of landed property. And also, the sum of ten pounds per annum, during life, to every person now living, of the age of fifty years, and to all others as they shall arrive at that age.

In this pamphlet he argued "All accumulation of personal property, beyond what a man's own hands produce, is derived to him by living in society; and he owes on every principle of justice, of gratitude, and of civilization, a part of that accumulation back again to society from whence the whole came".

Lamb argues that Paine's analysis of property rights marks a distinct contribution to political theory. His theory of property defends a libertarian concern with private ownership that shows an egalitarian commitment. Paine's new justification of property sets him apart from previous theorists such as Hugo Grotius, Samuel von Pufendorf and John Locke. Lamb says it demonstrates Paine's commitment to foundational liberal values of individual freedom and moral equality. In response to Paine's "Agrarian Justice", Thomas Spence wrote "The Rights of Infants" wherein he argued that Paine's plan was not beneficial to impoverished people because landlords would just keep raising land prices, further enriching themselves rather than giving the commonwealth an equal chance.

=== Fiat currency ===
Paine was strongly opposed to fiat money, which he viewed as counterfeiting by the state. He said "The punishment of a member [of a legislature] who should move for such a law ought to be death". As part of his essay Dissertations on Government, etc., published in February 1786, Paine included a scathing condemnation of paper money emphasizing "The pretense for paper money has been, that there was not a sufficiency of gold and silver. This, so far from being a reason for paper emissions, is a reason against them."

The essay also states,

AS to the assumed authority of any Assembly in making paper money, or paper of any kind, a legal tender, or in other language, a compulsive payment, it is a most presumptuous attempt at arbitrary power. There can be no such power in a Republican government: The people have no freedom, and property no security where this practice can be acted: And the Committee who shall bring in a report for this purpose, or the Member who moves for it, and he who seconds it merits impeachment, and sooner or later may expect it.

— Thomas Paine, Dissertations on Government

Paine also believed that paper money would create a nation of "stock-jobbers," people who engage in speculative trading, and eventually destroys the nation's morality. Paine explains that this is because the paper money has no real value by itself so the value is contingent on unpredictable forces such as luck and politics. This leads to manipulation of the paper money for profit.

== Religious views ==
Before his arrest and imprisonment in France, knowing that he would probably be arrested and executed, following in the tradition of early 18th-century English Deism, Paine wrote the first part of The Age of Reason (1793–1794). Paine's religious views as expressed in The Age of Reason caused quite a stir in religious society, effectively splitting the religious groups into two major factions: those who wanted church disestablishment, and the Christians who wanted Christianity to continue having a strong social influence.

About his own religious beliefs, Paine wrote in The Age of Reason:

I believe in one God, and no more; and I hope for happiness beyond this life.

I do not believe in the creed professed by the Jewish church, by the Roman church, by the Greek church, by the Turkish church, by the Protestant church, nor by any church that I know of. My own mind is my own church. All national institutions of churches, whether Jewish, Christian or Turkish, appear to me no other than human inventions, set up to terrify and enslave mankind, and monopolize power and profit.

Whenever we read the obscene stories, the voluptuous debaucheries, the cruel and tortuous executions, the unrelenting vindictiveness with which more than half the Bible is filled, it would be more consistent that we call it the word of a demon than the word of God. It is a history of wickedness that has served to corrupt and brutalize mankind; and, for my part, I sincerely detest it, as I detest everything that is cruel.

Though there is no definitive evidence Paine himself was a Freemason, upon his return to America from France he penned "An Essay on the Origin of Free-Masonry" (1803–1805) about Freemasonry being derived from the religion of the ancient Druids. Marguerite de Bonneville published the essay in 1810 after Paine's death, but she chose to omit certain passages from it that were critical of Christianity, most of which were restored in an 1818 printing. In the essay, Paine stated that "the Christian religion is a parody on the worship of the Sun, in which they put a man whom they call Christ, in the place of the Sun, and pay him the same adoration which was originally paid to the Sun." Paine also had a negative attitude toward Judaism. While never describing himself as a Deist, he openly advocated Deism in his writings, and called Deism "the only true religion":

The opinions I have advanced ... are the effect of the most clear and long-established conviction that the Bible and the Testament are impositions upon the world, that the fall of man, the account of Jesus Christ being the Son of God, and of his dying to appease the wrath of God, and of salvation, by that strange means, are all fabulous inventions, dishonorable to the wisdom and power of the Almighty; that the only true religion is Deism, by which I then meant, and mean now, the belief of one God, and an imitation of his moral character, or the practice of what are called moral virtues – and that it was upon this only (so far as religion is concerned) that I rested all my hopes of happiness hereafter. So say I now – and so help me God.

== Legacy ==
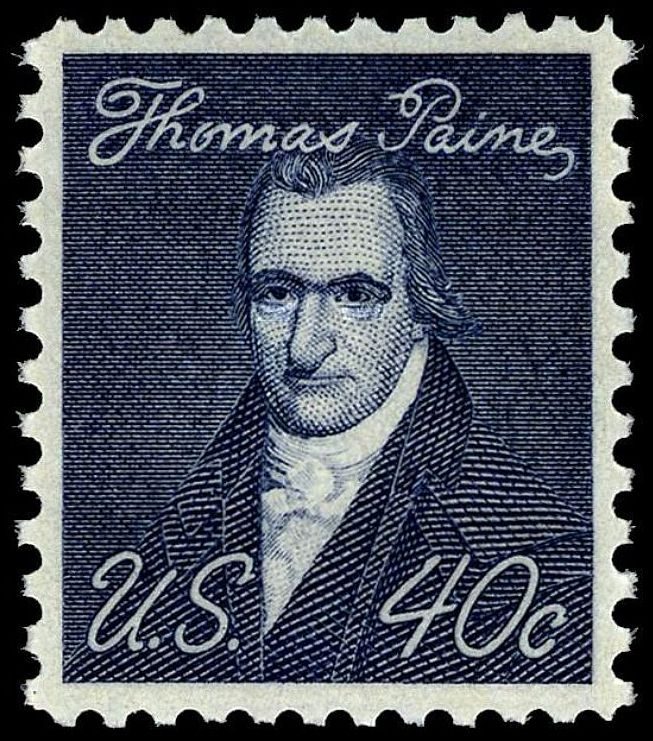
In 1969, a Prominent Americans series stamp honoring Paine, with his signature at top, was issued.

Historian Jack P. Greene stated:

In a fundamental sense, we are today all Paine's children. It was not the British defeat at Yorktown, but Paine and the new American conception of political society he did so much to popularize in Europe that turned the world upside down.

Harvey J. Kaye wrote that Paine and his pamphlets and catchphrases such as "The sun never shined on a cause of greater worth", "We have it in our power to begin the world over again", and "These are the times that try men's souls" did more than move Americans to declare their independence:

[H]e also imbued the nation they were founding with democratic impulse and aspiration and exceptional – indeed, world-historic – purpose and promise. For 230 years Americans have drawn ideas, inspiration, and encouragement from Paine and his work.

John Stevenson argues that in the early 1790s, numerous radical political societies were formed throughout England and Wales in which Paine's writings provided "a boost to the self-confidence of those seeking to participate in politics for the first time." In its immediate effects, Gary Kates argues, "Paine's vision unified Philadelphia merchants, British artisans, French peasants, Dutch reformers, and radical intellectuals from Boston to Berlin in one great movement."

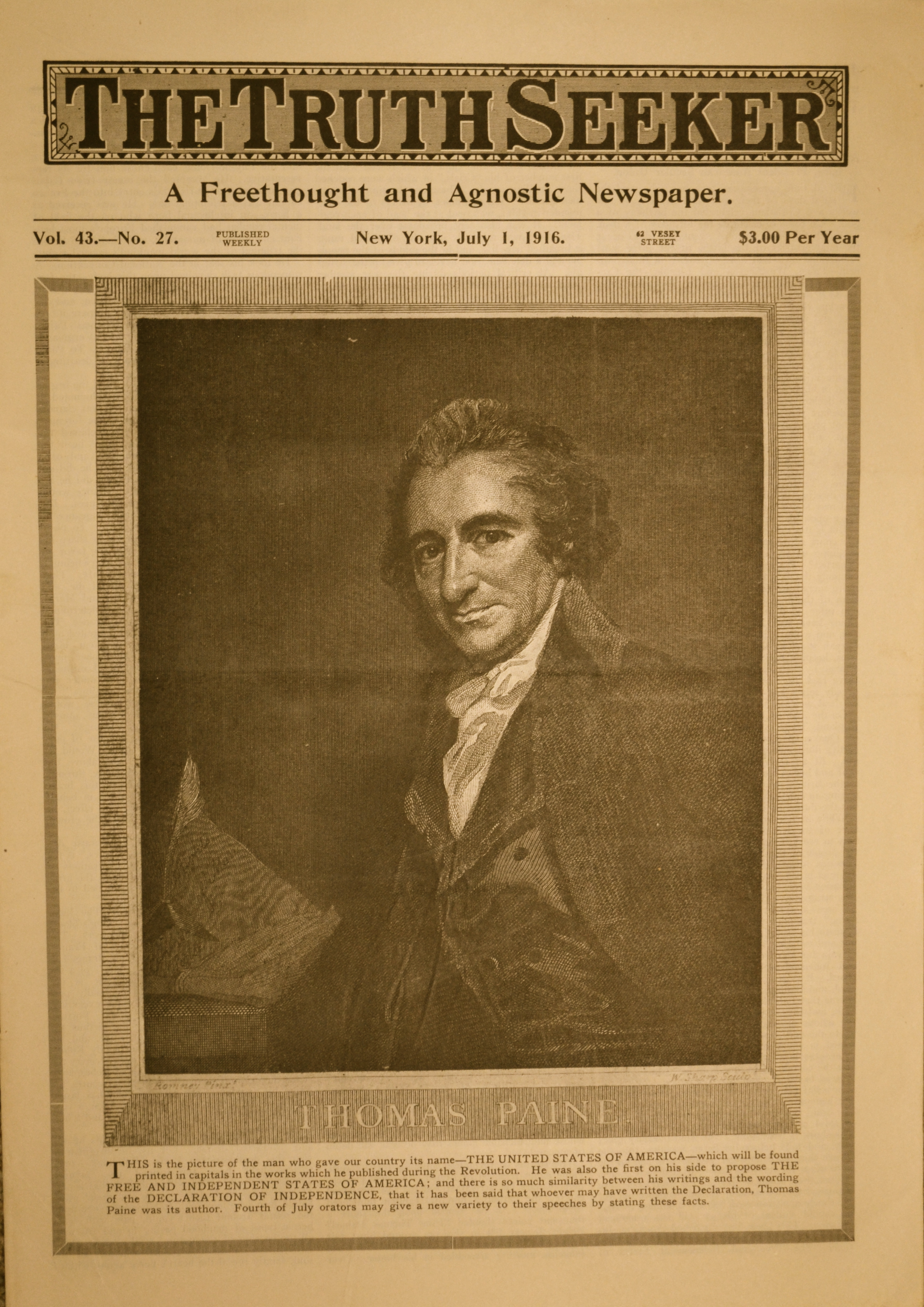
Since its founding in 1873, the American freethought periodical – The Truth Seeker – has championed Thomas Paine.

His writings in the long term inspired philosophic and working-class radicals in Britain and United States. Liberals, libertarians, feminists, democratic socialists, social democrats, anarchists, free thinkers and progressives often claim him as an intellectual ancestor. Paine's critique of institutionalized religion and advocacy of rational thinking influenced many British freethinkers in the 19th and 20th centuries, such as William Cobbett, George Holyoake, Charles Bradlaugh, Christopher Hitchens and Bertrand Russell.

The quote "Lead, follow, or get out of the way" is widely misattributed to Paine. It can be found nowhere in his published works.

=== Abraham Lincoln ===
In 1835, when he was 26 years old, Abraham Lincoln wrote a defense of Paine's deism. A political associate, Samuel Hill, burned the manuscript to save Lincoln's political career. Historian Roy Basler, the editor of Lincoln's papers, said Paine had a strong influence on Lincoln's style:

No other writer of the eighteenth century, with the exception of Jefferson, parallels more closely the temper or gist of Lincoln's later thought. In style, Paine above all others affords the variety of eloquence which, chastened and adapted to Lincoln's own mood, is revealed in Lincoln's formal writings.

=== Thomas Edison ===
The inventor Thomas Edison said:

I have always regarded Paine as one of the greatest of all Americans. Never have we had a sounder intelligence in this republic.... It was my good fortune to encounter Thomas Paine's works in my boyhood... it was, indeed, a revelation to me to read that great thinker's views on political and theological subjects. Paine educated me, then, about many matters of which I had never before thought. I remember, very vividly, the flash of enlightenment that shone from Paine's writings, and I recall thinking, at that time, 'What a pity these works are not today the schoolbooks for all children!' My interest in Paine was not satisfied by my first reading of his works. I went back to them time and again, just as I have done since my boyhood days.

=== South America ===
In 1811, Venezuelan translator Manuel García de Sena published a book in Philadelphia that consisted mostly of Spanish translations of several of Paine's most important works. The book also included translations of the Declaration of Independence, the Articles of Confederation, the U.S. Constitution and the constitutions of five U.S. states.

It subsequently circulated widely in South America and through it Uruguayan national hero José Gervasio Artigas became familiar with and embraced Paine's ideas. In turn, many of Artigas's writings drew directly from Paine's, including the Instructions of 1813, which Uruguayans consider to be one of their country's most important constitutional documents, and was one of the earliest writings to articulate a principled basis for an identity independent of Buenos Aires.

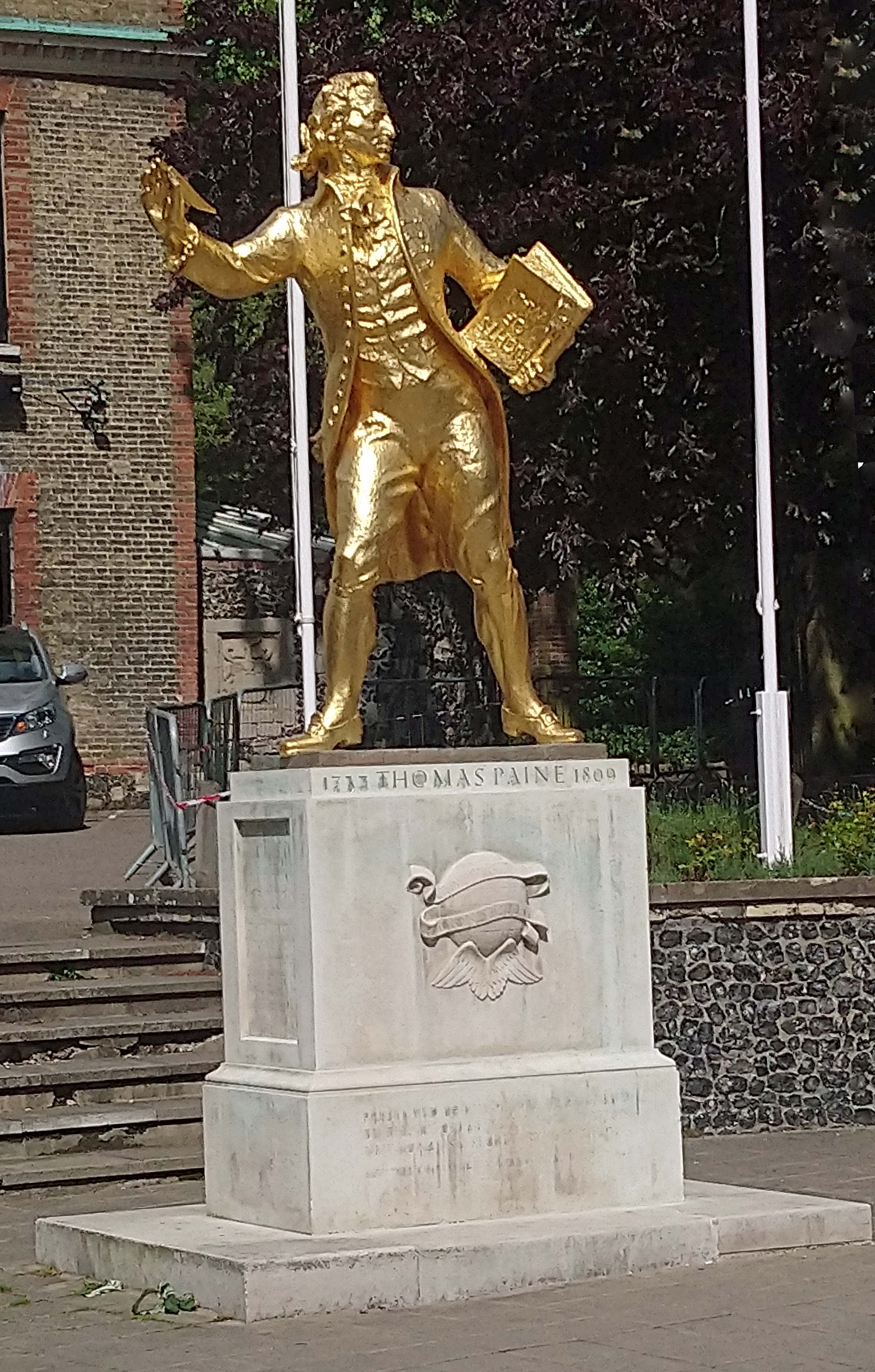
Monument, Kings Street, Thetford

=== Memorials ===
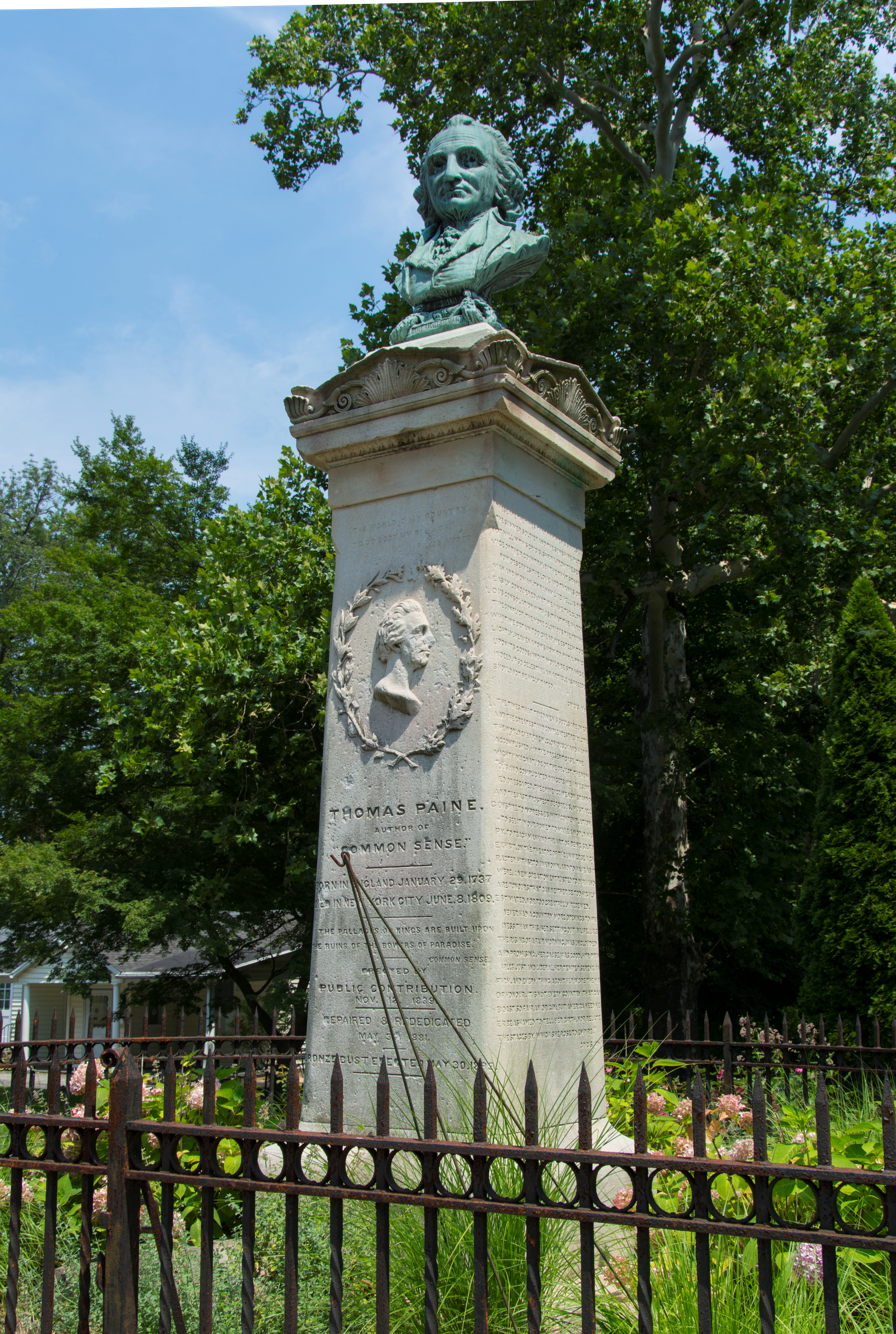
The Thomas Paine Monument

The first and longest-standing memorial to Paine is the carved and inscribed 12-foot marble column in New Rochelle, New York, organized and funded by publisher, educator and reformer Gilbert Vale (1791–1866) and raised in 1839 by the American sculptor and architect John Frazee, the Thomas Paine Monument (see image below).

New Rochelle is also the original site of Thomas Paine's Cottage, which along with a 320-acre (130 ha) farm were presented to Paine in 1784 by act of the New York State Legislature for his services in the American Revolution. The same site is the home of the Thomas Paine Memorial Museum.

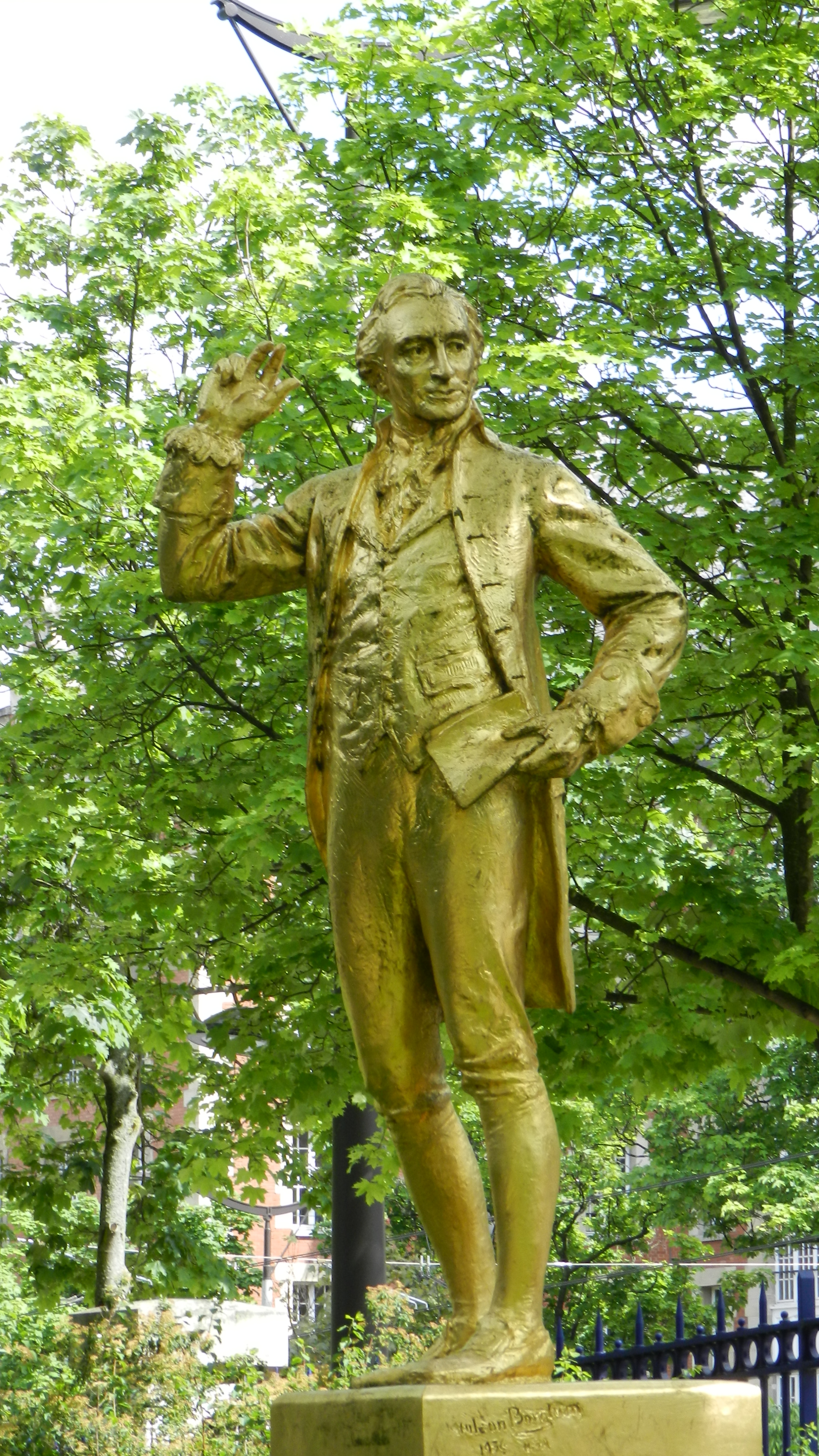
Statue of Thomas Paine in Parc Montsouris, Paris, dedicated in 1948

In the 20th century, Joseph Lewis, longtime president of the Freethinkers of America and an ardent Paine admirer, was instrumental in having larger-than-life-sized statues of Paine erected in each of the three countries with which the revolutionary writer was associated. The first, created by Mount Rushmore sculptor Gutzon Borglum, was erected in the Parc Montsouris, Paris, just before World War II began but not formally dedicated until 1948. It depicts Paine standing before the French National Convention to plead for the life of King Louis XVI. The second, sculpted in 1950 by Georg J. Lober, was erected near Paine's one-time home in Morristown, New Jersey. It shows a seated Paine using a drumhead as a makeshift table. The third, sculpted by Sir Charles Wheeler, President of the Royal Academy, was erected in 1964 in Paine's birthplace, Thetford, England. With a quill pen in his right hand and an inverted copy of The Rights of Man in his left, it occupies a prominent location on King Street. Thomas Paine was ranked No. 34 in the 100 Greatest Britons 2002 extensive Nationwide poll conducted by the BBC.

=== In popular culture ===
- In 1987, Richard Thomas appeared on stage in Philadelphia and Washington, DC, in the one-man play Citizen Tom Paine (an adaptation of Howard Fast's 1943 novel of the same title), playing Paine "like a star-spangled tiger, ferocious about freedom and ready to savage anyone who stands in his way", in a staging of the play in the bicentennial year of the United States Constitution.
- In 1995, the English folk singer Graham Moore released a song called Tom Paine's Bones on an album of the same name. The song has since been covered by a number of other artists, including Dick Gaughan, Grace Petrie, the Finns, The Shee and Trials of Cato.
- In 2005, Trevor Griffiths published These are the Times: A Life of Thomas Paine, originally written as a screenplay for Richard Attenborough Productions. Although the film was not made, the play was broadcast as a two-part drama on BBC Radio 4 in 2008, with a repeat in 2012.
- In 2009, Paine's life was dramatized in the play Thomas Paine Citizen of the World, produced for the "Tom Paine 200 Celebrations" festival

== See also ==
- Asset-based egalitarianism
- British philosophy
- Contributions to liberal theory
- Liberty
- List of American philosophers
- List of British philosophers
- List of civil rights leaders
- Society of the Friends of Truth
- Early American publishers and printers
- Influence of the American Revolution on the French Revolution

== Bibliography ==
- Afsai, Shai (November 7, 2016). "Thomas Paine, Deism, and the Masonic Fraternity". Journal of the American Revolution. Archived from the original on April 20, 2021.
- Aldridge, A. Owen (1959). Man of Reason: The Life of Thomas Paine. Lippincott.
- Aldridge, A. Owen (1984). Thomas Paine's American Ideology. University of Delaware Press. ISBN 978-0874132601. Archived from the original on February 7, 2021.
- Ayer, A. J. (1988). Thomas Paine. University of Chicago Press.
- Bailyn, Bernard (1990). "Common Sense". In Bailyn, Bernard (ed.). Faces of Revolution: Personalities and Themes in the Struggle for American Independence. Alfred A. Knopf.
- Bernstein, R. B. (1994). "Review Essay: Rediscovering Thomas Paine". New York Law School Law Review.
- Butler, Marilyn (1984). Burke Paine and Godwin and the Revolution Controversy.
- Chiu, Frances (2020). The Routledge Guidebook to Paine's Rights of Man. Routledge. ISBN 978-0415703925.
- Claeys, Gregory (1989). Thomas Paine, Social and Political Thought. London: Unwin Hyman. ISBN 978-0203193204. Archived from the original on February 4, 2021.
- Conway, Moncure Daniel (1892). The Life of Thomas Paine. G.P. Putnam's Sons.
- Ferguson, Robert A. (July 2000). "The Commonalities of Common Sense". William and Mary Quarterly. 57 (3): 465–504. doi:10.2307/2674263. JSTOR 2674263.
- Fitzsimons, David (2008). "Paine, Thomas (1737–1809)". In Hamowy, Ronald (ed.). The Encyclopedia of Libertarianism. Thousand Oaks, CA: SAGE, Cato Institute. pp. 369–370. doi:10.4135/9781412965811.n226. ISBN 978-1412965804. LCCN 2008009151. OCLC 750831024. Archived from the original on February 21, 2022.
- Foner, Eric (1976). Tom Paine and Revolutionary America. Oxford University Press.
- Foner, Eric (2000). Thomas Paine. American National Biography Online. Archived from the original on September 18, 2019.
- Rush, Benjamin (2019). Butterfield, Lyman Henry (ed.). Letters of Benjamin Rush. Vol. II. Princeton University Press. ISBN 978-0691655918. Archived from the original on December 30, 2023.
- Greene, Jack P. "Paine, America, and the 'Modernization' Of Political Consciousness", Political Science Quarterly 93#1 (1978) pp. 73–92 Online Archived December 2, 2018, at the Wayback Machine.
- Griffiths, Trevor (2005). These Are the Times: A Life of Thomas Paine. Spokesman Books.
- Hawke, David Freeman (1974). Paine. New York: Harper & Row.
- Hitchens, Christopher (2007). Thomas Paine's Rights of Man: A Biography. London: Atlantic Books. ISBN 978-1843546283.
- Kates, Gary (1989). "From Liberalism to Radicalism: Tom Paine's Rights of Man". Journal of the History of Ideas. 50 (4): 569–587. doi:10.2307/2709798. JSTOR 2709798.
- Kaye, Harvey J. (2005). Thomas Paine and the Promise of America. New York City: Hill & Wang.
- Keane, John (1995). Tom Paine: A Political Life. London: Bloomsbury.
- Lamb, Robert (2010). "Liberty, Equality, and the Boundaries of Ownership: Thomas Paine's Theory of Property Rights". Review of Politics. 72 (3): 483–511. doi:10.1017/S0034670510000331. hdl:10871/9896. S2CID 55413082.
- Larkin, Edward (2005). Thomas Paine and the Literature of Revolution. Cambridge University Press.
- Lessay, Jean (1987). L'américain de la Convention, Thomas Paine: Professeur de révolutions [The National Convention's American, Thomas Paine, professor of revolution] (in French). Paris: Éditions Perrin. p. 241.
- Levin, Yuval (2013). The Great Debate: Edmund Burke, Thomas Paine, and the Birth of Right and Left. Basic Books. ISBN 978-0465062980.
- Lewis, Joseph L. (1947). Thomas Paine: The Author of the Declaration of Independence. New York: Freethought Press Association.
- Nelson, Craig (2006). Thomas Paine: Enlightenment, Revolution, and the Birth of Modern Nations. Viking. ISBN 978-0670037889.
- Phillips, Mark (May 2008). "Paine, Thomas (1737–1809)". Oxford Dictionary of National Biography (online ed.). Oxford University Press. doi:10.1093/ref:odnb/21133. (Subscription, Wikipedia Library access or UK public library membership required.)
- Powell, David (1985). Tom Paine, The Greatest Exile. Hutchinson. ISBN 978-0367271343.
- Russell, Bertrand (1934). "The Fate of Thomas Paine". Thomas Paine National Historical Association. Archived from the original on February 21, 2022.
- Solinger, Jason D. (November 2010). "Thomas Paine's Continental Mind". Early American Literature. 45 (3): 593–617. doi:10.1353/eal.2010.0029. S2CID 161742555.
- Vincent, Bernard (2005). The Transatlantic Republican: Thomas Paine and the age of revolutions. Rodopi. ISBN 978-9042016149. Archived from the original on February 4, 2021.
- Wilensky, Mark (2008). The Elementary Common Sense of Thomas Paine. An Interactive Adaptation for All Ages. Casemate. ISBN 978-1932714364.
- Washburne, E. B. (May 1880). "Thomas Paine and the French Revolution". Scribner's Monthly. XX.

=== Primary sources ===
- Paine, Thomas (1896). Conway, Moncure Daniel (ed.). The Writings of Thomas Paine, Volume 4. New York: G. P. Putnam's sons. p. 521. E'book
- Foot, Michael; Kramnick, Isaac (1987). The Thomas Paine Reader. Penguin Classics. ISBN 978-0140444964.
- Paine, Thomas (1993). Foner, Eric (ed.). Writings. Philadelphia: Library of America.. Authoritative and scholarly edition containing Common Sense, the essays comprising the American Crisis series, Rights of Man, The Age of Reason, Agrarian Justice, and selected briefer writings, with authoritative texts and careful annotation.
- Paine, Thomas (1944). Foner, Philip S. (ed.). The Complete Writings of Thomas Paine. Citadel Press. A complete edition of Paine's writings, on the model of Eric Foner's edition for the Library of America, is badly needed. Until then Philip Foner's two-volume edition is a serviceable substitute. Volume I contains the major works, and volume II contains shorter writings, both published essays and a selection of letters, but confusingly organized; in addition, Foner's attributions of writings to Paine have come in for some criticism in that Foner may have included writings that Paine edited but did not write and omitted some writings that later scholars have attributed to Paine.
- Thomas Clio Rickman (1819) The Life of Thomas Paine via Internet Archive

=== Fiction ===
- Fast, Howard (1946). Citizen Tom Paine. (historical novel, though sometimes mistaken as biography).
