= Laurent Dabos =

French painter (1761–1835)

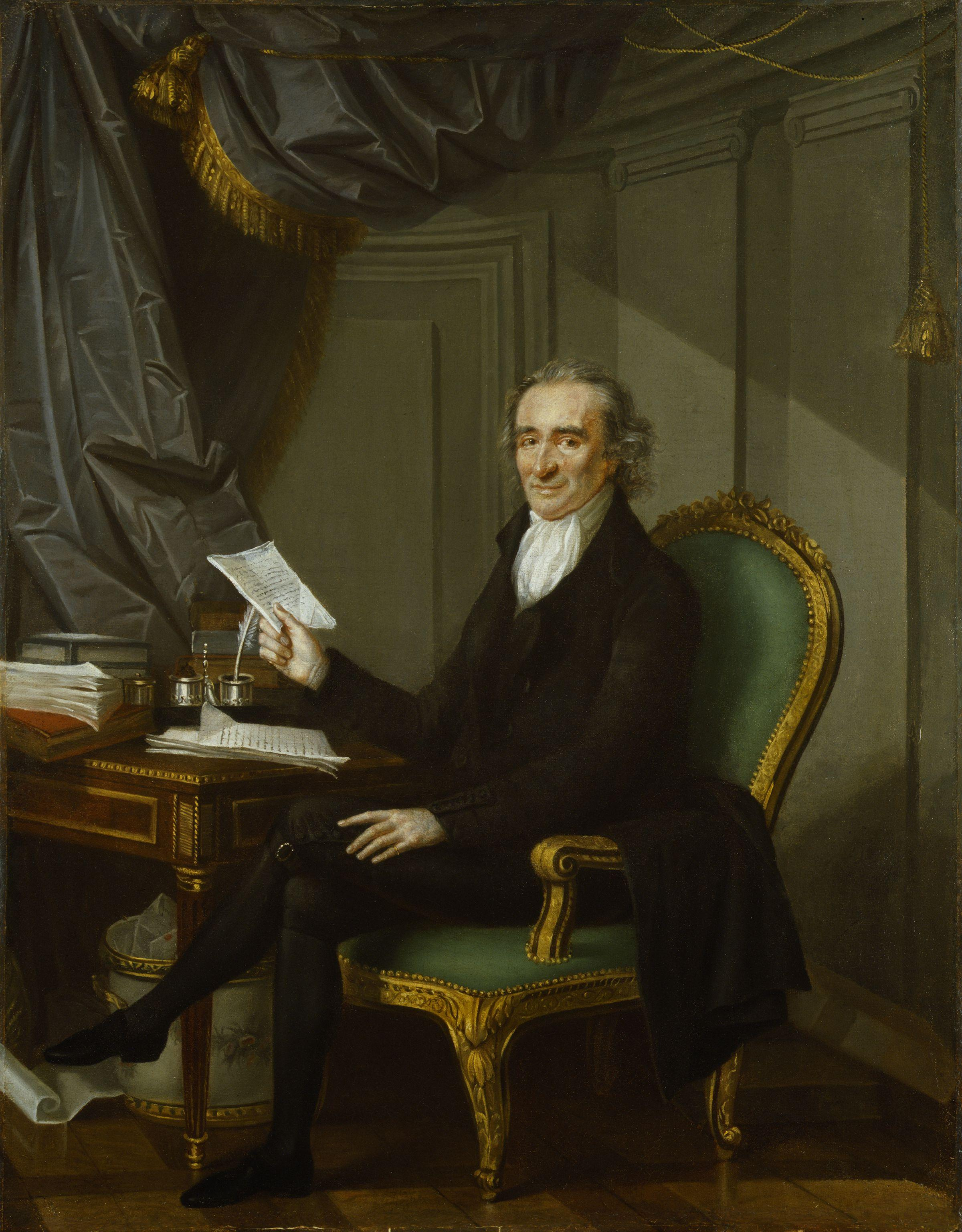
Thomas Paine, portrait from circa 1791, now at the National Portrait Gallery

Laurent Dabos (1761–1835) was a French painter of portraits and of historical and genre subjects.

He studied with François André Vincent, and first exhibited at the "Exposition de la Jeunesse" in 1788. His works included Mary of England, Queen of France, lamenting the death of her husband, Louis XII, The Return of the Grande Armée, and Louis XVI. writing his Will, a picture painted in the Temple during the captivity of the royal family. Besides these he painted from life the portrait of the Dauphin (Louis XVII). He died in Paris in 1835. His wife, Jeanne Bernard, who was a pupil of Madame Guyard, also painted genre subjects. She was born at Lunéville in 1763, and died in 1842.
