= Jeanne Bernard Dabos =

French artist (1765–1842)

Jeanne Bernard Dabos (1765–1842) was a French miniature painter.

Born in Lunéville, Dabos was the daughter of calligrapher Jean-Joseph Bernard, and studied with Adélaïde Labille-Guiard. A 1787 letter to the Mercure indicates that she submitted two drawings and one pastel to that year's Exposition de la Jeunesse; no further activity as a pastellist is recorded. In 1789 she exhibited miniatures at the salon in Toulouse, and she showed at the Paris Salon in 1791 and from 1802 until 1835. She was influenced to attempt genre painting by her husband, Laurent Dabos. Antoine Phelippeaux produced an engraving after her portrait of Marie Antoinette. Jeanne Dubois died in Paris.
