= Thomas "Clio" Rickman =

English Quaker and publisher of political pamphlets (1760–1834)

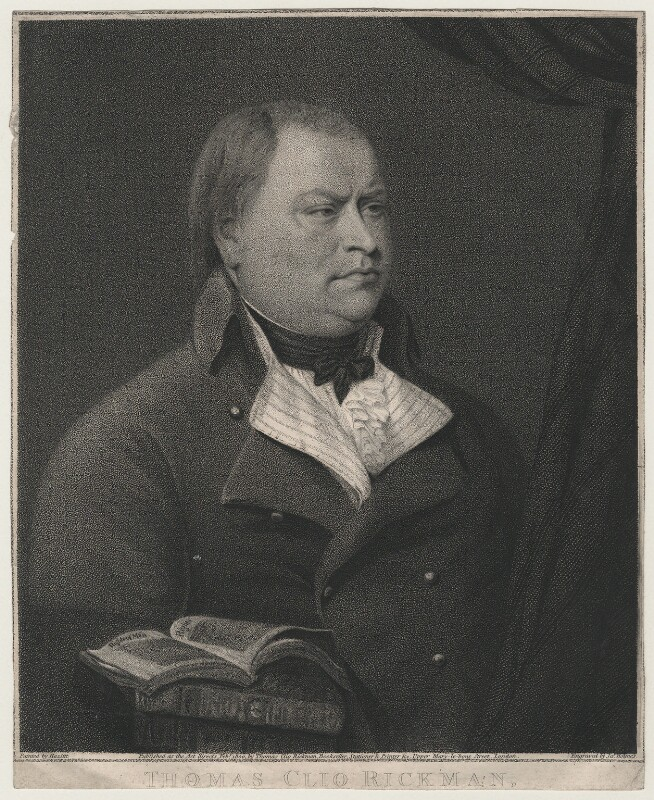
Engraving of Rickman, 1800

Thomas "Clio" Rickman (1761–1834) was an English Quaker publisher of political pamphlets.

He was born into a Quaker family, the youngest son of John Rickman (1715–1789), a brewer and the freeholder of the Bear Inn at Cliffe, near (now in) Lewes, Sussex), and Elizabeth Rickman (née Peters). He published political pamphlets and broadsides, contributing to the poetry columns of the Black Dwarf and other periodicals.

Rickman married outside the Quaker faith, and after being disowned by the Society of Friends moved to London, where in 1783 he set up as a bookseller. He was a member of the Headstrong Club, and a friend of Thomas Paine, who lived with him when composing The Rights of Man in 1791 - they had first met during the time Paine was living in Lewes between 1768 and 1774. His Life of Thomas Paine was published in 1819.

== See also ==
- Early American publishers and printers
- Robert Bell (publisher) Thomas Paine's publisher
