= Society of the Friends of Truth =

French revolutionary organization (f. 1790)

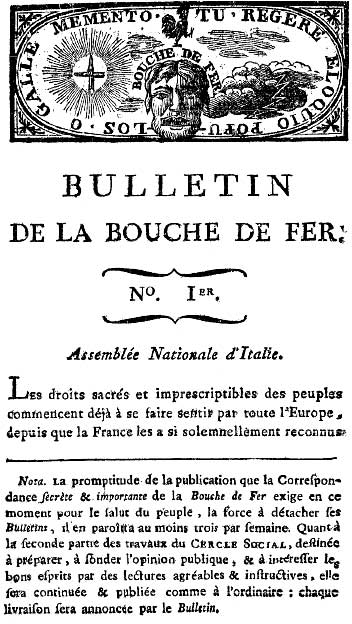
First issue of La Bouche de fer (Mouth of Iron)

The Society of the Friends of Truth (French: Amis de la Verité), also known as the Social Club (French: Cercle social), was a French revolutionary organization founded in 1790. It was "a mixture of revolutionary political club, the Masonic Lodge, and a literary salon". It also published an influential revolutionary newspaper, the Mouth of Iron.

== The inception ==
The Society of the Friends of Truth was established in early 1790 by Nicholas Bonneville, Claude Fauchet along with Condorcet and Lanthenas. The original purpose of the club was to become a "clearing-house" for correspondence between and among scholars from all over Europe. In the spirit of its founders, the club wished to cultivate a "public mandate" under which its activities would be governed. Thus, its newsletter, Mouth of Iron (La Bouche de fer), solicited letters from readers to comment on political affairs and to issue denunciations of counter-revolutionary plots.

The club was actually launched in the month of October 1790, when the sessions "of the Universal Confederation of the Friends of Truth" at the Cirque du Palais-Royal started. Before an audience that ranged from five thousand to eight thousand people every week, Claude Fauchet, self-appointed "attorney of Truth", lectured on Jean-Jacques Rousseau's 1762 work The Social Contract. The club also formulated political theories on democratic government, ultimately dismissing direct democracy in favor of a system that resembled a popularly elected dictatorship that could be dismissed by the citizens whenever its actions became insupportable. The Social Club also advocated steps toward a more equitable distribution of wealth, always with an eye to Rousseau's ideals, but the club did not support land reform.

The meetings were described in detail in the "Mouth of Iron", which published the proceedings of the Fauchet lectures and discussions and the mail that arrived following them. This publication is important for understanding the genesis of democratic ideas during the French Revolution. The Social Club was also the first revolutionary group to identify itself clearly as a cosmopolitan organization, meaning that its aims superseded national boundaries. It made appeals to scholars worldwide, and it produced a polyglot edition of the 1791 Constitution for distribution globally. Its goal was to create a universal republic led by scholars.

== Membership and adherents ==
Key figures attending the Social Club included Nicholas Bonneville and Claude Fauchet, as well as Sylvain Maréchal, "Gracchus" Babeuf, Goupil de Préfeln, Camille Desmoulins, Bertrand Barère, and the Marquis de Condorcet. About one-hundred-thirty persons were members and attended meetings regularly.

The meetings were public because the club wanted to show the widest possible audience what discourse in the atmosphere of a literary or philosophical salon might accomplish. (This explains the choice of the Cirque du Palais-Royal as a meeting-place, rather than some smaller venue like a private home.) Spectators were invited to ask questions, and a resolution was passed at the end of each session.

In 1791, the membership of the Social Club openly declared themselves republicans. It then became a meeting place for the Girondists, who would rival more radical Jacobin factions for primacy of republican ideology and action. The club's political orientation was liberal, and it promoted the ideal of a society composed of small and medium economic producers: craftsmen, farmers, merchants, and entrepreneurs.

The members of the Social Club also considered themselves contemporary feminists, and while no remarkable feminist change would come out of the club, the members of the club helped individually to develop the framework for what would become the Declaration of the Rights of Woman and of the Female Citizen. Olympe de Gouges, the author of the Declaration of the Rights of Woman, was a member of the club and would often develop her ideas through the liberal conduit of the Social Club. While the members did proclaim themselves supporters of republican ideals publicly, their embrace of feminist ideals was regarded as much more treasonous (and as such, was quite under wraps).

From 1791 on, the club's offices operated a publishing business. It became a center for the dissemination of revolutionary literature, including numerous newspapers, political pamphlets, theatrical works, poetry, posters, etc. A number of seminal authors, Louis-Sébastien Mercier, Nicolas-Edme Rétif de la Bretonne, Bernardin de Saint-Pierre, Jean-Baptiste Lamarck, Condorcet, Jacques Pierre Brissot, John Skey Eustace and Jean-Marie Roland, were published under the club's auspices.

After the fall of the Girondins, the club dissolved. Fauchet was arrested and executed on 31 October 1793. Bonneville, the printer, resumed activity after 9 Thermidor (27 July 1794). His press tried to resurrect the Social Club, but it never regained its previous audience. In a fragmented state, it continued to exist until Brumaire of year VIII (November 1800). By then, ideologues like Daunou, Volney, Daubenton, and Berthollet held center stage.

The Amis de la Verité was fondly remembered, and it became a touchstone for the romantics of the nineteenth century, like Charles Nodier and Victor Hugo, but it was also highly esteemed among politicians and social theorists such as Charles Fourier, Saint-Simon, and Karl Marx.

The revolutionary movement which began in 1789 in the Cercle Social, which in the middle of its course had as its chief representatives Leclerc and Roux, and which finally with Babeuf’s conspiracy was temporarily defeated, gave rise to the communist idea which Babeuf’s friend Buonarroti re-introduced in France after the Revolution of 1830. This idea, consistently developed, is the idea of the new world order. — Karl Marx, The Holy Family (German: Die heilige Familie).

== The Mouth of Iron ==
La Bouche de fer, the Mouth of Iron, may have derived its name, sardonically, from Lucius Licinius Crassus's observation about the consul, Domitius, "that it was no wonder that a man who had a beard of brass, also had a mouth of iron and a heart of lead." Others hold that the name comes from a mailbox in the shape of a lion's mouth, located at the headquarters of the club, at No. 4, rue du Théâtre-Français, where letters, petitions, proposals, denunciations, screeds, and other treatises could be deposited. A third theory is that this name, Mouth of Iron, was the same name as a lodge of freemasons to which Bonneville and Fauchet had once belonged.

In any case, the Mouth of Iron was published in Paris between October 1790 and 28 July 1791, at first, three times per week, then daily, beginning on 22 June 1791. The newsletter contained comments on "The Social Contract" of Jean-Jacques Rousseau, essays by Claude Fauchet, transcripts of speeches by Condorcet, petitions from the Club of the Cordeliers, etc. A subscription cost thirty-six pounds (livres) per year, and anyone who subscribed was automatically made a member of the Social Club; so, since casual readers and curiosity-seekers were counted as members, the size of the club's membership was probably somewhat overstated.

La Bouche de fer was the origin of the famous quote, often attributed to Denis Diderot: "Quand le dernier des rois sera pendu avec les boyaux du dernier prêtre célibataire, le genre humain pourra espérer être heureux." ("When the last king is hanged with the entrails of the last celibate priest, mankind may hope to be happy.")

== See also ==
- Girondins
- Pierre-Daniel Martin-Maillefer

== Bibliography ==
- Albert Soboul, Historical Dictionary of the French Revolution, PUF, 1989.
- M. Dorigny, "The Social Club: Egalitarianism and liberalism at the beginning of the Revolution: The impossible compromise", Proceedings of the Symposium on MRI, 1987.
- Gary Kates, The Cercle Social, the Girondins and the French Revolution, Princeton University Press, 1985.
