= Nicholas Bonneville =

French bookseller, printer, journalist, and writer (1760–1828)

Nicholas Bonneville (French pronunciation: [nikɔla bɔnvil]; born Nicolas de Bonneville; 13 March 1760 – 9 November 1828) was a French bookseller, printer, journalist, and writer. He was also a political figure of some relevance at the time of the French Revolution and into the early years of the next century.

== Youth ==
De Bonneville was born at Évreux in Upper Normandy. A son of the prosecutor, Jean-Pierre Bonneville, Nicolas de Bonneville was expelled from the university during the first year of his philosophy studies after he created a scandal by refusing to support his contention that Jean-Jacques Rousseau was an atheist. Before taking up philosophy, he began, like his compatriot, Pierre-Louis Siret, as a student of languages with an interest in philology. He was also a follower, though without sharing all of his ideas, of Jacques Le Brigant. As a young man, he produced German and English translations of the works of Jean le Rond d'Alembert, which financially supported him until his death. In particular, he was known for reproducing the essay on the origins of freemasonry by Thomas Paine, who became his close friend.

== Freemasonry ==
Initiated into freemasonry in 1786 during a stay in England, he wrote two books on the subject, the "Jesuits Expelled from Masonry", and "Dagger Shattered by the Masons", both in 1788, in which he accuses the Jesuits of having introduced into the symbolic degrees of freemasonry, the myths of the Templars and their doctrine of revenge, based on the "crime" of their destruction, and the four vows of the Templars included in their higher degrees. Earlier, in 1787, the leading Bavarian illuminist and freemason, Johann Joachim Christoph Bode, is said to have converted the German-speaking Bonneville to a faith that combined esoteric symbolism with radical ideas of popular sovereignty bordering on direct democracy.

== Politics ==
On the eve of the Convention of the Estates General, he began a passionate career in politics by publishing a newspaper, The Tribune of the People. Its proposals included the creation of a militia.

During the Revolution, he was among the first to propose the storming of the Bastille. Once the prison had fallen, the first mayor of Paris, Jean Sylvain Bailly, praised his "zealous and courageous" though "imprudent" initiatives, and he commissioned him as a lieutenant colonel in the militia, with the task of overseeing the water supply of the city of Paris. Soon afterward, he became president of the District of the Carmes Déchaussés, much to the fury of Jean-Paul Marat who had held that position.

== Society of the Friends of Truth ==
On 13 October 1790, he founded, with Claude Fauchet, the Society of the Friends of Truth (also known as the Amis de la Verité or the Social Club), whose purpose was to rally the human race to "the doctrine of love, which is the religion of happiness." The club became a forum for revolutionary and egalitarian ideas, attracting Sylvain Maréchal and Gracchus Babeuf into his circle. It was at the time unique for its focus on social, sexual and racial equality.

The reports of the Social Club were published in the newspaper, Mouth of Iron. He also published newspapers called The Tribune of the People, The Chronicle of the Month, and The Well Informed. In addition to Fauchet, de Bonneville's collaborators included Louis-Sébastien Mercier, Nicolas de Condorcet, Nicolas-Edme Rétif, and Thomas Paine.

== Political and philosophical beliefs ==
In a famous letter, Nicolas de Bonneville demanded freedom of the press, the abolition of Catholic worship, and the communal ownership of land.

In 1791, he founded the "Republican Society", whose members included Nicolas de Condorcet and Manon Roland. He was also friend and disciple to the occultist, Louis-Claude de Saint-Martin.

In his book "The Spirit of Religions", published in 1791, he sought to resolve the issue of social happiness by describing a universal religion which would have philosophers and scholars for priests. Following a disagreement with the Abbe Fauchet, he found himself alone at the Mouth of Iron. Nonetheless, the newspaper became one of the most sophisticated instruments of the Cordeliers Club, and it remained so until the cessation of its publication in the aftermath of the massacre on the Champ de Mars, 17 July 1791.

Bonneville's attempts to be elected to the National Assembly and the Convention failed. Hostile to the wantonly bloody violence of the Revolution, his denunciation of the massacres of September 1792 in "The Chronicle of the Month", earned him the wrath of Marat, who denounced him as an aristocrat. Soon afterward, he was arrested, but he was not executed; instead, he was released after the fall of Maximilien Robespierre.

== Retrenchment ==
Retiring for some time to Évreux in 1800, Thomas Paine, who had lived with him and his wife since 1797, helped with the burden of translating the "Covenant Sea". The advent of Napoleon plunged him into trouble again when he hid the royalist, Antoine Joseph Barruel-Beauvert, at his home, and employed him as a proofreader. Beauvert had been proscribed following the coup of 18 Fructidor (4 September 1797). Bonneville's generous act, earning him a portrayal by Charles Nodier as "a frequent host of all the unfortunate of all parties", aroused the suspicions of authorities.

He was later jailed for comparing Napoleon Bonaparte to Oliver Cromwell, in The Well Informed of 19 Brumaire Year VIII (November 1800), and, although he was freed quickly enough, he found his presses had been confiscated. Ruined, he took refuge with his father in Évreux, and he remained under police surveillance.

In 1802, Tom Paine left for the United States with Bonneville's wife, Marguerite Brazier (1767–1846), who was a disciple of Bonneville's associate, the radical feminist, Etta Palm d'Aelders, and Brazier's three sons, Benjamin, Louis, and Thomas, of whom Paine was godfather. They settled in New Rochelle, New York on Paine's farm. In his will, Paine left the bulk of his estate to Marguerite who had cared for him until he died in 1809. The inheritance included one hundred acres (40 ha) of his New Rochelle farm where they had been living, so she could maintain and educate her sons.

The fall of Napoleon in 1814 finally allowed Bonneville to rejoin his wife in New Rochelle, where he remained for four years before returning to Paris. There, he earned a living by opening a bookshop in the Latin Quarter. During the latter years of his life, he fell into misery and madness, naturally taking a more pessimistic view on the possibilities for the happiness of mankind. Bonneville died in 1828 in Paris at the age of 68. His funeral expenses were paid for by Charles Nodier, Victor Hugo, and Alfred de Vigny.

His son, Benjamin Bonneville, undertook a career in the U.S. Army in which he retired as a brigadier general; his life was immortalized by Washington Irving's "Adventures of Captain Bonneville".

Bonneville played a crucial role in the advent of Romanticism. His own writings and inspirations make him an essential precursor of this literary movement. His translations from German of Goethe, Lessing, and Schiller also laid the groundwork for later French poets would wished to become familiar with the German stage.

== Bibliography ==
- La poésies de Nicolas Bonneville, Paris, Imprimerie du Cercle social, 1793
- De l'esprit des religions. Ouvrage promis et nécessaire à la Confédération universelle des amis de la vérité, Paris, Impr. du Cercle social, 1792
- Histoire de l'Europe moderne. Depuis l'irruption des peuples du Nord dans l'empire Romain, jusqu'à la paix de 1783, 3 vol. Paris; Genève, [s.n.], 1789–1792
- La maçonnerie écossaise, Nîmes : C. Lacour, 1788
- Le Tribun du peuple, ou, Recueil des lettres de quelques électeurs de Paris avant la Révolution de 1789, Paris, Impr. du Cercle social, 1789
- Le Vieux tribun du peuple, Paris, Imprimerie du Cercle Social, 1793
- Les Jésuites chassés de la maçonnerie, et leur poignard brisé par les maçons, Paris, C. Volland, 1788
- Lettre de Nicolas de Bonneville, avocat au Parlement de Paris, à Mr. le Marquis de Condorcet, Londres : J. Rovinson, 1787
- L'hymne des combats. Hommage aux armées de la république, Paris, Imprimerie-Librairie du Cercle social, 1797
- Nicolas Bonneville, électeur du département de Paris aux véritables amis de la liberté, Paris, Impr. du Cercle social, 1791

== Sources ==
- Jean-Francois Bailly, Memoires, Paris, Paris, Baldwin Brothers, 1821, t. II, p. 334
- Francois Furet, Nicolas de Bonneville and the Social Circle, 1787–1800, Paris, Hachette, 1976
- Philippe Le Harivel. Nicolas de Bonneville, pre-Romantic and Revolutionary, 1760–1828, Strasbourg, Librairie Istra; London, New York: H. Milford, Oxford University Press, 1923
- Simon Linguet, Memoirs of the Bastille, Paris, Librairie des Bibliophiles, 1889
- Jules Michelet, History of the French Revolution, Paris, A. Lacroix, 1877–1879, t. II, pp. 230–232.
- James H Billington, Fire in the Minds of Men, Origins of the Revolutionary Faith, Transaction Publishers, New Brunswick, London, 1999.

== Translations ==
- The Poetry of Nicolas Bonneville, Paris, Imprimerie du Cercle Social, 1976, 1793
- In the Spirit of Religion: book promised and necessary to the Federal Universal Friends of Truth, Paris, Impr. Social Circle, 1792
- History of Modern Europe: From the Invasion of Northern Peoples in the Roman Empire until the Peace of 1783, 3 vols. Paris, Geneva, [sn], 1789–1792
- Scottish Masonry, Nîmes: C. Lacour, 1788, 1998
- The Tribune of the People, or, Collection of letters from some voters in Paris before the Revolution of 1789 Paris, Impr. Social Circle, 1789
- The Old People's Tribune, Paris, Imprimerie du Cercle Social, 1793
- Jesuits Expelled from Masonry, and Dagger Shattered by the Masons, Paris, C. Volland, 1788
- "Letter from Nicolas de Bonneville, a lawyer at the Parliament of Paris, M. le Marquis de Condorcet", London: J. Rovinson, 1976, 1787
- The Anthem of Fighting: a Tribute to the Armies of the Republic, Paris, Librairie-Imprimerie du Cercle Social, 1976, 1797
- Nicolas Bonneville, Elector of the Department of Paris to the Real Friends of Freedom, Paris, Impr. Social Circle, 1976, 1791
