= Aldridge (surname) =

Aldridge is an English surname derived from a toponym. Notable people with the surname include:

- A. Owen Aldridge (1915–2005), American expert in colonial literary studies
- Alan Aldridge (1938–2017), English artist
- Albert Aldridge (1864–1891), English footballer
- Alexandra Aldridge (born 1994), American ice dancer
- Allen Aldridge Sr. (1944–2015), American football defensive end
- Allen Aldridge Jr. (1972–2024), American football linebacker
- Amanda Aldridge (1866–1956), English composer
- Blake Aldridge (born 1982), British synchronized diver
- Brian Aldridge (disambiguation), multiple people, including
  - Brian Aldridge (umpire) (1940–2021), New Zealand cricketer and umpire
  - Brian Aldridge (politician) (born 1977), American politician in Mississippi
- Charles Aldridge (born 1947), New Zealand cricketer
- Chris Aldridge, BBC announcer
- Cory Aldridge (born 1979), American baseball player
- Dan Aldridge (born 1984), British politician
- David Aldridge (born 1965), American sports analyst
- Edward C. Aldridge Jr. (born 1938), United States Secretary of the Air Force
- Ellie Aldridge (born 1996), British sailor
- Eileen Aldridge (1916–1990), English artist
- George Aldridge (disambiguation), multiple people, including:
  - George Aldridge (boxer) (born 1936), British middleweight boxer
  - George Sydney Aldridge (1847–1911), Australian businessman, president of the Adelaide Stock Exchange
  - George Washington Aldridge Sr. (1833–1877), New York politician
- Gerard Aldridge (born 1958), Canadian politician from Saskatchewan
- Graeme Aldridge (born 1977), New Zealand cricketer
- Henry Aldridge (1923–2002), North Carolina politician
- Ira Aldridge (1807–1867), American stage actor
- James Aldridge (1918–2015), Australian war correspondent and writer
- James Henry Aldridge (1849–1929) Australian horse breeder and hotelier
- Jerry Aldridge (born 1956), American football player
- John Aldridge (disambiguation), multiple people, including:
  - John Aldridge (born 1958), Irish football (soccer) striker
  - John Aldridge (artist) (1905–1983), English painter and Associate of the Royal Academy
  - John Aldridge (cricketer) (born 1935), English cricketer
  - John Aldridge (RAF officer) (1899–1988), World War I flying ace
  - John E. Aldridge American Politician
  - John W. Aldridge (1922–2007), American writer, literary critic, teacher and scholar
- Karen Aldridge, American actress
- Kay Aldridge (1917–1995), American actress and model
- Keith Aldridge (born 1973), American ice hockey defenseman
- Kevin Aldridge (born 1980), American football player
- Kitty Aldridge, British actress and writer
- LaMarcus Aldridge (born 1985), American basketball player
- Lily Aldridge (born 1985), American fashion model
- Lionel Aldridge (1941–1998), American football player
- M. Dayne Aldridge, American engineer
- Martin Aldridge (footballer) (1974–2000), English footballer
- Martin Aldridge (politician) (born 1982), Australian politician
- Melvin Aldridge (born 1970), American football player
- Michael Aldridge (1920–1994), British actor
- Michael Aldridge (rugby union) (born 1983), Australian rugby union player
- Olive M. Aldridge (1866–1950), English nurse and social reformer
- Paul Aldridge (born 1981), English footballer
- Peyton Aldridge (born 1995), American basketball player
- Rasheen Aldridge Jr. (born 1994), American activist and politician
- Richard Aldridge (1945–2014), British palaeontologist
- Robert Aldridge (disambiguation), multiple people
- Rod Aldridge, British businessman and politician
- Ruby Aldridge (born 1991), American model
- Sarah Aldridge (1911–2006), Brazil-born lesbian author
- Seamus Aldridge (born 1935), Irish Gaelic games administrator and referee
- Tommy Aldridge (born 1950), American drummer
- Vic Aldridge (1893–1973), American baseball player
- Walt Aldridge (1955–2025), American musician, singer, songwriter, engineer and record producer
- William Aldridge (1737–1797), English nonconformist minister

Fictional Characters

- Ephraim "Atticus" Aldridge, a character in the TV series Downton Abbey
- Jennifer Aldridge, a character in UK radio series The Archers
- Brian, Debbie and Phoebe Aldridge, characters in The Archers

== See also ==
- Aldredge, surname
- Alridge, surname
