= John Aldridge (disambiguation) =

John Aldridge (born 1958) is a former Republic of Ireland international footballer and football manager.

John Aldridge may also refer to:

- John Aldridge (cricketer) (born 1935), English cricketer
- John Aldridge (RAF officer) (1899–1988), World War I flying ace
- John Aldridge (artist) (1905–1983), British oil painter, draftsmen, wallpaper designer, and art teacher
- John Aldridge (British politician) (1832–1888), British Conservative Party politician
- John Clater Aldridge, Storekeeper of the Ordnance and Member of Parliament
- John W. Aldridge (1922–2007), American writer, literary critic, teacher and scholar
- John Mullings Aldridge (1843–1920), Anglican priest
- John Aldridge (physician) (1926–2023), English consultant
