= Robert Bell (publisher) =

American printer and publisher

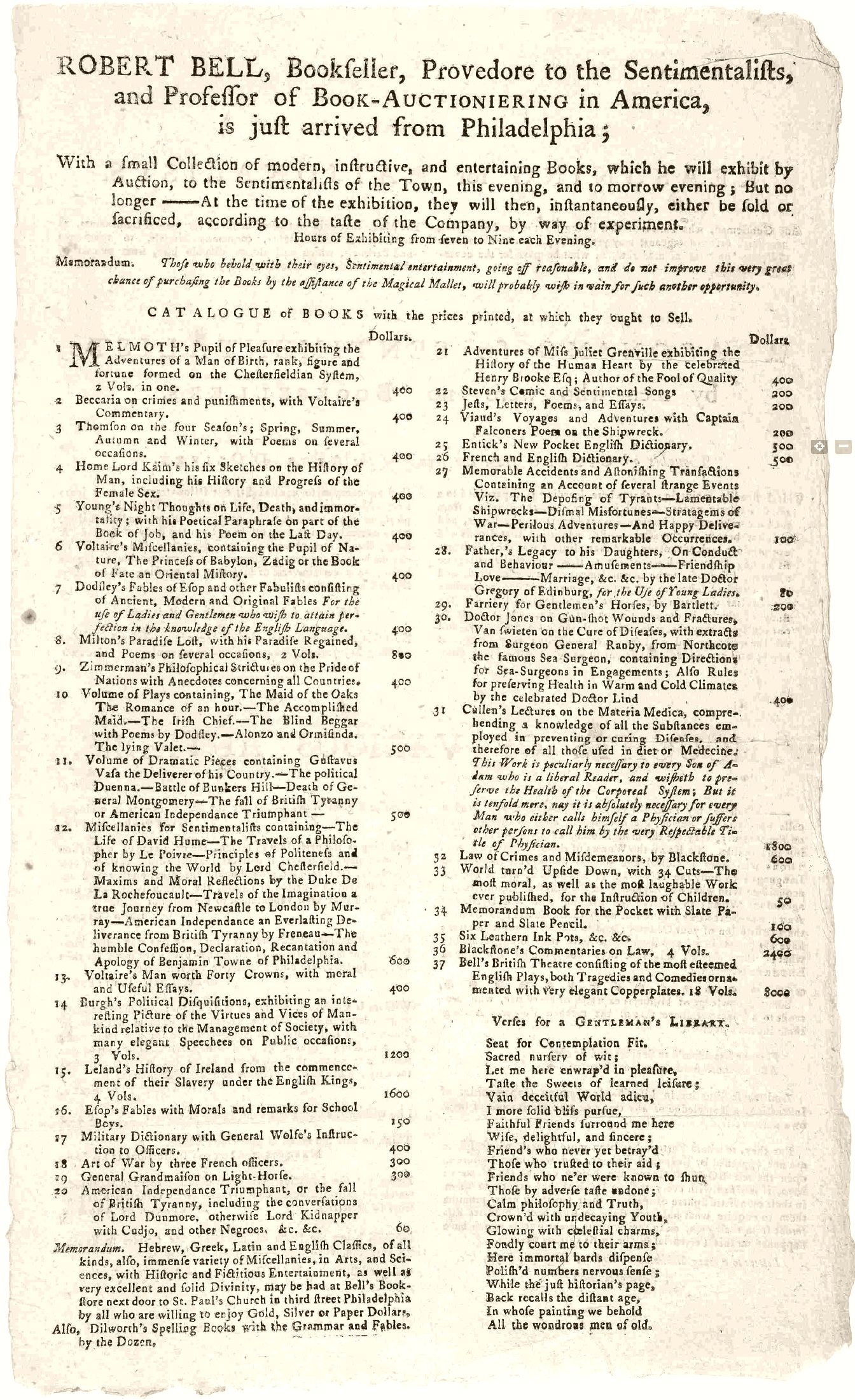
Auction house listing of rare books sold by Robert Bell, 1780

Robert Bell (1732–1784) was a Scottish immigrant to the British colonies in America and became one of many early American printers and publishers active during the years leading up to and through the American Revolution. Bell became widely noted for printing Thomas Paine's celebrated work, Common Sense, a highly influential work during the revolution that openly criticized the British Parliament and their management and taxation of the British-American colonies. Bell and Paine later had a falling out over profits and publication issues. As a dedicated patriot, Bell printed many pamphlets and books before and during the revolution, many of which "glowingly" expressed his patriotic views. He also reprinted a number of popular English works, presenting them to the colonies for the first time. He ran an auction house which sold rare books in Lancaster, and in later life he toured the colonies selling off his massive book collection. After Bell's death, his printing press and other items were sold at a Philadelphia auction house to another prominent printer at an unusually high price.

== Early life and family ==
Robert Bell was born in Glasgow, Scotland, and was of the Quaker persuasion. Growing up in Scotland he was taught the book-binding trade. He traveled to Berwick-upon-Tweed, and continued in that trade for sometime. From there he moved to Dublin and became a bookseller, which at first seemed promising but after a few years the enterprise failed. He married in Dublin, and was for some time the partner of George Alexander Stevens, an English playwright and poet. Bell emigrated to the British colonies in 1767, and established himself as an auctioneer of books, where he soon became a full time bookseller in Philadelphia.

== Publisher ==
Bell arrived in Philadelphia from Dublin in 1767. (Note: Philadelphia historian John Thomas Scharf places the date of Bell's arrival in Philadelphia at 1766.) In 1769, or early in 1770, Bell established a printing press and shop in Philadelphia in a building which previously housed the Union Library, located next door to Saint Paul's Church, on Third street. He soon became known as an auctioneer of books, once referring to himself on record, 7 February 1774, as a "Professor of Book Auctioneering." Unlike many other printers, Bell did not own or work for any newspaper, had no government contracts and had to rely on his own prospects.

Bell was the first to present a number of popular English works from a wide selection in every class of literature current in England in simple affordable printing and binding. His successful practice of offering inexpensive editions soon compelled other printers to offer publications where the common citizen could thereby obtain works of literature they would otherwise be unable to afford. Bell biographer David Landis maintained in his 1908 essay that such a sales practice put Bell as a publisher way ahead of his time.

As a book seller one of Bell's earliest advertisements appeared in the 14 April 1768, issue of Benjamin Franklin's Pennsylvania Gazette. In July he advertised his first publications in the Pennsylvania Chronicle "which introduced to the people of this continent the first American edition of two works of those duo immortals and staunch friends": The History of Rasselas, Prince of Abissinia, written by Doctor Samuel Johnson in 1763, and The Traveller, written by Oliver Goldsmith in 1764: In 1772, Bell published Blackstone's Commentaries in four volumes, which saw a good subscription rate in Philadelphia. Prior to this he published William Robertson's biography of Emperor Charles the Fifth. These two works are considered Bell's first successful publications while in Philadelphia. He also published Sterne's Sentimental Journey, Robertson's History of Scotland in three volumes, Leland's History of Ireland in four volumes, Robinson Crusoe, Paradise Lost, along with, plays, poems, and novels innumerable.

There was a paper shortage in the American colonies in the several years leading up to the Revolutionary War, and grew more serious during that war as the demand for paper increased. Before 1765 most of the paper used by colonial printers and newspapers was imported, while the struggling colonial paper mills, mostly located in Pennsylvania, were not able to meet the demands of the many printers that emerged during the war. Bell worked with the public in an effort to collect rags used in the production of paper. Along with other printers, Bell printed advertisements in various Pennsylvania newspapers for the call and collection of rags used in paper manufacturing, along with essays on paper making and the materials used for its production. This was yet another effort that would bring the colonies together in a common cause.

=== American Revolution era ===
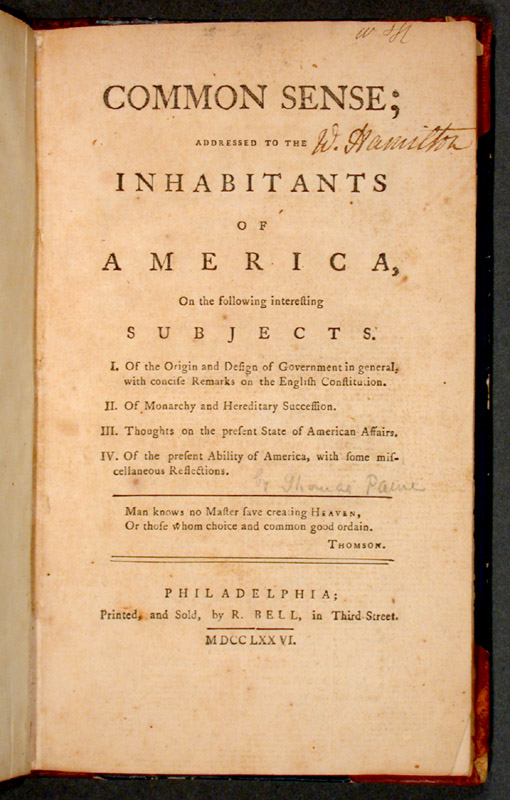
Title page of Thomas Paine's Common Sense, with "Printed, and Sold, by R. Bell" inscribed at bottom

In the years leading up to and through the American Revolution, Bell printed many pamphlets and books which ardently expressed his patriotic ideas and sentiments. As a printer in Philadelphia (Note: Philadelphia at this time was the leader in colonial politics as it concerned revolutionary thought, a booming mercantile city, and was at the center of colonial resistance to British rule over the colonies in the 1770s.) he worked tirelessly in that effort more than most printers. By 1776 he was especially busy when he printed a continuation of letters to the Legislature on American Independence. A second edition of "Plain Truth" was partly printed on coarse blue paper, which, as Bell stated, "constituted the law of necessity," and he added, further, "The Patriot surmounteth every difficulty," etc.

Bell was commissioned by Thomas Paine to print his work, Common Sense, which has been widely considered the most inciteful and influential work of the revolutionary era, (Note: Revolutionary icon Samuel Adams praised Paine's work: "Common Sense and The Crisis undoubtedly awakened the public mind, and led the people loudly to call for a declaration of independence.") as it advocated American independence, now ripe in the minds of colonists, and openly criticized the British Crown and Parliamentary rule over the colonies. Paine originally had intended for his work to be printed in the various colonial newspapers in a series of articles, but they were concerned that British colonial authorities very likely would threaten or confiscate their printing operations. (Note: Before the revolution more than 1200 colonial printers were prosecuted for sedition and libel for printing similar articles or literature.) On the recommendation of Benjamin Rush, who thought highly of Bell, referring to him as the "Republican printer", and thought him courageous enough to print what became a politically volatile work, (Note: In his autobiography Rush refers to Robert Bell as Thomas Bell. p. 85) Paine complied and turned over his manuscript to Bell. Paine made an agreement with him that if the publication should prove to be an unprofitable venture that he would cover any losses he incurred. To further make the prospect attractive, Paine agreed to give Bell half of any profits realized. The other half Paine intended to purchase wool mittens for the troops going to Quebec, giving a written order on Bell to two officers of the Continental Army. Bell at once set to printing the work with great enthusiasm, feeling just as strongly about the idea of independence as Paine. Bell set the price of the pamphlet at two shillings per copy. (Note: Between 120,000 and 150,000 copies of Common Sense were printed in the first year alone. It became the first American best-seller.) For fear of recrimination, Paine had the first edition of Common Sense published anonymously. At the time of its printing there was a serious paper shortage in the colonies, compounded by the revolution. Bell placed an advertisement in the 10 January 1776, issue of William Bradford's newspaper, The Pennsylvania Journal, following with one in The Pennsylvania Evening Post on 27 January, owned by Benjamin Towne. Common Sense was favorably received throughout the colonies and sold very quickly.

Paine's work received some criticism, most notably in a pamphlet by James Chalmers, writing under the assumed name of Candidus (Note: Samuel Adams frequently used this pen name in his articles also.) entitled The Plain Truth, also printed by Bell, which was not received well by a patriotic populace who drove Chalmers into exile. Bell also received heavy criticism for publishing Chalmers' work from patriots who assumed Bell was lending Chalmers support for appearing to oppose independence and the ideas set forth in Paine's work. In his own defense, in reference to Plain Truth, Bell inserted in another publication a vindication of the liberty of the press which he described as "Extracted from an Old Pamphlet, Published in the Year 1756, Entitled Plain Truth." The author of this "Old Pamphlet", like that of Chalmers named Plain Truth, was Benjamin Franklin. Bell used the words of Franklin, who, like Bell, was a strong proponent of independence and freedom of the press, in vindication of a pamphlet against these ideals.

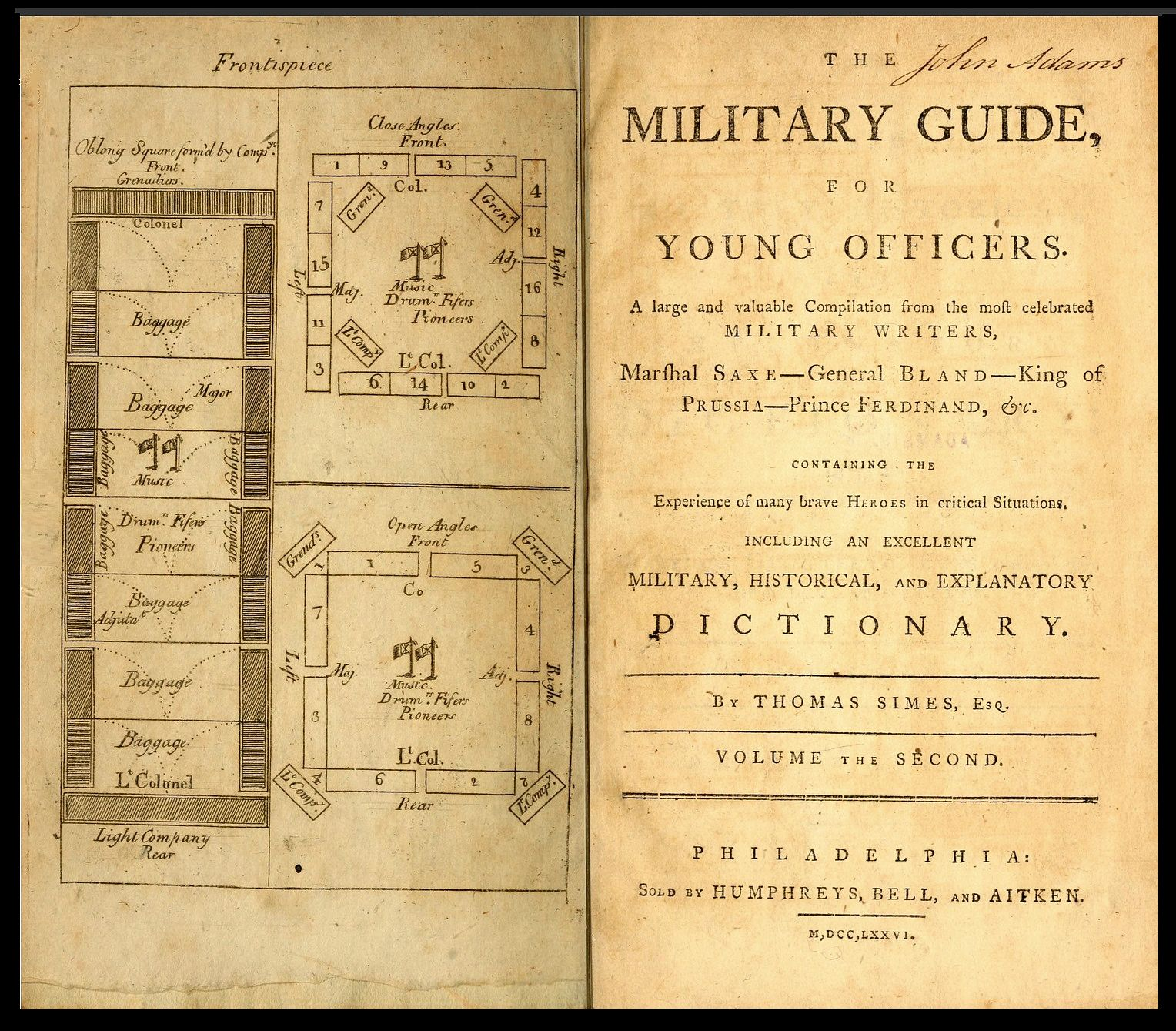
The Military Guide for Young officers, printed by Robert Bell, J. Humphreys, 1776 (this copy signed by John Adams)

Bell and Paine fell into disagreement about payment and publishing terms over Common Sense which began three weeks after the first advertisement of Paine's work appeared in the Pennsylvania Journal. Bell had claimed that he had not made any profit printing and publishing Common Sense and proceeded to publish an unauthorized edition. The disagreement grew into a controversy between the two which was covered in the local newspapers. Bell's second advertisement in the Evening Post included an attack on Paine's work, while Paine was still an anonymous figure. Paine responded by taking his business to Bell's competitor, the Bradford brothers, William and Thomas, who printed a third edition that included Paine's name on the cover, with a note appended declaring that Bell's second edition was unauthorized. The third edition became the standard text which became widely known to this day. It also contained an appendix, in which Paine included an “Epistle to the Quakers”. During the course of the sordid affair the attacks on the work and each other's character continued, mostly by Bell.

In 1776, Bell, James Humphreys and Robert Aitken together reprinted and published The Military Guide for Young Officers, a military, historical, and definitive dictionary which included passages from essays on the recruiting, arming, supplying, training and discipline of British infantry and cavalry.

== Later life ==
After the Revolutionary War Bell became an acclaimed book auctioneer whose name was recognized from Virginia to New Hampshire. As an auctioneer he sold most of his books, which he referred to as his "jewels and diamonds", in New York, Boston, Baltimore, Norfolk, among other towns. While on a book-selling trip to Richmond, Virginia, Bell became ill and died there on 16 or 23 September 1784; the accounts vary on the exact date.

Shortly after Bell's death, the contents of his shop, which included a printing press, office furniture, tools and books, were put up for auction. His books and other items sold for a few dollars, while the bidding for his printing press started with Mathew Carey for the modest amount of ten dollars. After fierce back and forth bidding between Carey and Colonel Eleazer Oswald, the editor of the Independent Gazette, Bell's press was finally awarded to Carey for one hundred and fifty dollars, the average price for a new press.

== See also ==
- Early American publishers and printers
- Benjamin Franklin
- William Goddard (publisher)
- List of early American publishers and printers

== Bibliography ==
- Adelman, Joseph M. (Fall 2013). "Trans-Atlantic Migration and the Printing Trade in Revolutionary America". Early American Studies. 11 (3). University of Pennsylvania Press: 516–544. doi:10.1353/eam.2013.0026. JSTOR 23547682. S2CID 144423922.
- Aldridge, Alfred Owen (1984). Thomas Paine's American ideology. Newark: University of Delaware Press. ISBN 978-0-8741-32601.
- Burgh, James (1775). "Political Disquisitions: or, An Enquiry into Public Errors, Defects, and Abuses" [Mainly treating of conditions in Great Britain]. HathiTrust Digital Library. Philadelphia, Pennsylvania (Third street and William Woodhouse in Front-street): Robert Bell. OCLC 55622433.
- Conway, Moncure Daniel; Cobbett, William (1892). The life of Thomas Paine. Vol. I. New York, London, G.P. Putnam's Sons.
- Conway, Moncure Daniel; Cobbett, William (1892). The life of Thomas Paine. Vol. II. New York, London, G.P. Putnam's Sons.
- Eldridge, Larry D. (July 1995). "Before Zenger: Truth and Seditious Speech in Colonial America, 1607–1700". The American Journal of Legal History. 39 (3). Oxford University Press: 337–358. doi:10.2307/845791. JSTOR 845791.
- Ferguson, Robert A. (July 2000). "The Commonalities of Common Sense". The William and Mary Quarterly. 57 (3). Omohundro Institute of Early American History and Culture: 465–504. doi:10.2307/2674263. JSTOR 2674263.
- Hildeburn, Charles Swift Riché (1885). A century of printing : the issues of the press in Pennsylvania, 1685-1784. Philadelphia: Press of Matlack & Harvey.
- Hindman, Jane F. (1960). Mathew Carey, pamphleteer for freedom. New York, P.J. Kenedy.
- Hosmer, James Kendall (1899). Samuel Adams. Boston New York, Houghton, Mifflin and company.
- Kaye, Harvey J. (2006). Thomas Paine and the promise of America. New York: Hill and Wang. ISBN 978-0-8090-93441.
- Landis, David Bachman (1908). Robert Bell, printer (PDF). Lancaster County Historical Society.
- Larkin, Edward (2005). Thomas Paine and the Literature of Revolution. Cambridge University Press. ISBN 978-1-1394-45986.
- Leonard, Eugenie Andruss (October 1950). "Paper as a Critical Commodity during the American Revolution". The Pennsylvania Magazine of History and Biography. 74 (4). University of Pennsylvania Press: 488–499. JSTOR 20088183.
- Parker, Peter J. (Spring 1966). "The Philadelphia Printer: A Study of an Eighteenth-Century Businessman". The Business History Review. 40 (1). The President and Fellows of Harvard College: 24–46. doi:10.2307/3112300. JSTOR 3112300. S2CID 156852880.
- Rush, Benjamin (2019). Butterfield, Lyman Henry (ed.). Letters of Benjamin Rush. Vol. II. Princeton University Press. ISBN 978-0-6916-55918.
- Saillant, John (2015). "Common Sense". The Encyclopedia of Greater Philadelphia.
- Scharf, John Thomas; Westcott, Thompson (1884). History of Philadelphia, 1609–1884. Vol. I. Philadelphia, L. H. Everts & co.
- Simes, Thomas; Dalrymple, Campbell (1776). The military guide for young officers. Philadelphia : Re-printed by J. Humphreys, R. Bell, and R. Aitken, printers and booksellers.
- Thomas, Isaiah (1874). The history of printing in America, with a biography of printers. Vol. I. New York, B. Franklin.
- Thomas, Isaiah (1874). The history of printing in America, with a biography of printers. Vol. II. New York, B. Franklin.
- "Common Sense". Thomas Paine Society.
- Wroth, Lawrence C. (1938). The Colonial Printer. Portland, Me., The Southworth-Anthoensen press.
