= State of Muskogee =

Short-lived nation in Florida from 1799 to 1803

Coordinates: 30.5949°N 84.0415°W

- 1799–1803
- Flag of the State of Muskogee
- Motto: Libertad o Muerte (Spanish) (English: "Liberty or Death")
- Status: Free State
- Capital: Mikasuke (near Tallahassee)
- Largest city: N/A
- Common languages: Spanish, English, Muskogean languages
- Religion: Roman Catholic, Native American religions
- Government: Republic
- Director General
  - 1799–1803: William Augustus Bowles
- Legislature: Chamber of Deputies
- History
  - Independence declared: 1799
  - Capture of William Bowles: May 24 1803

Population
  - 1799: 50,000−60,000
- Currency: USD
Preceded by	Succeeded by
United States; New Spain	United States

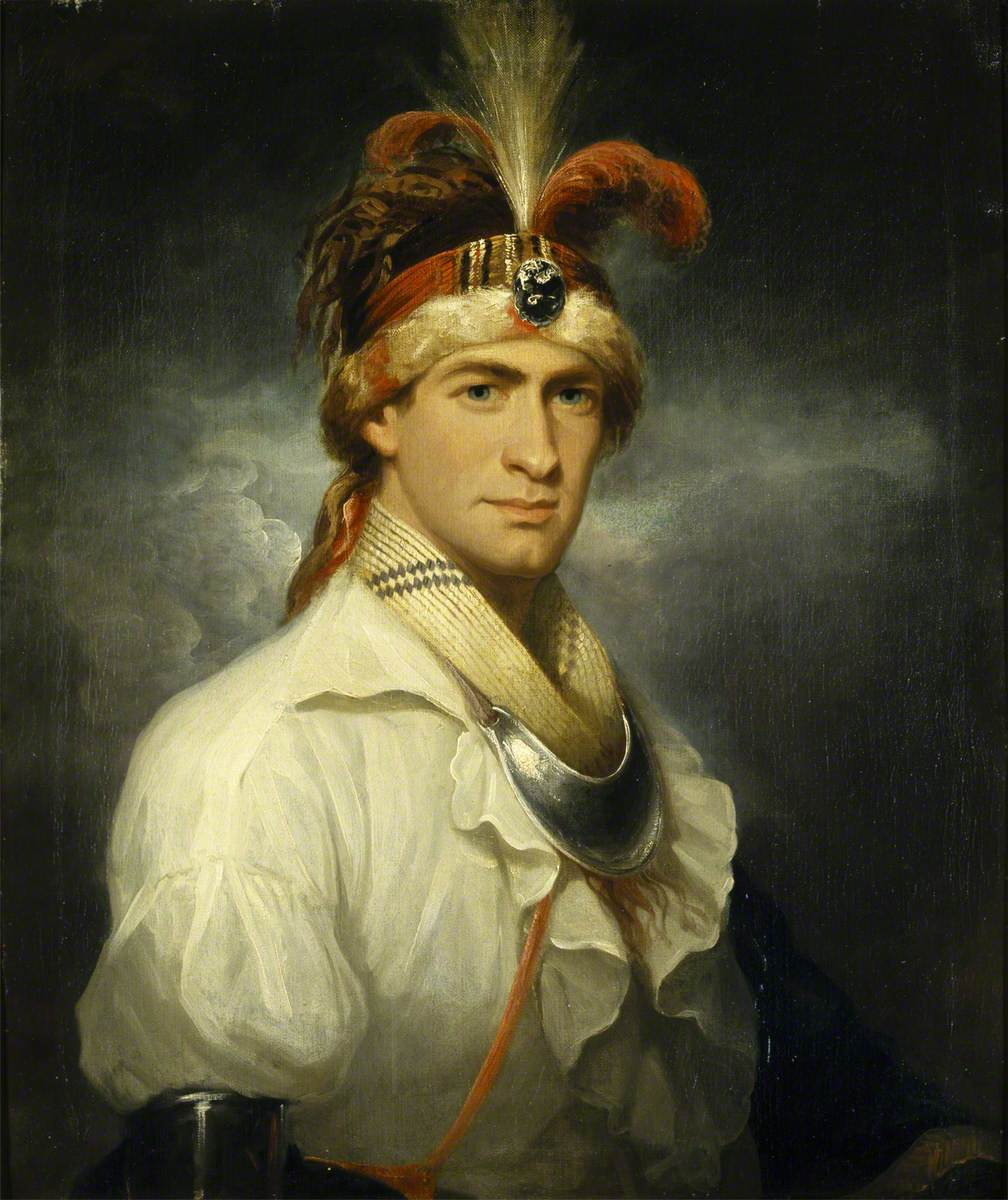
William Augustus Bowles (1763-1805) was also known as Estajoca, his Muscogee name.

The State of Muskogee was a proclaimed sovereign nation located in Florida, founded in 1799 and led by William Augustus Bowles, a Loyalist veteran of the American Revolutionary War who lived among the Muscogee, and envisioned uniting the Native Americans of the Southeast into a single nation that could resist the expansion of the United States. Bowles enjoyed the support of the Miccosukee (Seminole) and several bands of Muscogee. He envisioned his state as eventually growing to encompass the Cherokee, Upper and Lower Creeks, Choctaw, and Chickasaw, in parts of present-day Georgia and Alabama.

== History ==
Born into a Maryland Loyalist family, during the American Revolutionary War, William Bowles was commissioned at age 14 with the rank of Ensign in the Maryland Loyalist Battalion, commanded by James Chalmers. Bowles was sent with the First Battalion of Maryland Loyalists, as part of a provincial garrison stationed at Pensacola, where he resigned his commission. He fled north, living among the Muscogee of the Tallapoosa and Appalachicola, becoming fluent in the language, taking Cherokee and Hitchiti Muscogee wives and becoming heir to a Muscogee chiefdom. He led a band of Lower Creek warriors at the Battle at The Village and the Battle of Pensacola in 1781, a period when he developed a lifelong enmity with the Upper Creek chief Alexander McGillivray. After the war, he relocated to the Bahamas, where he was courted by Governor Lord Dunmore, who sought to break the monopoly of Panton, Leslie & Co. over the Native fur-trade, and allowed him to return to the Muscogee as an agent of a rival company. During this period, he developed his idea of a Native American state. He failed to capture Panton's St. Johns store, and became a fugitive from Spanish authorities, spending the next few years between Nova Scotia, the Bahamas, England, and the villages along the lower Chattahoochee River basin, where he gained support for a free state of Muskogee, assuring the Lower Creeks and Seminoles of British support.

On 16 January 1792, Bowles led a large band of Muscogee warriors who captured and looted the Panton, Leslie, and Co. store in the presidio of San Marcos de Apalache. He tried to negotiate with the Spanish for the establishment of a Muskogee state, but the Spaniards captured him instead. The Spanish wanted to remove him as far away from Florida as they could, and imprisoned him in Cuba, Madrid, and Manila. While being returned to Spain, Bowles escaped and seized command of a ship to Africa, and eventually made his way back to Florida after stopovers in England and Nassau to regather his British supporters.

Arriving on the Apalachicola Bay in 1799, Bowles made himself "Director General and Commander-In-Chief of the Muskogee Nation", and, on October 31, he issued a proclamation declaring the 1796 treaty between Spain and the United States void because it ignored the Natives' sovereignty over Florida. (Pinckney's Treaty ceded all of West Florida above the 31st parallel to the United States.) He denounced the treaties Alexander McGillivray had negotiated with Spain and the U.S., threatened to declare war against the U.S. unless it returned Muscogee lands that he claimed it had taken illegally, and issued a death sentence against George Washington's Indian agent Benjamin Hawkins. He defied American planters by welcoming runaway slaves and enjoyed great support among the Black Seminoles. Bowles had the support of the Seminoles and lower Chattahoochee Creeks because of his generous supply of gunpowder, and of his promises to get more when he captured the Panton-Leslie store at the presidio of San Marcos de Apalache.

Spanish attacks forced him to relocate the capital to the Native town of Miccosukee or Mikasuki on Lake Miccosukee, northeast of present-day Tallahassee, ruled by Mico Kinache, his father-in-law and most powerful ally. Several English adventurers from the Bahamas served as the government administrators. Bowles built a three-ship navy and attacked Spanish ships off the coast of Florida. In August 1800, a Spanish armed force set out to destroy Miccosuke, but was lost in the swamps. On 5 January 1802, Bowles led a large force of Seminoles (Miccosukees), Black Seminoles, fugitive slaves, white pirates, and Spanish deserters from Pensacola, and laid siege to San Marcos, but was forced to retreat after the arrival of several Spanish ships. The Treaty of Amiens in March 1802 briefly ended hostilities between Britain and France and Spain, and news of this ceasefire left Bowles discredited, the Seminoles (including Kinache) signing a treaty with Spain in August.

By 1803, the U.S. and Spain were conspiring against Bowles, who no longer enjoyed British support. Benjamin Hawkins laid a trap for him at a tribal council at the town of Tuckabatchee, where Bowles was captured and delivered to the Spanish governor in Pensacola. He was imprisoned in Morro Castle in Havana, where he died in 1805. The State of Muskogee demonstrated Spain's inability to control the interior of Florida.

In 1818, the Native American town of Miccosukee, Leon County, Florida, was destroyed by General Andrew Jackson's army during the First Seminole War.

== See also ==
- Indian barrier state
- Muscogee (Creek)
- State of Sequoyah
- Tecumseh's Confederacy
- Western Confederacy
- List of historical unrecognized states and dependencies
