= Plain Truth (pamphlet) =

1776 pamphlet by James Chalmers

Plain Truth; Addressed to the Inhabitants of America, Containing Remarks on a late pamphlet, entitled Common Sense
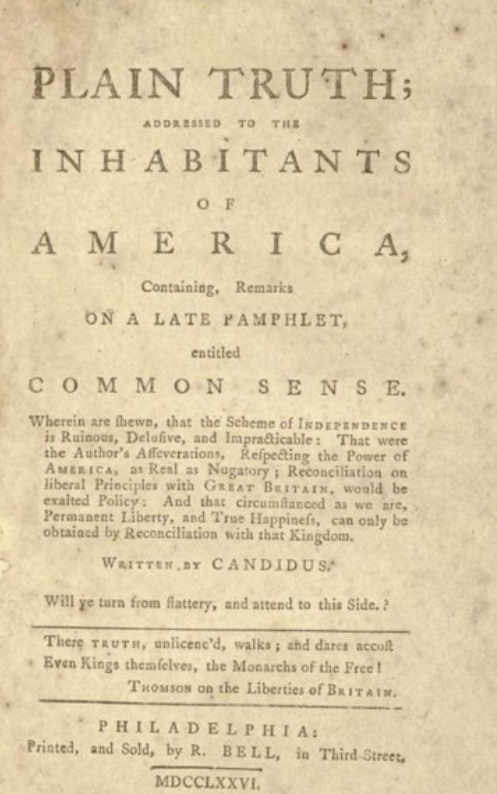
- Title page for Plain Truth; Addressed to the Inhabitants of America, Containing Remarks on a late pamphlet, entitled Common Sense (1776)
- Author: James Chalmers
- Language: English
- Publication date: 1776

Plain Truth; Addressed to the Inhabitants of America, Containing Remarks on a late pamphlet, entitled Common Sense is a pamphlet authored by the loyalist James Chalmers in 1776, as a rebuke of Thomas Paine's Common Sense.

== Content ==
Chalmers, under the pen name "Candidus", begins by stating his love for "true liberty", alongside his belief in Common Sense's insidious intent, which he believes will bring the Thirteen Colonies into "ruin, horror, and desolation." Plain Truth stated that Thomas Paine's complaints about the British Monarchy were "invalid" and "barbaric".

Plain Truth goes on denounce Common Sense's attempt to utilise religion to attack the institution of monarchy, pithily summarising that Thomas Paine should have added "Common Sense, and blood will attend it."

Chalmers then goes on to describe the British Constitution as being one consisting of "Monarchy, Aristocracy, and Democracy." He argues that without this mixed system, the constitution would devolve into a pure democracy. The author goes on to denounce the radical democratism which Common Sense extols, quoting Montesquieu that “No government is so subject to CIVIL WARS and INTESTINE COMMOTIONS”.

Another main argument against Thomas Paine’s Common Sense is that due to the eastern seaboard's exposed nature, and the size of the colonist armies, the thirteen colonies alone could not stand up to Britain.

Chalmers argues that Spanish and French Intervention would not be motivated to aid American independence, but merely to divert Britain's attention away from its empire.

James Chalmers finishes the pamphlet with the statement: "Independence and slavery are synonymous terms."
