= Alridge =

Alridge is a surname. Notable people with the surname include:

- Anthony Alridge (born 1984), American football player
- Waymon Alridge (born 1960), American football player

== See also ==
- Aldridge (surname)
- Arlidge
