= Brian Aldridge =

Brian Aldridge may refer to:

- Brian Aldridge (umpire) (1940–2021), New Zealand cricket umpire
- Brian Aldridge (politician) (born 1977), American politician in Mississippi
- Brian Aldridge (The Archers), a character from British radio series The Archers
