= Comparative Literature Studies =

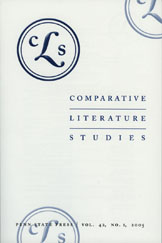
- Discipline: Literature
- Language: English
- Edited by: Nergis Ertürk

Publication details
- History: 1963-present
- Publisher: Penn State University Press (United States)
- Frequency: Quarterly

Standard abbreviations
- ISO 4: Comp. Lit. Stud.

Indexing
- ISSN: 0010-4132 (print); 1528-4212 (web)
- JSTOR: 00104132
- OCLC no.: 42631267

Links
- Journal homepage; Online access at Project MUSE

Comparative Literature Studies (CLS) is an academic journal in the field of comparative literature. It publishes critical comparative essays on literature, cultural production, the relationship between aesthetics and political thought, and histories and philosophies of form across the world. Articles may also address the transregional and transhistorical circulation of genres and movements across different languages, time periods, and media. Each issue also includes book reviews of significant monographs and collections of scholarship in comparative literature.

== History ==
Comparative Literature Studies was first published in 1963 at The University of Maryland at College Park by the founding editors, Alfred Owen Aldridge and Melvin J. Friedman. The first issue, published in 1963, was a special advance issue; it was "devoted entirely to the Proceedings of the First Triennial Meeting of the American Comparative Literature Association." The regular issues began to be published the next year, in 1964, with four issues each year. In their introductory written remarks on the establishment of the journal and its purpose printed in the first issue, the editors emphasized that the journal would "feature articles on literary history and the history of ideas, with particular emphasis on European literary relations with both North and South America." It gradually broadened this focus to include literature from Asia and Africa as well. Aldridge continued as editor through 1988. The journal's prize competition for best comparative essay by a graduate student is named after him.

Volumes 4, no. 3 (1967) to 23, no. 4 (1986) were published at the University of Illinois at Urbana under the auspices of its Program in Comparative Literature. From volume 24, no. 1 (1987), it began to be published by the Penn State University Press. Aldridge continued as editor throughout, but with issue 24.1, Stanley Weintraub joined him as co-editor. In 1989, Aldridge became editor emeritus and Gerhard F. Strasser joined Stanley Weintraub as co-editor. In 1992, beginning with volume 29, no. 3, Stanley Weintraub also became editor emeritus and Robert R. Edwards became editor-in-chief.

In 2001, Thomas O. Beebee succeeded Robert R. Edwards as editor-in-chief and served in this role for more than two decades. In January 2022, Nergis Ertürk joined him as co-editor. In January 2023, beginning with volume 60.1, Thomas O. Beebee became editor emeritus and Nergis Ertürk began her current term as editor-in-chief.

== Institutional affiliation ==
Comparative Literature Studies is currently published by the Penn State University Press and is distributed by the Johns Hopkins University Press. The journal is published under the auspices of the Department of Comparative Literature in the College of the Liberal Arts at the Pennsylvania State University.

== Special issues ==
The journal is published quarterly. One volume, containing the four quarterly issues, is published annually. Two issues per year are typically devoted to special issue topics.

== A. Owen Aldridge Prize ==
Comparative Literature Studies publishes an annual prize-paper written by a graduate student. The competition is named in honor of A. Owen Aldridge, founder of the journal. The purpose of this competition is to encourage and recognize excellence in scholarship among graduate students and to reward the highest achievement by publication. This project is sponsored in cooperation with the American Comparative Literature Association and supported by the Department of Comparative Literature at Penn State. The award carries a monetary prize as well, including an honorarium and help with travel expenses to attend the American Comparative Literature Association meeting.
