= San Marcos de Apalache Historic State Park =

Archaeological site in Florida, United States

- The museum at the park

- Location within Florida Location within the United States
- Interactive map of San Marcos de Apalache Historic State Park
- Location: St. Marks, Florida
- Nearest city: St. Marks
- Coordinates: 30°09′07″N 84°12′39″W
- Area: 15 acres (6.1 ha)
- Fort San Marcos De Apalache
- U.S. National Register of Historic Places
- NRHP reference No.: 66000271
- Added to NRHP: November 13, 1966

San Marcos de Apalache Historic State Park is a Florida State Park in Wakulla County, Florida, organized around the historic site of a Spanish colonial fort (known as Fort St. Marks by the English and Americans), which was used by succeeding nations that controlled the area. The Spanish first built wooden buildings and a stockade in the late 17th and early 18th centuries here, which were destroyed by a hurricane.

The stone fort was built beginning in 1753. It came under successive control by Great Britain, Spain, the United States and, lastly, the Confederacy during the American Civil War. A U.S. Marine Hospital was built from the materials of the fort. The US took control of the site again in 1865, and the fort site was abandoned.

On November 13, 1966, the fort area was designated a National Historic Landmark because of its significance and added to the U.S. National Register of Historic Places. Designated as a National Engineering Landmark, the fort site has been highlighted on the Florida Native American Heritage Trail. On October 10, 1962, Congress authorized designating Fort Saint Marks as a National Historic Site upon donation of the site to the National Park Service. That donation apparently never happened, however, and the site remains a Florida State Park and a National Historic Landmark.

The historic park is located in the vicinity of St. Marks, off S.R. 363, at 148 Old Fort Road.

== History ==
In 1679, the Spanish built a wooden stockade at this site which they called San Marcos de Apalache. It was part of their colonial expansion in the northwestern Florida area. A settlement developed around the fort beginning about 1733. Another wooden structure was built about 1753. The wooden fort was destroyed and the garrison drowned, during a hurricane.

In 1759, the Spanish began to build a stone fort, designed to resist bombardment by ships. They abandoned it to Indians for use as a trading post after ceding this territory to the British following the defeat of France in the Seven Years' War, also known as the French and Indian War. The British had a garrison at the fort.

But, following the American Revolutionary War, the British traded some territory with Spain, which took over West and East Florida again. (St. Marks was in East Florida; the boundary was the Apalachicola River). Spanish forces reoccupied the San Marcos fort in 1783, and they strengthened its defenses. American settlers began penetrating the Southeast after the Revolution, settling deeper into Georgia and into the Mississippi and Alabama Territories.

General Andrew Jackson led some raids into this area during the First Seminole War and had his forces seize the Spanish Florida fort in 1818. In April 1818, the Fort was the site of the Arbuthnot and Ambrister incident. The U.S. occupied it for nearly a year. The Fort St. Marks military cemetery was established at that time, for the burial of men who died at the garrison. A total of 19 men were buried in the cemetery; most died from diseases, including dysentery and consumption. In 1819, the United States purchased East and West Florida from Spain, via the Adams-Onis Treaty, including the fort site.

In 1859, the federal government built a marine hospital here, using stones and other materials from the old fort. It provided care for sick seamen and area yellow fever victims.

During the Civil War, the Confederate army took over the site and named it Fort Ward, after Florida seceded from the Union. U.S. forces regained control in 1865, in the last year of the war.

Remains of the stone fort are in evidence at the site. A museum and visitor center have been built on the foundation of the old hospital. A stone well and a retaining wall have been reconstructed nearby, based on archaeological documentation.

== Recreational activities ==
The park has such amenities as hiking and picnicking areas. The museum displays pottery and tools excavated near the original fort, and a self-guided interpretive trail explains the site’s history.

== See also ==
- St. Marks, Florida
- Apalachee Bay
- St. Marks River
- Wakulla River
- Wakulla County, Florida - This article says Fort San Marcos was captured, early in the 19th century, by William Augustus Bowles of the short-lived State of Muskogee.
- Negro Fort
- Arbuthnot and Ambrister Incident
- List of National Historic Landmarks in Florida

== Gallery ==
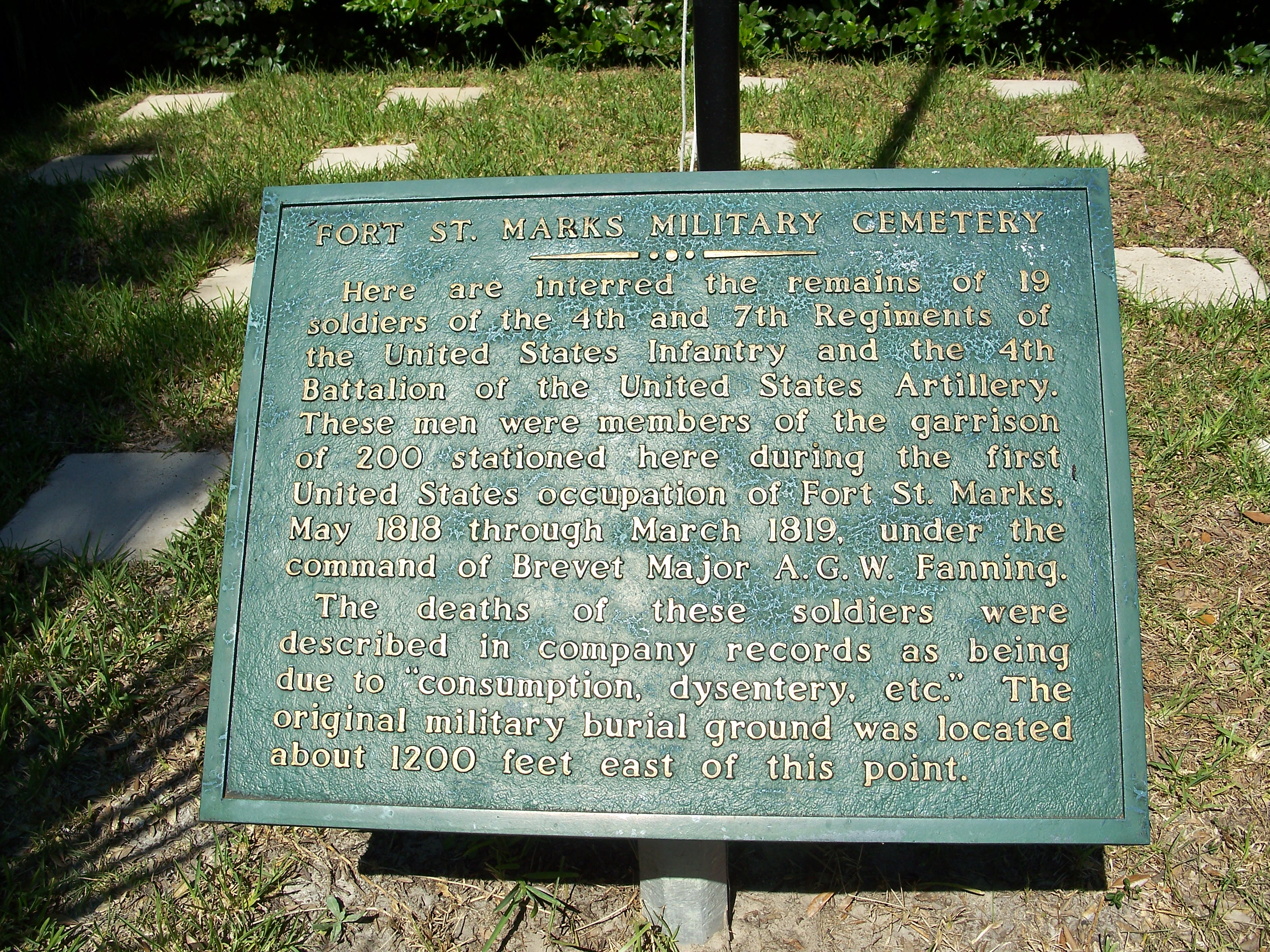
Marker for Fort St. Marks Military Cemetery (1818-1819)

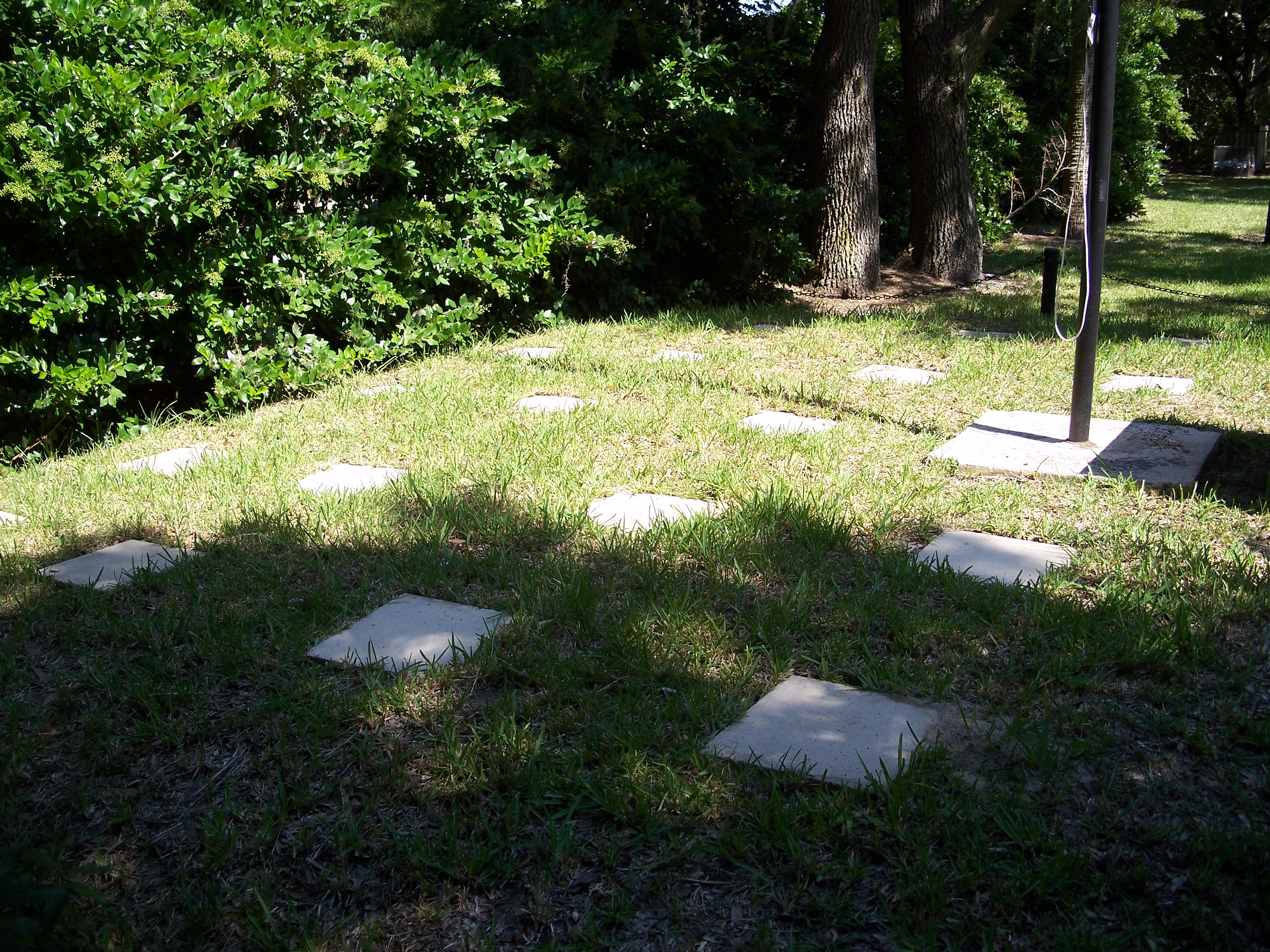
Gravesites in the military cemetery

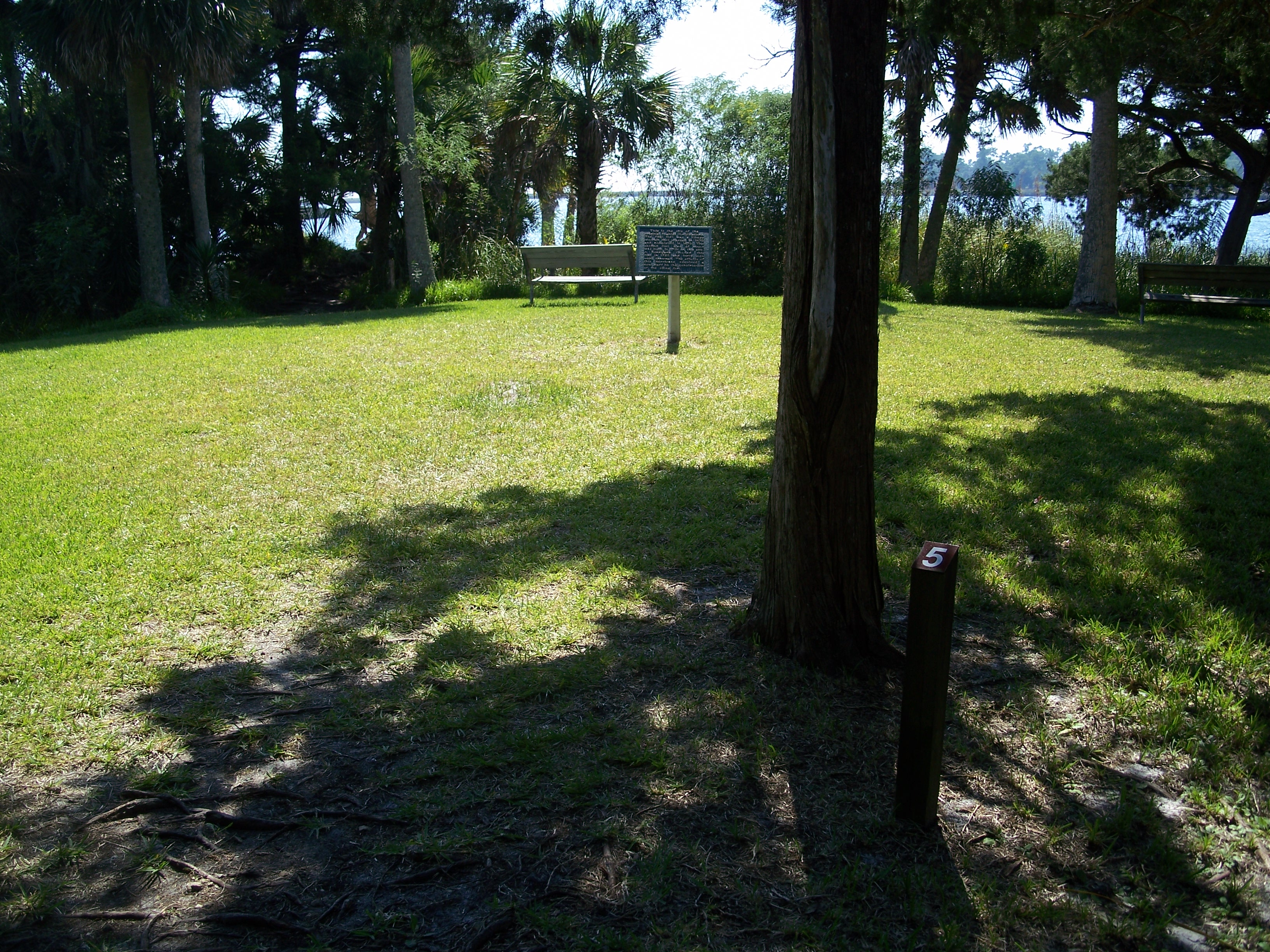
Fort site, rivers in distance

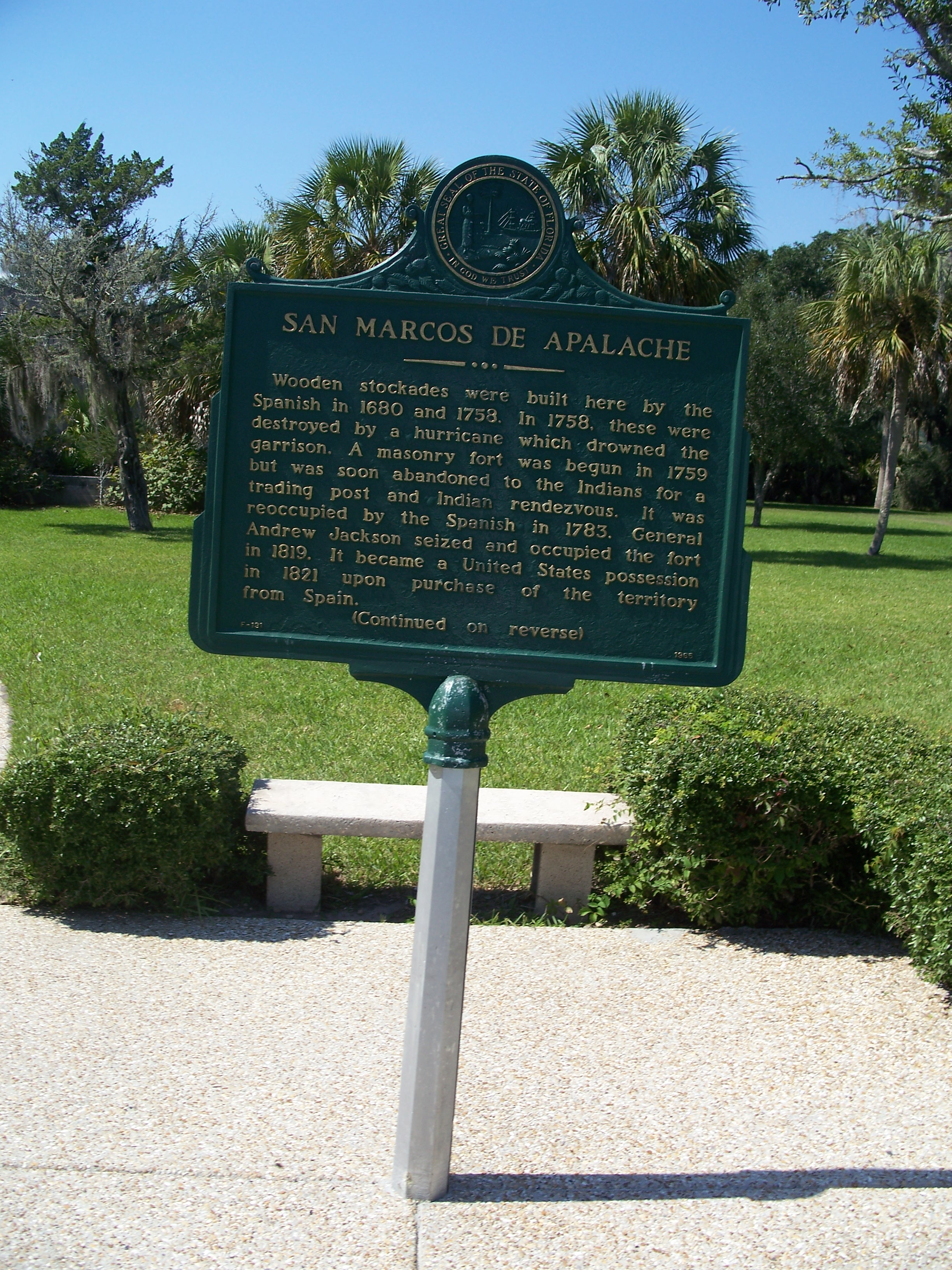
Marker for the state historic park

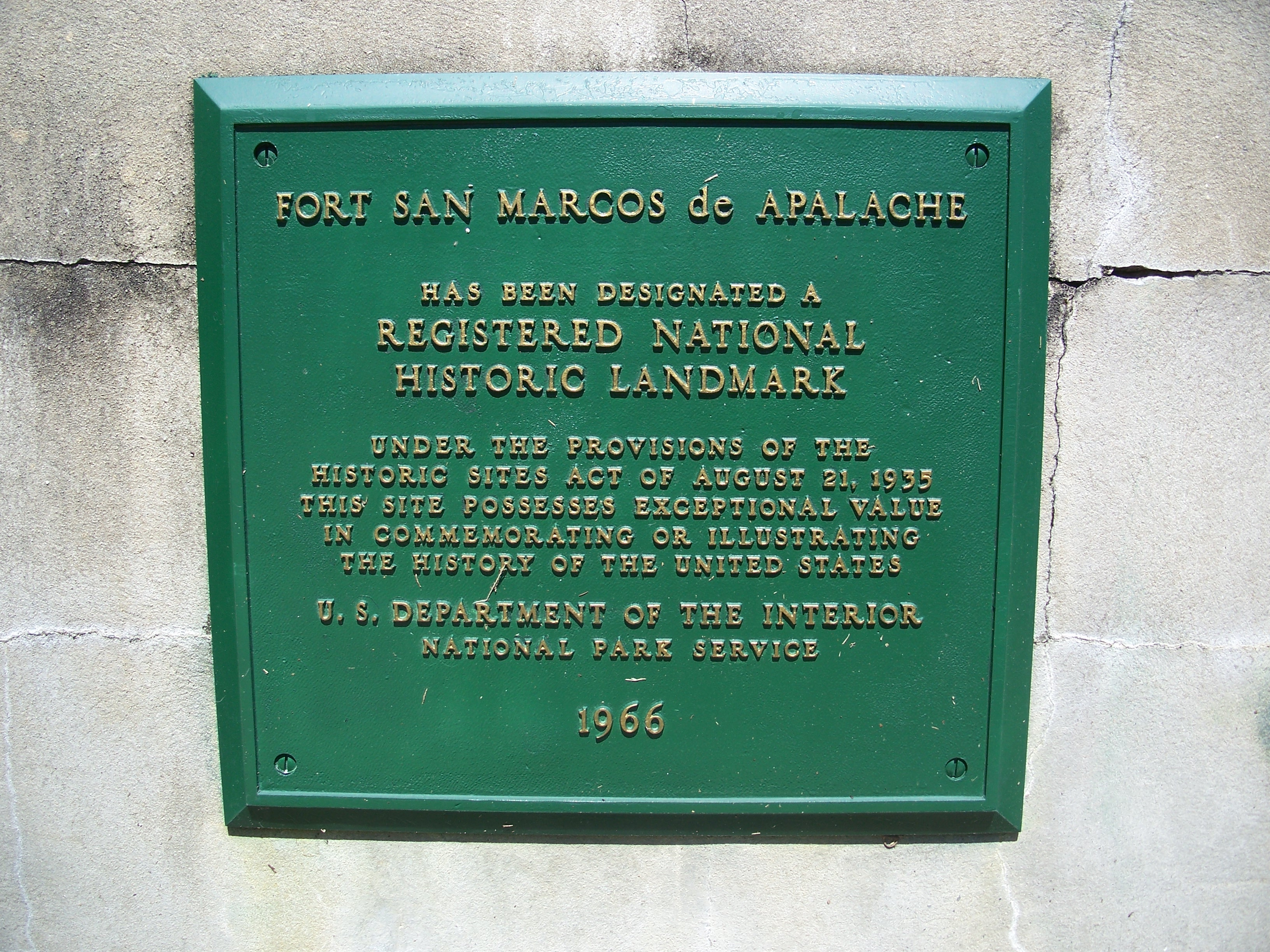
National Historic Landmark plaque

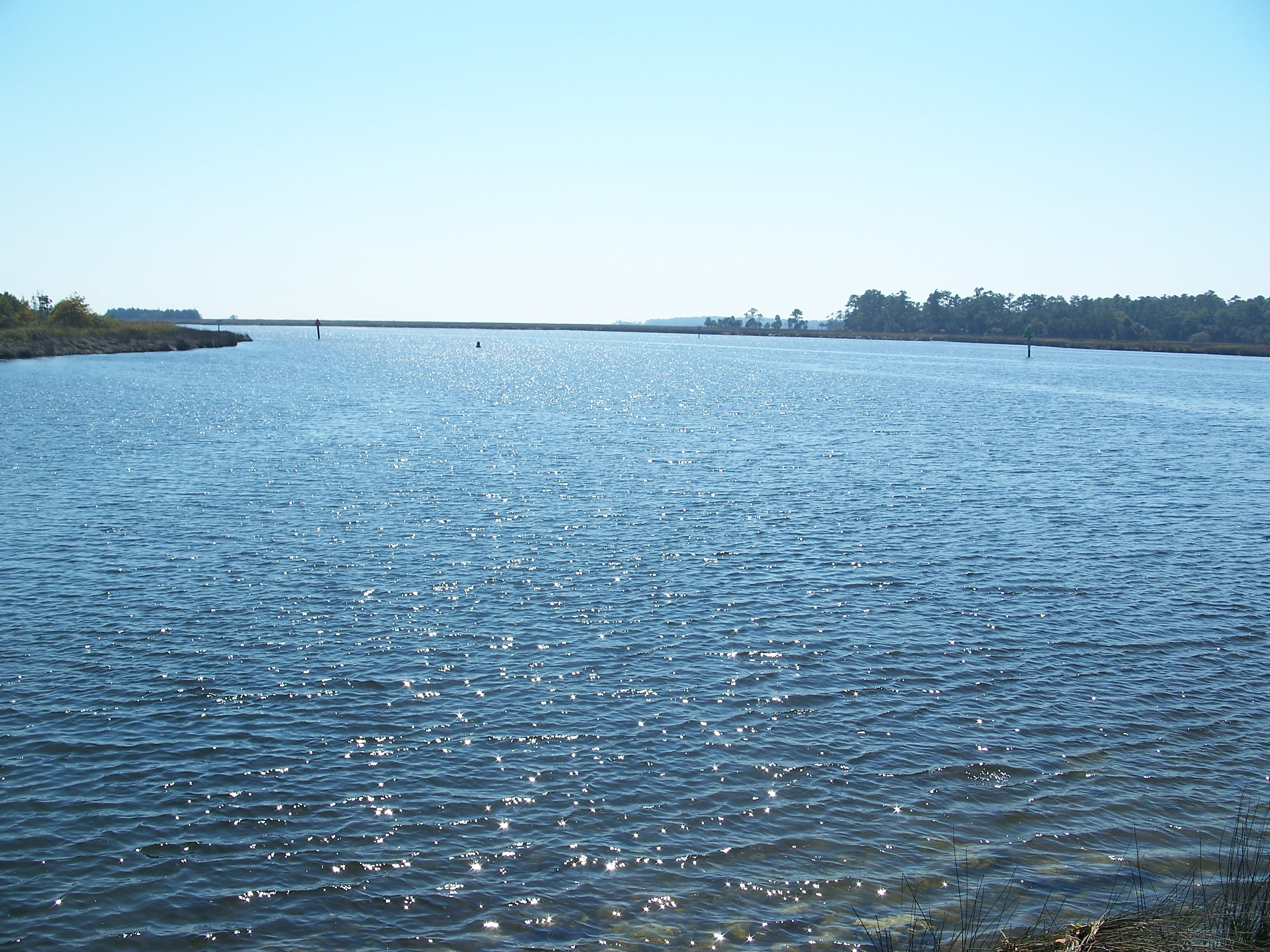
View from the fort of St. Marks and Wakulla Rivers' confluence

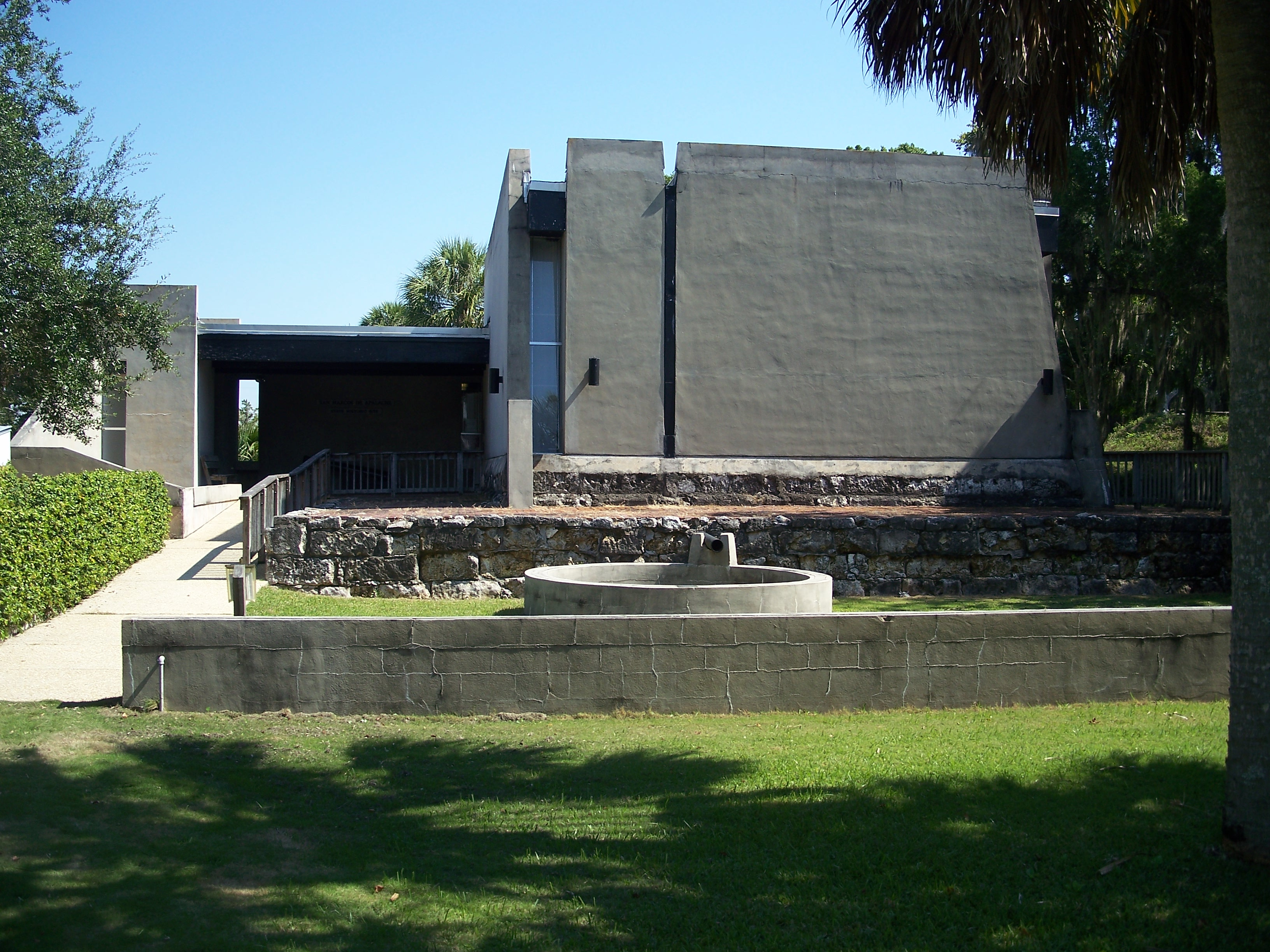
Museum built on foundations of Civil War hospital; reconstructed well and wall

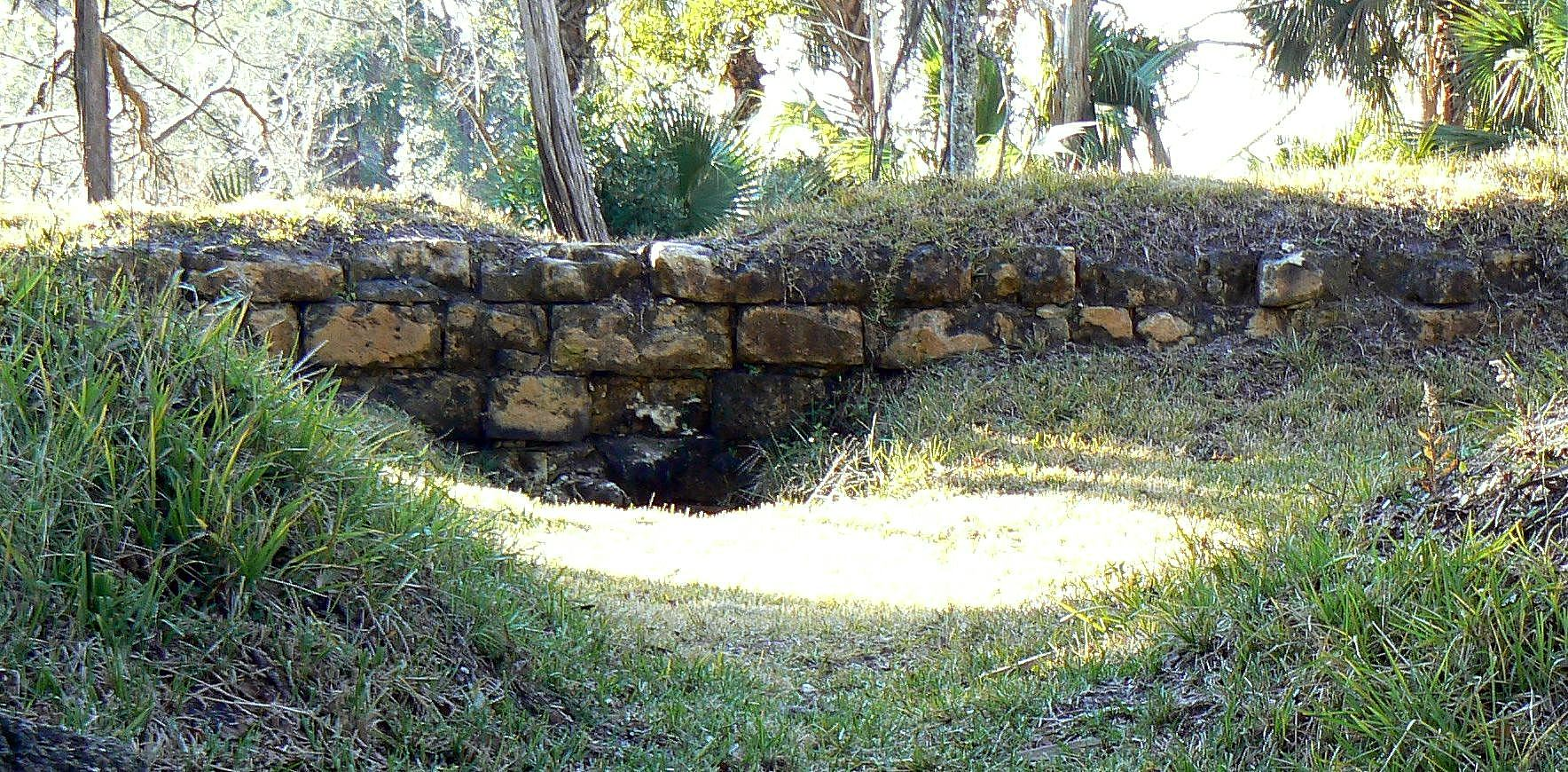
One of the small remaining portions of the stone fort.
