= Aldredge =

Aldredge is a surname. Notable people with the surname include:

- Gertrude Aldredge Shelburne (1907–1993), American women's rights activist
- Sawnie R. Aldredge (1890–1949), American lawyer, judge and politician
- Theoni V. Aldredge (1922–2011), Greek-American costume designer
- Tom Aldredge (1928–2011), American actor

== See also ==
- Aldridge (surname)
