= Thoughts on Government =

1776 essay by John Adams

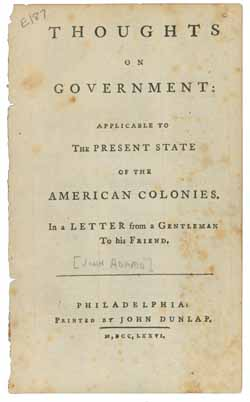
The book Thoughts on Government by John Adams (1776)

Thoughts on Government, or in full Thoughts on Government, Applicable to the Present State of the American Colonies, was written by John Adams during the spring of 1776 in response to a resolution of the North Carolina Provincial Congress which requested Adams' suggestions on the establishment of a new government and the drafting of a constitution. Adams says that "Politics is the Science of human Happiness—and the Felicity of Societies depends on the Constitutions of Government under which they live." Many of the ideas put forth in Adams' essay were adopted in December 1776 by the framers of North Carolina's first constitution.

The document is notable in that Adams sketches out the three branches of American government: the executive, judicial, and legislative branches, all with a system of checks and balances. Furthermore, in response to Common Sense by Thomas Paine, Adams rejects the idea of a single legislative body, fearing it may become tyrannical or self-serving (as in the case of the Netherlands at the time). Thus, Adams also conceived of the idea that two legislative bodies should serve as checks to the power of the other.

== See also ==
- John Adams#Thoughts_on_Government
- Constitutionalism
- Rule according to higher law
