= James Chalmers (loyalist) =

Loyalist officer and pamphleteer in the American Revolution

James Chalmers (died October 4, 1806) was a Loyalist officer and pamphleteer in the American Revolution.

Born in Elgin, Moray, Scotland, Chalmers was an ambitious military strategist after the War of Independence, who immigrated to America in 1760 "with several black slaves and 10,000 British pounds in his pocket," settling in Kent County and becoming "one of the Eastern Shore's most prominent landowners."

== American Revolution ==
In 1776 he authored a pamphlet entitled Plain Truth, a rebuke of Thomas Paine's Common Sense, going under the pen name "Candidus."

After conditions grew intolerable in his home in Chestertown, Maryland, with a mob chasing him after publishing Plain Truth, Chalmers accompanied the British Army under General Sir William Howe up the Chesapeake Bay as it made its way to Philadelphia in August 1777.

After the Battle of Brandywine in September, Philadelphia fell to the British in early October. On 14 October, Chalmers was commissioned lieutenant colonel of the First Battalion of Maryland Loyalists, a unit created by William Howe, and he quickly commissioned Philip Barton Key as a captain of the same regiment. In correspondence with British commanders, he often advocated occupation of the Eastern Shore of Maryland, but was ignored.

His regiment originally recruited around Philadelphia and later expanded its range to include Maryland's Eastern Shore. Apart from Chalmers, a planter in Kent County, Maryland, there were a number of other commissioned officers. They included Patrick Kennedy (Captain), Grafton Dulany (Captain), Walter Dulany (Captain), Caleb Jones (Captain), Isaac Costin (Captain), and James Frisby (Captain). Other officers included William Augustus Bowles as an ensign and John McDonald as a major. Eventually the captains would be divided between the Chesapeake Bay's Western and Eastern Shores.

From November 1777 until spring of the following year, the soldiers trained, then marching to Long Island where they stayed until late 1778. During this period, when the regiment was combined with a loyalist regiment from Pennsylvania, soldiers had no uniforms. They dressed in "tatters and rags instead of uniforms" as General John Campbell described in the summer of 1779.

The regiment often faced problems with numbers because of death from disease and desertion. In February 1781, there were only "300 rank-and-file members" in the regiment, while by May the number only number 160 men! By 1782, Chalmers, did not have a full roster with a regiment that was "very deficient in numbers" even as it was one of the only pro-Crown regiments that was "regularly organized, officered, and paid."

Soon enough, the regiment saw their first action. They fought in West Florida until in the siege of Pensacola, a Spanish victory where the entire regiment was captured by Spanish forces. After that point, those of the regiment who did not die from smallpox were summarily sent back to New York. Luckily for Chalmers, he was in then British-occupied New York City and so he was not captured.

== Final years ==
After the war, no longer welcome in the United States, Chalmers fled into exile. He settled in England and wrote another pamphlet attacking Paine's economic policies as well as a pamphlet regarding war in Santo Domingo.

Later, he rejoined the military, served as inspector general in the West Indies. In the years that would follow, he returned to London, living out "the rest of his life, continuing to write pamphlets against the works of Paine."

He died at his home, 12 Paradise Row, in Chelsea, London, on 4 October 1806. He was buried in the chapel near the altar of Stow Maries Church, near Chelmsford, six days later. The inscription on the stone reads: "Beneath this stone are deposited the remains of Col. James Chalmers late of Chelsea, County of Middlesex, who departed this life 3 Oct. 1806, aged 72 years."

One of his daughters, Arianna Chalmers, would later marry Captain John Saunders, and Chalmers would be described as a "wealthy and distinguished Loyalist who raised the Maryland Loyalists during the American Revolution."
