= Mercer University School of Engineering =

Coordinates: 32.831578°N 83.647019°W

- Type: Private
- Established: 1985
- Dean: Dr. Laura Lackey
- Administrative staff: 33
- Students: 650
- Location: Macon, Georgia, USA
- Website: [www.engineering.mercer.edu]

The Mercer University School of Engineering (MUSE) is one of Mercer University's twelve colleges and schools. MUSE, located on Mercer's main campus in Macon, Georgia, offers 10 different engineering-related majors and enrolls approximately 650 students. U.S. News & World Report ranks the school among the best engineering schools in the southern United States.

== History ==
MUSE, founded in 1985, is the only private engineering school in Georgia and one of five engineering schools in the state, the others are Georgia Institute of Technology, University of Georgia, Georgia Southern and Southern Polytechnic State University /Kennesaw State University. MUSE offers undergraduate and graduate degrees and is the primary provider of engineers for Robins Air Force Base in Warner Robins, which was the main reason for MUSE's founding. MUSE was once referred to as Georgia's "other" engineering school.

=== Former Deans ===
- M. Dayne Aldridge, 1999–2008
- Wade H. Shaw, 2009–2017

== Facts and figures ==
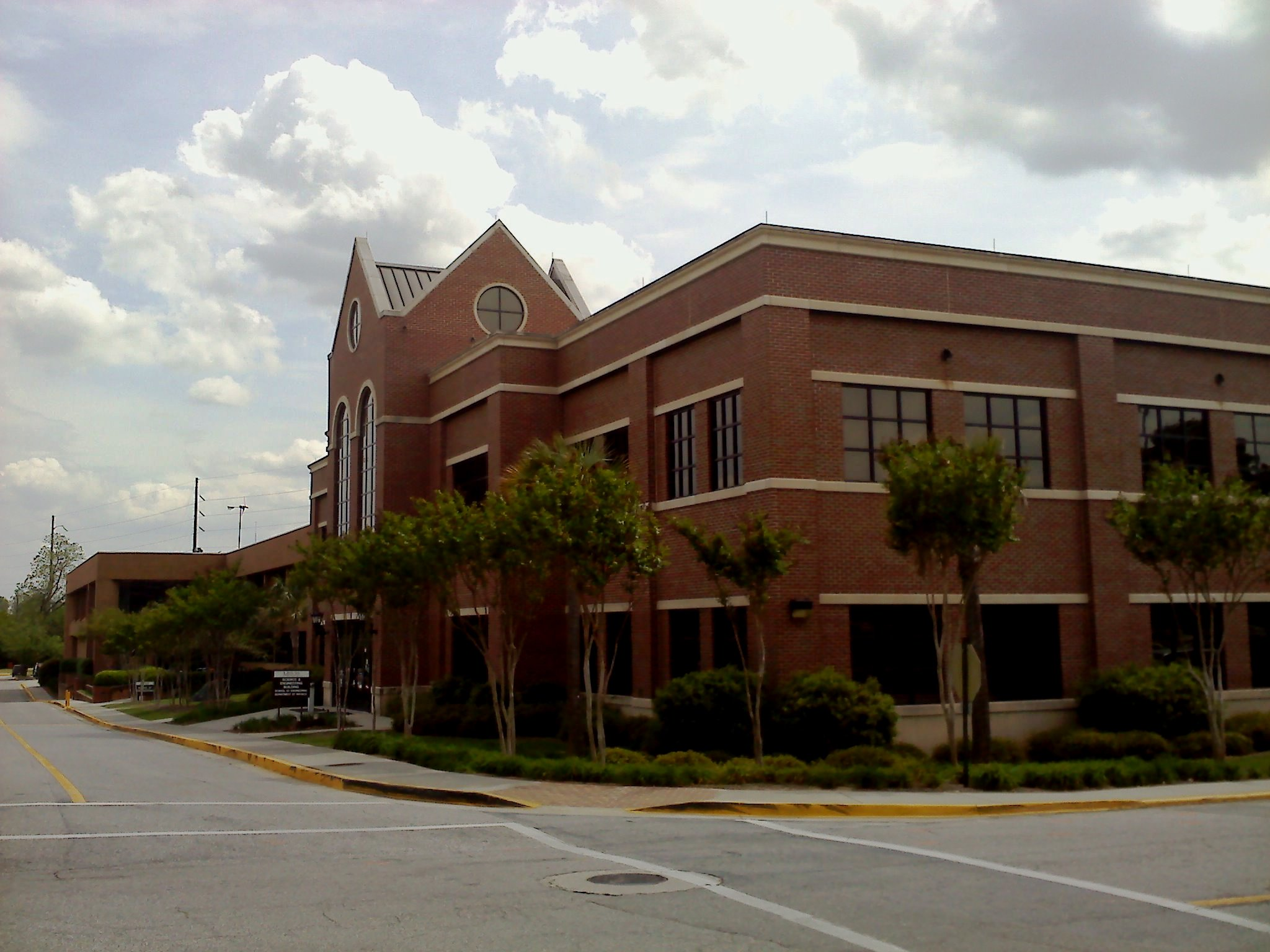
Science and Engineering Building

MUSE offers bachelor of science (BS), bachelor of science in engineering (BSE), master of science (MS), and master of science in engineering (MSE) degrees. Majors include biomedical, computer, electrical, environmental, industrial, and mechanical engineering as well as software engineering/software systems, engineering management, and technical management. MUSE has approximately 30 full-time faculty members.

MUSE is housed in a modern 62,000-square-foot (5,800 m^{2}) academic building on Mercer's main campus. In addition, in 2007 Mercer dedicated a new $14 million Science and Engineering Building adjacent to the existing school. The new building provides additional laboratory and classroom facilities for MUSE and for science programs offered by Mercer's College of Liberal Arts.

The Mercer Engineering Research Center, an extension of the school located in Warner Robins, directly supports Robins Air Force Base and offers significant research opportunities for students. In addition, the school's National Engineering Advisory Board, composed of some of the nation's most respected corporate leaders including Northrop Grumman, Lockheed Martin, Raytheon, Boeing, and Georgia Pacific, provides premier research and career opportunities for students.

MUSE and Robins Air Force Base maintain an educational partnership that provides on-base internships and other learning opportunities for aerospace engineering students. The partnership is separate from the Mercer Engineering Research Center, which is located near the base in Warner Robins. The educational partnership is one of two maintained by Mercer University, the other involves Mercer's School of Medicine and College of Nursing with Piedmont Healthcare of Atlanta.

The Clinton Global Initiative University, a program of the William J. Clinton Foundation, recognized Mercer University in 2009 for its Mercer On Mission project, which provides amputees in developing nations with low-cost prosthetics. The prosthetics use a universal socket technology developed by School of Engineering faculty and students. Mercer On Mission was one of only three university projects recognized by former President Bill Clinton at the CGI University annual conference.
