= Arlidge =

Arlidge is a surname. Notable people with the surname include:

- Anthony Arlidge (1937–2023), British lawyer
- James Arlidge (born 1979), Japanese rugby union player
- M. J. Arlidge (born 1974), British crime author

== See also ==
- Alridge
