= Maryland Loyalists Battalion =

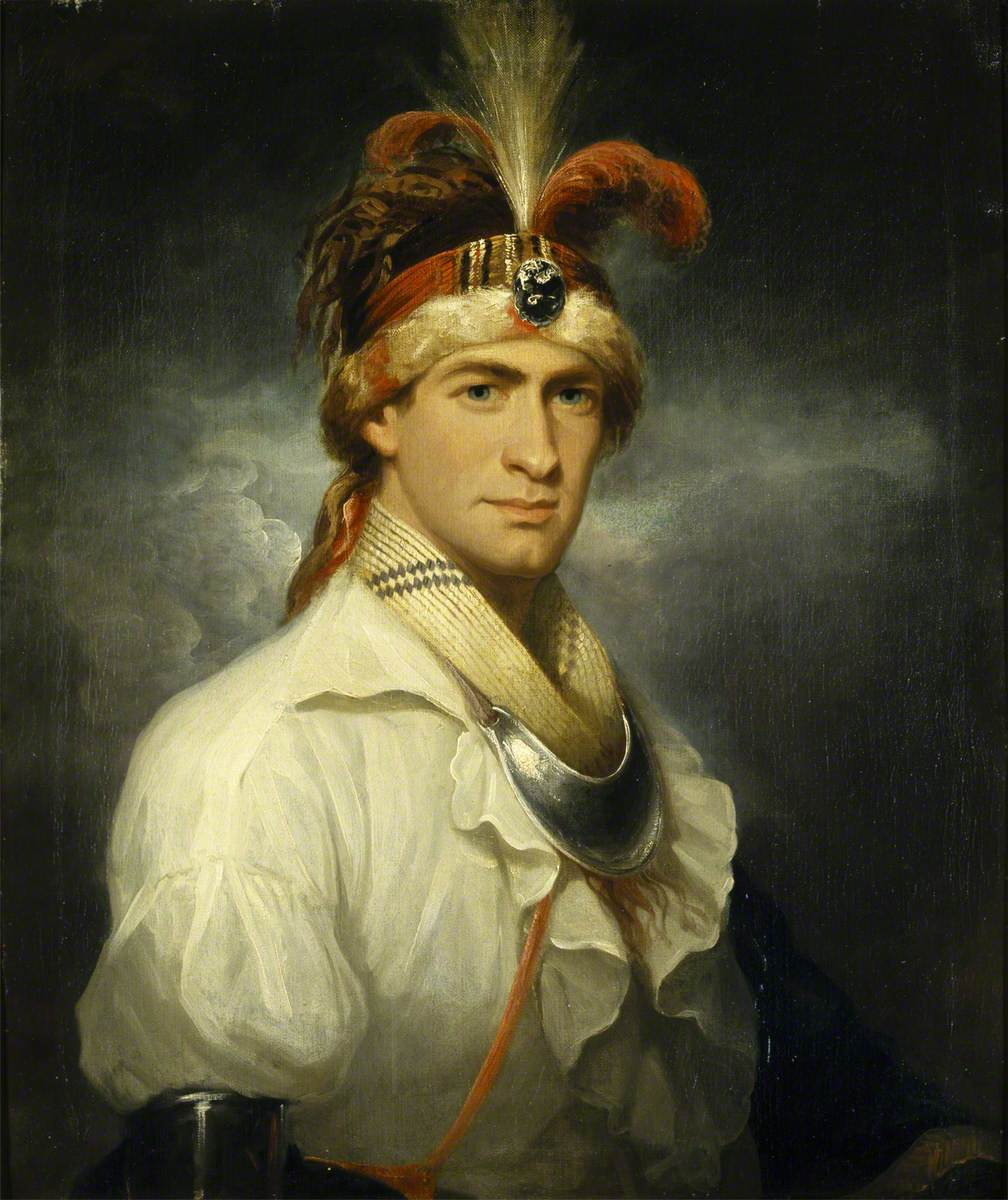
- William Augustus Bowles, who served in the Maryland Loyalists Battalion.
- Active: 1777–1783
- Country: Province of Maryland
- Allegiance: Great Britain
- Branch: Provincial Corps
- Type: Infantry
- Size: One battalion
- Garrison/HQ: Pensacola, West Florida
- Engagements: American Revolutionary War; Battle of Monmouth; Siege of Pensacola

Commanders
- Notable commanders: Lieutenant-Colonel James Chalmers

The Maryland Loyalists Battalion, also known as the First Battalion of Maryland Loyalists, was a Loyalist infantry unit which served on the side of the Kingdom of Great Britain during the American Revolutionary War. Raised in 1777 by Loyalist officer James Chalmers, the unit, consisting of one battalion, was organizationally part of the British Provincial Corps and saw action at the 1778 Battle of Monmouth and the 1781 Siege of Pensacola. It was disbanded in 1783 in the wake of the Patriot victory in the war.

== Background ==
As with other colonies in British America, Maryland was bitterly divided by the American Revolution. Members of the existing political elite tended to make reluctant revolutionaries; men such as Benedict Swingate Calvert, illegitimate son of the ruling Calvert family and a judge of the land office, remained loyal to the British Crown, and would suffer the consequences. Like other loyalists, Calvert would find himself on the losing side of the Revolutionary War, effectively ending his political career. The Annapolis Convention of 1774 to 1776 saw the old Maryland elite overthrown – men like Calvert, Governor Eden and George Steuart all lost their political power, and in many cases their land and wealth. After the war, Loyalists would have to pay triple taxes and were forced to sign the loyalty oath. Many had their lands and property confiscated.

== Service ==
The unit was composed primarily of colonists from the Eastern Shore of Maryland; it was commissioned in British-held Philadelphia in mid-October 1777 as "The First Battalion of Maryland Loyalists." The unit's commander, Lt. Col. James Chalmers of Newtown, Maryland (present-day Chestertown), was an active Loyalist writer.

The Maryland Loyalists saw limited action in 1778 at the Battle of Monmouth before being shipped off to Pensacola, West Florida, to fight the Spanish in the fall. A number of soldiers of the battalion died of smallpox upon arrival. Weakened by the epidemic and limited manpower, the Maryland Loyalists garrison was subsequently defeated by the Spanish in the siege of Pensacola in 1781. After a brief time as Spanish prisoners of war in Cuba, the battalion was eventually sent back to New York City, the command center for British forces during the war.

After the war, the soldiers of the battalion, along with many other American loyalists, were transported by the British government as refugees to Nova Scotia. In the fall of 1783, a ship carrying the exiled battalion was shipwrecked off the Nova Scotia coast. The survivors made up the first British American citizens of the new Canadian province of New Brunswick.

== Notable soldiers ==
William Augustus Bowles was an ensign in the Maryland Loyalists Battalion. In the 1790s, he became a leader of the Creek Indians.

Philip Barton Key was a captain in the Maryland Loyalists Battalion. After the war, Key studied law in England and returned to Maryland in 1785. He was admitted to the bar and entered private practice in Leonardtown, Maryland from 1787 to 1790. He practiced in Annapolis, Maryland from 1790 to 1794, and from 1799 to 1800. Key was a member of the Maryland House of Delegates from 1794 to 1799 and Mayor of Annapolis from 1797 to 1798.

== See also ==
- Maryland in the American Revolution
- Spain in the American Revolutionary War
