= Michael Aldridge (rugby union) =

Australian rugby union player

Michael Robert Aldridge (born 8 March 1983) is an Australian rugby union player. He plays as a lock. Michael commenced his rugby career in Sydney before moving to Italy to further pursue his career. His mother, Julie Aldridge is of Italian background which allows Michael to have dual Italian and Australian citizenship.

Michael played in the 2003 IRB Under 21 World Cup for Italy. He was selected in the Italian A squad the following year, but was unavailable to play.

Below is a list of the clubs that Michael has played for throughout his career:

2002 Easts Rugby Club
2002/03 Rugby Viadana
2003/04 Rugby Viadana
2004/05 Rugby Viadana
2005/06 Rugby Roma Olimpic
2006/07 Rugby Roma Olimpic
2007/08 Rugby Roma Olimpic
2008/09 Rugby Roma Olimpic
