= Charles Aldridge =

New Zealand cricketer (born 1947)

Personal information
- Full name: Charles William Aldridge
- Born: 12 May 1947 (age 79); Balclutha, Otago, New Zealand
- Batting: Left-handed
- Bowling: Right-arm medium-fast

Domestic team information
- Years: Team
- 1973/74: Canterbury
- 1977/78–1978/79: Northern Districts
- 1978/79–1980/81: Bay of Plenty
- Source: Cricinfo, 13 October 2020

Charles William Aldridge (born 12 May 1947), known as Bill Aldridge, is a New Zealand former cricketer. He played in four first-class matches for Canterbury during the 1973–74 season, and in three List A matches for Northern Districts, two in 1977–78 and one in 1978–79. He also played Hawke Cup cricket for Bay of Plenty.

Aldridge was born at Balclutha in Otago in 1947 and educated at Christchurch Boys' High School. Described as a "strong and lively" bowler, he made his representative debut for Canterbury against Northern Districts in December 1973, taking six wickets in the match.

Professionally Aldridge worked in the retail industry. His son, Graeme Aldridge, played professional cricket for Northern Districts and made three appearances in one-day cricket for the New Zealand national side.
