= Robert Aldridge =

Robert Aldridge may also refer to:

- Robert Aldridge (priest) (died 1616), English clergyman
- Robert Aldridge (MP) (c. 1768–1837), Irish politician, MP for Carysfort 1799–1800
- Robert Aldridge (composer) (born 1954), American composer
