= M. Dayne Aldridge =

American academic

M. Dayne Aldridge, Sc.D., P.E. is the former Dean of the School of Engineering at Mercer University. Aldridge served as dean from 1999 to June 30, 2008. He was formerly the associate dean for cross-disciplinary programs in the College of Engineering at Auburn University and served as director of the Thomas Walter Center for Technology Management. He is a fellow of the Institute of Electrical and Electronics Engineers (IEEE) and has served as the president of the IEEE Industry Applications Society. He graduated from West Virginia University in 1963 and received his masters' and doctorate in Electrical Engineering from the University of Virginia in 1965 and 1968.
