= John Mullings Aldridge =

Anglican priest

John Mullings Aldridge (1843 – 18 March 1920) was an Anglican priest during the second half of the nineteenth century and the first decades of the 20th.

Aldridge was born in Devizes, Wiltshire, and educated at Trinity College, Dublin. He was ordained deacon and priest in 1870. After a curacy in Kilcummin, he held incumbencies at Eyrecourt, Forfar, West Bridgford, Clanfield and Meysey Hampton. He was Dean of Clonfert from 1907 to 1920, when he died at the rectory in Eyrecourt.
