= William Augustus Bowles =

American-born military officer and adventurer (1763–1805)

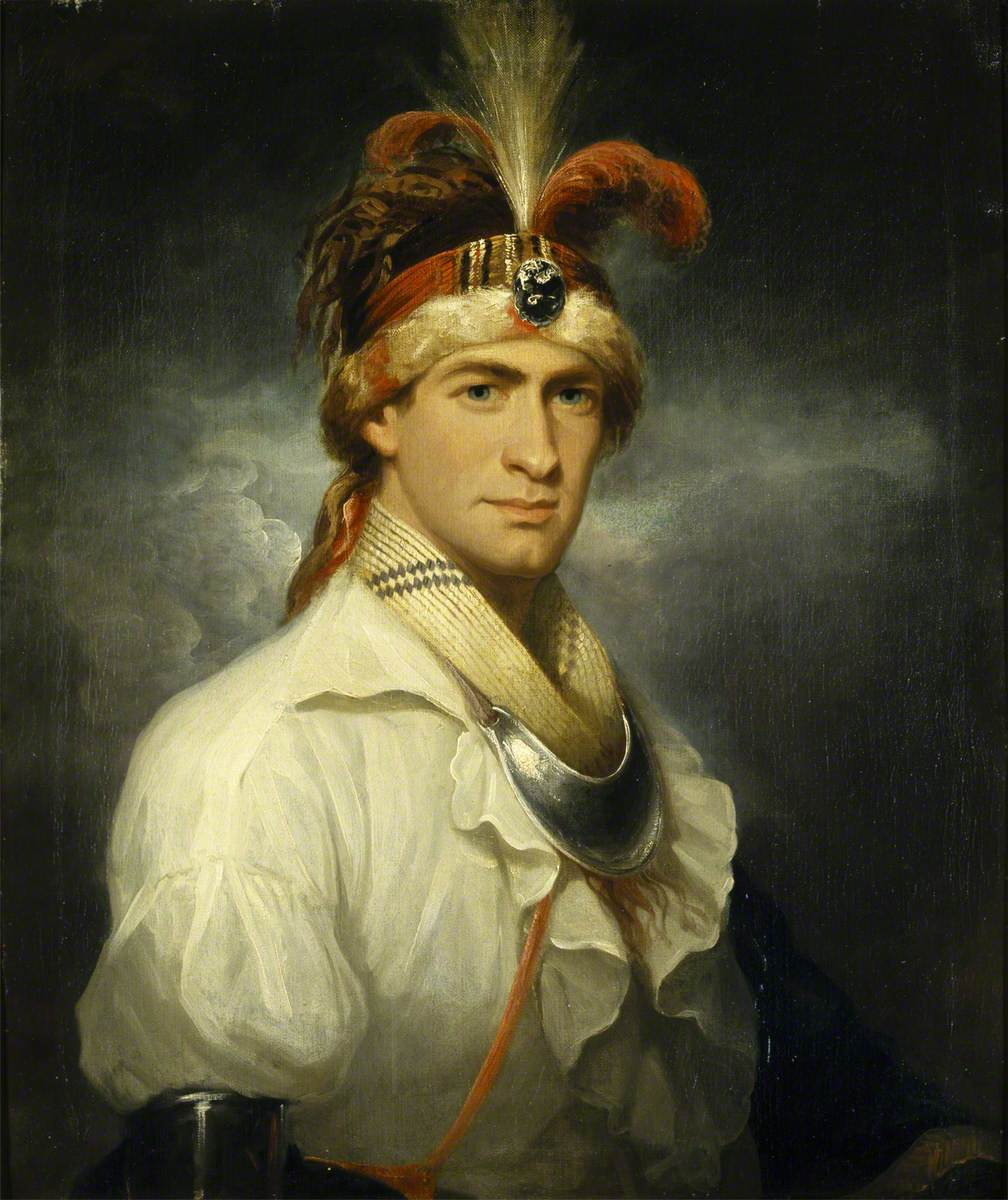
- Portrait by Thomas Bush Hardy, 1790

Director General and Commander-In-Chief of the Muskogee Nation
- In office 1799 – May 24, 1803

Personal details
- Born: c. 1763 Frederick County, Maryland
- Died: 1805 (aged 41–42) Castillo Morro, Havana, Spanish Cuba

Military service
- Allegiance: Great Britain; State of Muskogee
- Branch/service: British Army
- Unit: Maryland Loyalists Battalion
- Battles/wars: American Revolutionary War: Siege of Pensacola

William Augustus Bowles (c. 1763 – c. 1805) was an American-born military officer and adventurer. Born in Frederick County, Maryland, Bowles was commissioned into the Maryland Loyalists Battalion at the rank of ensign, seeing action during the American Revolutionary War, including the 1781 siege of Pensacola. He subsequently established an alliance with the Muscogee and founded the State of Muskogee. In 1803, Bowles was betrayed and handed over to the Spanish, who imprisoned him in Morro Castle, where he died two years later.

== Early life ==
Some sources give his date of birth as 1764. Bowles was born in Frederick County, Maryland, and joined the Maryland Loyalist Battalion at the age of thirteen with the junior officer rank of ensign, travelling with the battalion when it was ordered to form part of the garrison of Pensacola, Florida. Upon arrival, Bowles resigned his commission, and left the fortification, where he was captured by Muscogee raiders and brought back to one of their settlements.

While he was living with the Creek Tribe, a Spanish expeditionary force mustered and began to lay siege to British forts along the Gulf Coast. Bowles convinced the Creeks to support the British garrison stationed in Pensacola against the invading Spanish force, but the garrison surrendered when the powder magazine at the fortress was hit by artillery fire from a Spanish warship. The survivors of the garrison were taken as prisoners of war, but Bowles escaped into the wilderness with his Creek allies. This occurred May 9, 1781, when Bowles was either 16 or 17 years old.

After this battle, he was reinstated in the British Army and went to the Bahamas. After a few months there, the Governor of the Bahamas, Lord Dunmore, sent Bowles back among the Muscogee with a mission to establish a trading house among them. Bowles established a trading post along the Chattahoochee River. He married two wives, one Cherokee and the other a daughter of the Hitchiti Muscogee chieftain, William Perryman, and used this union as the basis for his claim to exert political influence among the Muscogee, later styling himself "Director General of the Muskogee Nation". Interracial marriages were common among the Seminoles and Muscogee according to historian James Leitch Wright, but historian Kevin Mulroy disagrees strongly with Wright's contention.

== Later life and death ==
After retiring from the army at half-pay, Bowles returned to the Floridas to live amongst the Creeks until 1785, when he left for New Providence in the Bahamas. A trading firm in nearby Nassau, who sought to break the Panton, Leslie & Company's monopoly in Florida, decided to employ Bowles thanks to his knowledge of territory and his good standing with the tribes and, more specifically, the Creek leader Alexander McGillivray.

In June 1788, Bowles was sent to Florida. By the end of the year, the men he had brought with him from New Providence had deserted, and he found himself named a fugitive by the Spanish. Despite the massive failure of his mission, Bowles was not about to give up and began to focus on the idea of carving out a sovereign Indian nation in Florida.

In 1795, along with the Seminoles, he formed a short-lived state in northern Florida (part of Spanish East Florida) known as the State of Muskogee, with himself as its "Director General." After designing a flag and constitution for his state, Bowles raised an army and began to carry out raids of Spanish territories in Florida. In 1800, he declared war on Spain. Bowles operated two schooners and boasted of a force of 400 frontiersmen, former slaves, and warriors.

A furious Spain offered $6,000 and 1,500 kegs of rum for his capture. When he was captured, he was transported to Madrid where he was unmoved by King Charles IV's attempts to make him change sides. He escaped, commandeered a ship and returned to the Gulf of Mexico. One of the main victims of his piratical attacks was the Scottish trading firm, Panton, Leslie & Company.

In 1803, not long after having declared himself "Chief of all Indians present" at a tribal council, he was betrayed and turned over to the Spanish. William Augustus Bowles died in 1805, at Castillo Morro, in Havana, Cuba, having deliberately starved himself to death in defiance.

== See also ==
- Wakulla County, Florida
- San Marcos de Apalache Historic State Park
