= Brian Aldridge (politician) =

American politician (1977–2024)

Member of the Mississippi House of Representatives from the 17th district
- In office January 2004 – January 5, 2016
- Succeeded by: Shane Aguirre

Personal details
- Born: May 6, 1977 Tupelo, Mississippi, U.S.
- Died: September 10, 2024 (aged 47)
- Party: Republican
- Education: Mississippi State University

Brian Aldridge (May 6, 1977 – September 10, 2024) was an American Republican politician. He served as member of the Mississippi House of Representatives from the 17th District from 2004 to 2016. He decided not to run for reelection in 2015. Aldridge died on September 10, 2024, at the age of 47.
