= John Aldridge (cricketer) =

English cricketer (born 1935)

Cricket information
- Batting: Right-handed
- Bowling: Right-arm fast-medium

Career statistics
Competition	First-class
Matches	79
Runs scored	511
Batting average	6.63
100s/50s	0/0
Top score	24*
Balls bowled	12,891
Wickets	256
Bowling average	23.56
5 wickets in innings	7
10 wickets in match	0
Best bowling	6/26
Catches/stumpings	33/–
- Source: CricketArchive, 1 November 2022

Keith John Aldridge (born 13 March 1935) is an English former cricketer who played first-class cricket for Worcestershire in England and for Tasmania in Australia. He was born in Evesham, Worcestershire.

Aldridge was a right-arm fast-medium bowler who took more than 250 first-class wickets. As a right-handed tail-end batsman he offered little, with a career batting average of under seven. His career in England was marked by controversy over his bowling action, though he later bowled in Australia without incident.

== Early cricket career ==
Aldridge debuted for Worcestershire during the 1956 season, in a game against Sussex, and took two wickets with his bowling in the first innings. Towards the end of the season he played fairly regularly as illness and injury kept the two front-line faster bowlers, Jack Flavell and Len Coldwell, out of the side, and he finished his first season with 34 wickets at an average of 24.00. He was, said Wisden Cricketers' Almanack in its review of the Worcestershire season in 1956, "a tall young player with plenty of pace [and] showed sufficient promise to ease any worries about the opening bowling".

Aldridge's record in the 1957 season was very similar, though in an unsuccessful season for Worcestershire he headed the county's bowling averages. In 1958, Coldwell was out of form, and from mid-season Aldridge played regularly and again headed the county's bowling averages, taking 60 wickets at an average of 16.80. The total included Aldridge's first five-wicket hauls and the six wickets for 26 runs he took in Sussex's only innings of a rain-ruined game proved to be the best bowling figures of his career.

== Controversy ==
Aldridge was capped by Worcestershire in 1959, and was used alongside Derek Pearson and Coldwell as a regular seam attack to support Flavell. Aldridge had his best season in terms of wickets, taking 68 wickets at an average of 23.63. Worcestershire's bowling attack, however, proved controversial as in different matches first Pearson and then Aldridge were no-balled by the leading umpire Syd Buller for throwing the ball; Buller was a leading figure in a campaign in the 1959 and 1960 seasons to eradicate throwing from first-class cricket following the controversial tour of Australia in 1958–59. Pearson's bowling action had been subject to scrutiny before (he was no-balled for throwing in 1954 as well), but Aldridge was then no-balled twice in the game against Leicestershire at Kidderminster.

At the start of the following season, 1960, Aldridge was again no-balled for throwing by umpire Jack Crapp in a game against Glamorgan at Pontypridd. Contemporary opinion appears to have been divided about the legality of Aldridge's bowling action: where other bowlers such as Tony Lock, Harold Rhodes, Pearson and the South African Geoff Griffin were suspect through physique or technique, Aldridge was a borderline offender. "There is no true identity of opinion," said an article by the cricket correspondent of The Times early in the 1960 season before the issue came to a head with the no-balling of Griffin in the Lord's Test. "Some, for instance, say that Aldridge, of Worcestershire, throws, others that he does not." In any case, as a bowler, Aldridge was much less effective in 1960 than he had been previously, his 40 wickets costing almost 30 runs apiece. Also, the emergence of left-arm orthodox spinners Doug Slade and Norman Gifford changed the balance of the Worcestershire bowling attack away from its dependence on seam bowling. Aldridge left the Worcestershire staff at the end of the 1960 season.

== Later cricket ==
Aldridge subsequently moved to Australia where he played cricket for Tasmania in several first-class and non-first-class matches between 1961–62 and 1963–64.
