= John W. Aldridge =

American writer (1922–2007)

- Born: John Watson Aldridge; September 26, 1922; Sioux City, Iowa, United States
- Died: February 7, 2007 (aged 84); Madison, Georgia, United States
- Education: University of Tennessee at Chattanooga (1940–1943); Middlebury College (1942); University of California at Berkeley (1947)
- Occupations: Writer, critic, essayist, professor
- Spouse: Patsy Aldridge
- Writing career
- Notable works: After the Lost Generation, In Search of Heresy: American Literature in an Age of Conformity
- Notable awards: Rockefeller Foundation Fellowship (1976)

John W. Aldridge (September 26, 1922 – February 7, 2007) was an American writer, literary critic, teacher and scholar. He was a professor of English at the University of Michigan, director of the Hopwood Program, and USIA Special Ambassador to Germany.

== Literary influence ==
Aldridge wrote assessments of postwar American writers. His preferred métier, inherited from Edmund Wilson and sharply differentiated from the specialized academic criticism that dominated his era, was what he called "the long, analytical essay-review". Gore Vidal noted Aldridge was mostly concerned with "values" in Aldridge's critical book After the Lost Generation.

Using American modernist writing of the 1920s as his lofty standard, Aldridge wrote of the creative dilemmas faced by those writers who arrived on the literary scene a generation later, yet still hoped to create fresh depictions of their experience. Reviewing new work as it appeared, he could be merciless in his evisceration of those who, in his view, failed to measure up. As he wrote memorably in 1951, the new writers "have learned that after the innovators come the specialists and after the specialists the imitators and that after a movement has spent itself there can only come the incestuous, the archaeologists, and the ghouls."

Reviewing After the Lost Generation, Malcolm Cowley noted Aldridge's hostile judgments on the novelists of World War II. Aldridge himself said, "Perhaps for reasons of innate perverseness, I seem always to have functioned best in an adversary position … . This has been especially true of my evaluations of various writers whose reputations seemed to me to have become inordinately enlarged and upon whom I saw it as my sacred duty to perform a deflating operation." No one came in for more deflation than William Styron, whose work Aldridge regarded as derivative and cliché-ridden.

Aldridge's work includes one of the first favorable notices of Joseph Heller's novel Something Happened and several essays on the creative strengths of Norman Mailer. Mailer remarked of Aldridge, "I wonder if there ever was a critic who understood any better the roots of the problems that beset novelists of his own generation."

Aldridge's impact is still felt. Peter Anastas has written a moving account of hearing Aldridge speak at Bowdoin College in the mid-1950s. According to Anastas, who was then an 18-year-old student, "I left Aldridge's talk reeling." Aldridge had advised young writers in the audience to depart the academy in order to gain life experience and artistic authenticity. "A friend, with whom I had published in the college literary magazine, dropped out immediately and hitchhiked to New York, where he got a job and began living and writing in the Village, subsequently producing a remarkable series of plays. Another classmate left in June, heading for San Francisco...". Anastas himself stayed in college, but was powerfully influenced to become a writer and critic. "[H]ad it not been for hearing John Aldridge speak in 1956, and having then discovered his books, I would not be writing today."

== Bibliography ==
- After the Lost Generation: A Critical Study of the Writers of Two Wars. (1951)
- Critiques and Essays on Modern Fiction, 1920–1951; representing the achievement of modern American and British critics; with a foreword by Mark Schorer. (1952)
- In Search of Heresy; American Literature in an Age of Conformity. (1956)
- Party at Cranton. (1960)
- Time to Murder and Create: the Contemporary Novel in Crisis. (1966)
- In the Country of the Young. (1970)
- Devil in the Fire; retrospective essays on American literature and culture, 1951–1971. (1972)
- The American Novel and the Way We Live Now. (1983)
- Classics & Contemporaries. (1992)
- Talents and Technicians: Literary Chic and the New Assembly-line Fiction. (1992)
