= A. Owen Aldridge =

American academic

Alfred Owen Aldridge (December 16, 1915 – January 29, 2005) was a professor of French and comparative literature, founder-editor of the journal Comparative Literature Studies, and author of books on a wide range of literature studies.

== Career ==
He was born in Buffalo, New York on December 16, 1915. He was awarded degrees by Indiana University, the University of Georgia for his M.S., and Duke University, where he took his Ph.D. In 1952-1953 he started the Fulbright Program in France, which led to his undertaking a second doctorate, at the University of Paris, on the subject of "La Littérature Comparée" (1955). After his doctorates, he was employed in the department of English at the University of Maryland, then became professor of French and comparative literature at the University of Illinois in 1967.

He published widely and became well known as a pioneer of colonial American literary studies and as an explorer of east–west literary relations. He spoke four modern language, having mastered Japanese in his sixties, and was also proficient in Latin. He served as president of the American Comparative Literature Association. In 1963 together with Melvin J. Friedman he founded the journal Comparative Literature Studies, which he edited or co-edited for many years. He retired in 1986 and died on January 29, 2005.

== Legacy ==
The A. Owen Aldridge Prize was established in his memory.

== Honors ==
Following his retirement his lifetime's work was awarded the unusual honor by his colleagues of three festschrifts:

- J. A. Leo Lemay, ed. (1987). Deism, Masonry and the Enlightenment: Essays Honoring Alfred Owen Aldridge. University of Delaware Press.
- François Jost; Melvin J. Friedman, eds. (1990). Aesthetics and the literature of ideas: essays in honor of A. Owen Aldridge. University of Delaware Press. ISBN 9780874133639.
- Masayuki Akiyama; Yiu-nam Leung, eds. (1997). Crosscurrents in the Literatures of Asia and the West: Essays in Honor of A. Owen Aldridge. University of Delaware Press. ISBN 9780874136395.

== Works ==
- Aldridge, Alfred Owen (1951). Shaftesbury and the Deist Manifesto. American Philosophical Society.
- —— (1959). Man of Reason: The Life of Thomas Paine. Lippincott.
- —— (1965). Benjamin Franklin, Philosopher & Man. Lippincott.
- —— (1966). Jonathan Edwards. Washington Square Press.
- —— (1967). Benjamin Franklin and Nature's God. Duke University Press.
- —— (1969). Comparative Literature: Matter and Method. University of Illinois Press. ISBN 9780252000164.
- —— (1971). The Ibero-American Enlightenment. University of Illinois Press.
- —— (1975). Voltaire and the Century of Light. Princeton University Press.
- —— (1976). Franklin and his French Contemporaries. Greenwood Press.
- —— (1982). Early American Literature: A Comparatist Approach. Princeton University Press.
- —— (1984). Thomas Paine's American Ideology. University of Delaware Press. ISBN 9780874132601.
- —— (1986). The Re-emergence of World Literature: a Study of Asia and the West. University of Delaware Press. ISBN 9780874132779.
- —— (1993). The Dragon and the Eagle: the Presence of China in the American Enlightenment. Wayne State University Press. ISBN 9780814324554.
