= John Aldridge (RAF officer) =

British World War I flying ace

John Arthur Aldridge
- Born: 9 February 1899; Graveley, Hertfordshire
- Died: November 1988 (aged 89); North East Hampshire, Hampshire
- Military career
- Allegiance: United Kingdom
- Branch: Royal Flying Corps
- Service years: 1917–1919
- Rank: Lieutenant
- Unit: No. 19 Squadron RAF
- Conflicts: World War I; World War II
- Awards: Order of the British Empire; Belgian Croix de Guerre
- Other work: Served in Air Training Corps during the Second World War; Secretary at the Veterinary Laboratory near Woking

Lieutenant John Arthur Aldridge MBE (9 February 1899 – November 1988) was a First World War flying ace credited with five aerial victories. He returned to the colours during the Second World War, joining the Air Training Corps.

Aldridge joined the Royal Flying Corps as an officer cadet, and was made a temporary second lieutenant on 24 May 1917. He received Royal Aero Club Aviator's Certificate 4846 on a Maurice Farman biplane at Ruislip on 16 June 1917. He was posted to No. 19 Squadron in early 1918, where he scored five victories flying the Sopwith Dolphin between April and September. He officially left the RAF on 12 January 1919.

On 18 June 1919, Alridge joined the Board of Agriculture and Fisheries as an Assistant Clerk (Abstractor).

During Second World War, he served in the Training Branch of the RAF, with the rank of pilot officer, until 31 March 1945.

He became Secretary at the Veterinary Laboratory near Woking, and in December 1948 was appointed a Member of the Order of the British Empire for his work in the Civil Service.
