= Philip Key =

Philip Key may refer to:

- Philip Key (American politician) (1750–1820), U.S. Representative from Maryland, 1791–1792
- Philip Barton Key (1757–1815), U.S. Representative from Maryland, 1807–1812, cousin of the above
- Philip Barton Key II (1818–1859), American lawyer and murder victim, great-nephew of the above
