= Senator McGill (disambiguation) =

George McGill (Kansas politician) (1879–1963) was a U.S. Senator from Kansas from 1930 to 1939.

Senator McGill may also refer to:

- Amanda McGill (born 1980), Nebraska State Senate
- Andrew Ryan McGill (1840–1905), Minnesota State Senate
- Paddy McGill (1913–1977), Northern Irish Senate
- Yancey McGill (born 1952), South Carolina State Senate

== See also ==
- Charles Magill (Virginia judge) (1759–1827), Virginia State Senate
