= Campbell of Strachur =

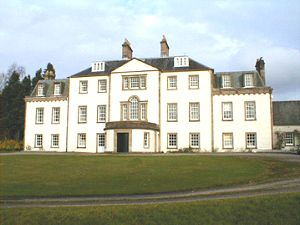
Strachur House

The Campbells of Strachur, also known as the MacArthur Campbells of Strachur, may be the oldest branch of the Clan Campbell. The family traces its descent from Sir Arthur Campbell, who is said to have been a son of Duncan Dubh, who in turn may have been an elder brother of Gilleasbaig, who was in turn the father of the patrilineal-ancestor of the chiefs of Clan Campbell. The heads of the Strachur family were known in Gaelic as Mac Artairr, "son of Arthur", in reference to their alleged ancestry. The head of the family bears the Gaelic title MacArtair Strachuirr.

== Chiefs of Clan Campbell ==
The historian William Forbes Skene, who maintained that the Strachur family of Campbells were ancestors of the chiefs of Clan Campbell, writes:

... the Macarthur Campbells, of Strachur, the acknowledged descendants of the older house, they have at all times disputed the chiefship with the Argyll family. Judging from analogy, we are compelled to admit that the Campbells of Strachur must formerly have been chiefs of the clan, and that the usual causes in such cases have operated to reduce the Strachur family, and to place that of Argyll in that situation, and this is confirmed by the early history of the clan.

== See also ==
- Clan Arthur, the MacArthers of Terivadich are commonly confused with the Campbells of Strachur
- John Campbell, of Strachur
