= Clan Arthur =

Highland Scottish clan

- Clann Artair
- Crest: Two laurel branches in orle Proper
- Motto: Fide et Opera
- Slogan: Eisd, o Eisd!

Profile
- District: Argyll
- Plant badge: Wild Thyme

Chief
- John Alexander MacArthur of that Ilk
- The Chief of Clan Arthur

Clan Arthur or Clan MacArthur, (Scottish Gaelic: Clann Artair) is a highland Scottish clan that once held lands on the shores of Loch Awe opposite Inishail. The clan has been described as one of the oldest clans in Argyll. Clan Arthur and Clan Campbell share a common origin, and at one point the MacArthurs challenged the seniority of the leading Campbell family. A branch of MacArthurs from the Isle of Skye were a sept of the MacDonalds of Sleat, and were hereditary pipers for the MacDonalds of the Isles. In late 18th century the chief of the clan died without an heir, leaving the clan leaderless until the late 20th century. In 2002, the first chief of Clan Arthur (James Macarthur) was recognised in about 230 years.

== History ==
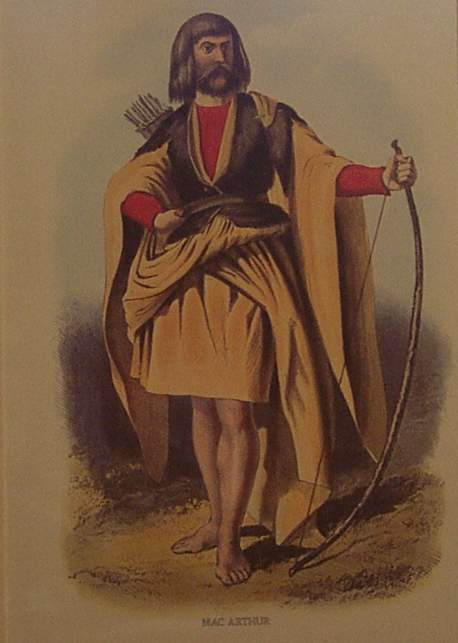
Mac Arthur by Robert Ronald McIan, from Logan's Highland Clans (1845).

=== Early history ===
During the reign of Alexander III (r. 1249-1286), the Clan Campbell made its first appearance, and was divided into two branches; Mac Cailinmor and Mac Arthur. The nineteenth century historian William F. Skene wrote that during the reign of Robert I (r.1306–1329), the Mac Cailinmor branch (descendants of Colin Mor Campbell) did not possess any land in what is now Argyll, while Mac Arthur, head of the Mac Arthur branch was in possession of extensive territory in the earldom Garmoran, which was the original seat of the Campbells. Skene wrote that "it is therefore impossible to doubt that Mac Arthur was at this time the head of the clan, and this position he appears to have maintained until the reign of James I of Scotland."

Arthur Campbell, of the Mac Arthur branch, along with Neil Campbell, of the Mac Cailinmor branch, supported Robert the Bruce and were richly rewarded by the king with the forfeited lands of his opponents. Arthur Campbell was made keeper of Dunstaffnage Castle along with extensive territory in the district of Lorne. Later, during the reign of David II, the Mac Cailinmor ever becoming more powerful, since the marriage of Sir Neil Campbell with a sister of Robert I, were resisted from taking control of the clan by the Mac Arthur branch with the obtaining of a charter "Arthuro Campbell quod nulli subjictur pro terris nisi regi," by Arthur Campbell.["Arthur Campbell that he is subject to no one for the lands but the king"]

In 1427 James I held parliament at Inverness and summoned the Highland chiefs. Iain MacArthur, the chief of the MacArthurs, was one of the unlucky chiefs who were beheaded by the king of Scots. This chief had been described as "a great prince among his own people and leader of a thousand men". (Note: "princeps magnus apud suos et dux mille hominum".) With the execution of Iain MacArthur, and Alexander, Lord of Garmoran, the MacArthurs lost possession of all their lands with the exception of Strachur and lands of Glenfalloch and Glen Dochart in Perthshire. From this time, and on, the Mac Cailinmor branch were the head of the clan and the Campbells continued their rise in power.

=== Modern history ===
In 1771 Patrick MacArthur, chief of Clan Arthur, died in Jamaica without a male heir. With his death, the official title of Chief of Clan Arthur ceased to exist. In 1986 senior members of Clan Arthur hired a genealogist to trace back through the last chief's family tree to find a living representative with a common ancestor to the chiefs of Clan Arthur. Genealogical research concluded that the chiefly line of the MacArthurs, the MacArthurs of Tirivadich could be traced as far back as 1495, to a John MacArthur of Tirivadich. The MacArthur chiefly line was traced nine generations down from this John MacArthur of Tirivadich, through his eldest grandson: Duncan MacArthur of Tirivadich; and three generations through John MacArthur of Tirivadich's younger grandsons: Niall MacArthur of Querlane and John MacArthur of Drissaig. Research showed that the main line had become extinct, however a living descendant through John MacArthur of Drissaig was found – a Canadian born man named James Edward Moir MacArthur. This man traced his descent from a Margaret MacArthur Moir, who died about 1775. A great nephew of hers, Archibald MacArthur Stewart, recorded Arms in 1775 and traced his descent from John MacArthur of Milton, who died in 1674. The genealogical research conducted on behalf of Clan Arthur linked this John MacArthur of Milton back to John MacArthur of Drissaig.

In 1991 a derbfine was organised by armigers of the clan. There it was determined that James Edward Moir MacArthur of Milton should petition the Lord Lyon to be appointed Clan Commander of Clan Arthur. Ten years later he did so, successfully, and in August 2002 was recognised James Edward Moir MacArthur of that Ilk as the rightful heir to the arms of MacArthur of Tirivadich, and that he was entitled to the chiefship of Clan Arthur. Later in April 2003, he was officially inaugurated by clan members as Chief of Clan Arthur. He was the first official chief of the clan in about 230 years. Upon his death in 2004, he was succeeded as chief by his son, John Alexander MacArthur of that Ilk. The current chief of Clan Arthur represents the clan as a member of the Standing Council of Scottish Chiefs.

== Tartans ==
| Tartan image | Notes |
|---|---|
| | The MacArthur of Milton Hunting tartan is similar to Campbell tartans, and is considered the oldest MacArthur tartan. |
| | MacArthur tartan as published in the Vestiarium Scoticum of 1842. The Vestiarium is the source of many of today's tartans and has been proven to be a Victorian hoax. |

== Clan symbols ==
The current chief of Clan Arthur is John Alexander MacArthur of that Ilk. The chief bears the undifferenced arms of the name MacArthur, and is the only person legally entitled to these arms under Scots law. The blazon of the chief's armorial shield is Azure, three antique crowns Or and corresponds to one of the attributed arms of the legendary King Arthur. A modern crest badge, suitable for wear by a member of Clan Arthur contains the chief's heraldic crest and heraldic motto. The chief's crest is two branches of bay in orle, proper. The chief's heraldic motto is FIDE ET OPERA which translates from Latin as "by fidelity and work" or "by faith and work". The chief's slogan is EISD O EISD which translates from Scottish Gaelic to "Listen!, O Listen!". Several clan badges have been attributed to Clan Arthur. These include: Wild Thyme .

There are several tartans attributed to the MacArthurs. The most commonly used tartan today is the MacArthur tartan and was first published in the Vestiarium Scoticum in 1842. The Vestiarium was the work of the dubious "Sobieski Stuarts" and has been proven to be a forgery and a hoax. A group of MacArthurs from the Isle of Skye were hereditary pipers to the MacDonalds, and this tartan shares the same basic form of the MacDonald, Lord of the Isles tartan. Another MacArthur tartan is the MacArthur of Milton Hunting tartan. This tartan is considered the elder of MacArthur tartans and is similar to the Campbell tartan. The source of this tartan is Wilson's '1823' Sample Book.

== See also ==
- Campbell of Strachur
