= List of mayors of Winchester, Virginia =

Mayors of the city of Winchester, Virginia, USA

The following is a list of mayors of the city of Winchester, Virginia, USA. Winchester is in Frederick County.

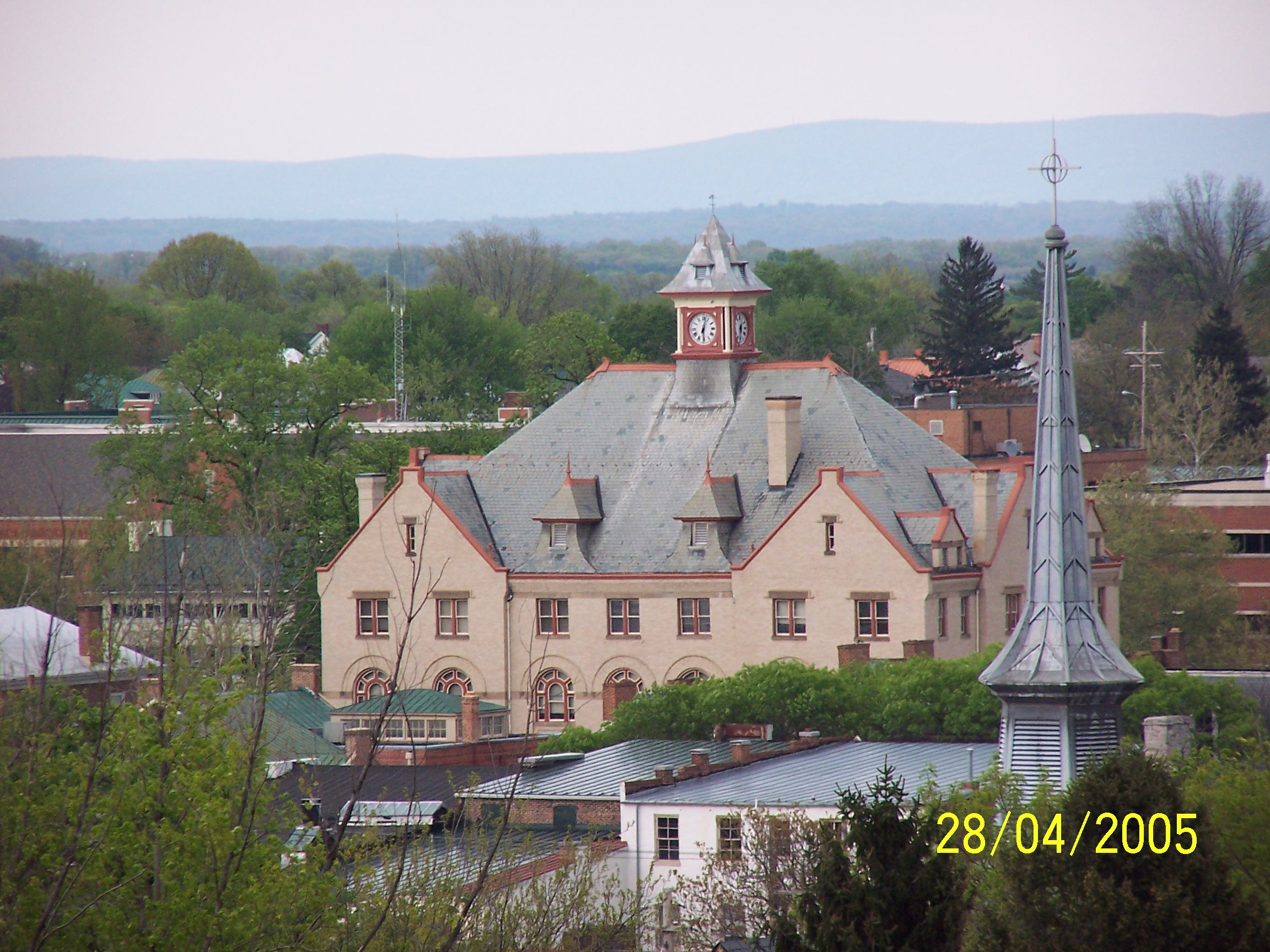
View of Winchester City Hall in Virginia, US, in 2005

- Lewis Wolf, 1804, 1806
- Charles Magill, 1805
- Chas. Brent, 1807, 1809
- Beatty Carson, 1808, 1810
- Joseph Gamble, 1811
- Jas. P. Riely, 1843
- Geo. W. Seevers, ca.1847
- Joseph H. Shearard, ca.1865
- Robt. Y. Conrad, ca.1866
- Geo. W. Ginn, 1868
- Lewis N. Huck, 1870
- J. B. T. Reed, 1872-1876
- Wm. L. Clark, ca.1884
- John J. Williams, ca.1886
- F. A. Graichen, 1886
- Wm. Atkinson, 1888
- Wm. R. Alexander, 1890
- T. N. Lupton, 1891-1896
- Jno. J. Williams, 1896-1898
- Robert T. Barton, 1899-1902
- Wm. C. Graichen, 1902
- Harry H. Baker, ca.1904
- Julian F. Ward, ca.1927
- C. R. Anderson, ca.1937
- M. B. Clowe Jr., ca.1953-1956
- Charles “Charlie” Zuckerman, 1980-1988
- Elizabeth “Betsy” Helm, 1988-1992
- Gary Chrisman, 1992-1996
- Larry Omps, 1996-2004
- Elizabeth Minor, ca.2004-2016
- John David Smith Jr., 2016–2024
- Les Veach, 2024-present.

== See also ==
- Winchester history
