= Woodley Mansion =

Historic mansion in Washington, DC, USA

Coordinates: 38.9285°N 77.0602°W

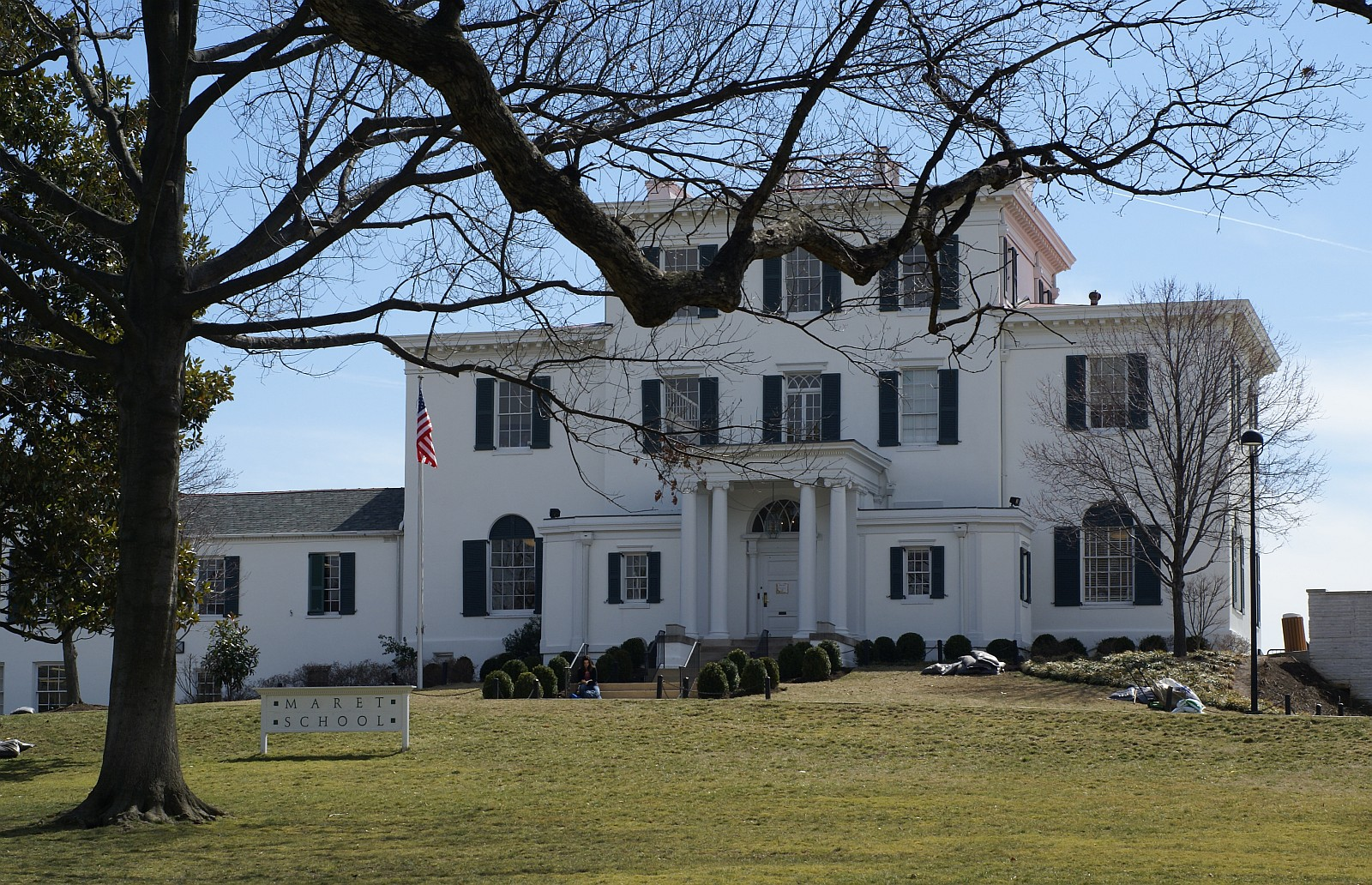
Woodley

Woodley is a Federal-style hilltop house in Washington, D.C., constructed in 1801. It has served as the home to Grover Cleveland, Martin Van Buren, and Henry L. Stimson, and is now the home of the Maret School.

== History ==
The land on which the house now stands was once owned by Colonel Ninian Beall, a Scottish immigrant whose 795-acre tract stretched from the Potomac River to the future site of the Woodley Mansion. Some of the land, including the future site of the mansion, was purchased in the early 1790s by Benjamin Stoddert and Uriah Forrest, at the request of George Washington, to prevent it from being bought up by speculators who would then have sold it to the government for huge prices.

In 1797, the 250-acre (101 ha) wooded estate was purchased by Phillip Barton Key, the uncle of the author of "The Star Spangled Banner," Francis Scott Key.

In 1801, Key commissioned the Federal-style design based on the Woodley Lodge in Reading, England. The word "Woodley" means "clearing in the woods."

In 1938, Henry Stimson gave Woodley to his alma mater Phillips Academy, Andover, though he and his wife continued to live there. In 1950, Andover sold the house and grounds to the private Maret School.

In 1952, Maret moved to the new campus from its 1923 building at 2118 Kalorama Road NW. Maret has used the house as a learning center, a library, a business office, admissions office, and the head of school's office.

== Residents ==
Over the years, many prominent people have lived in the house, including:

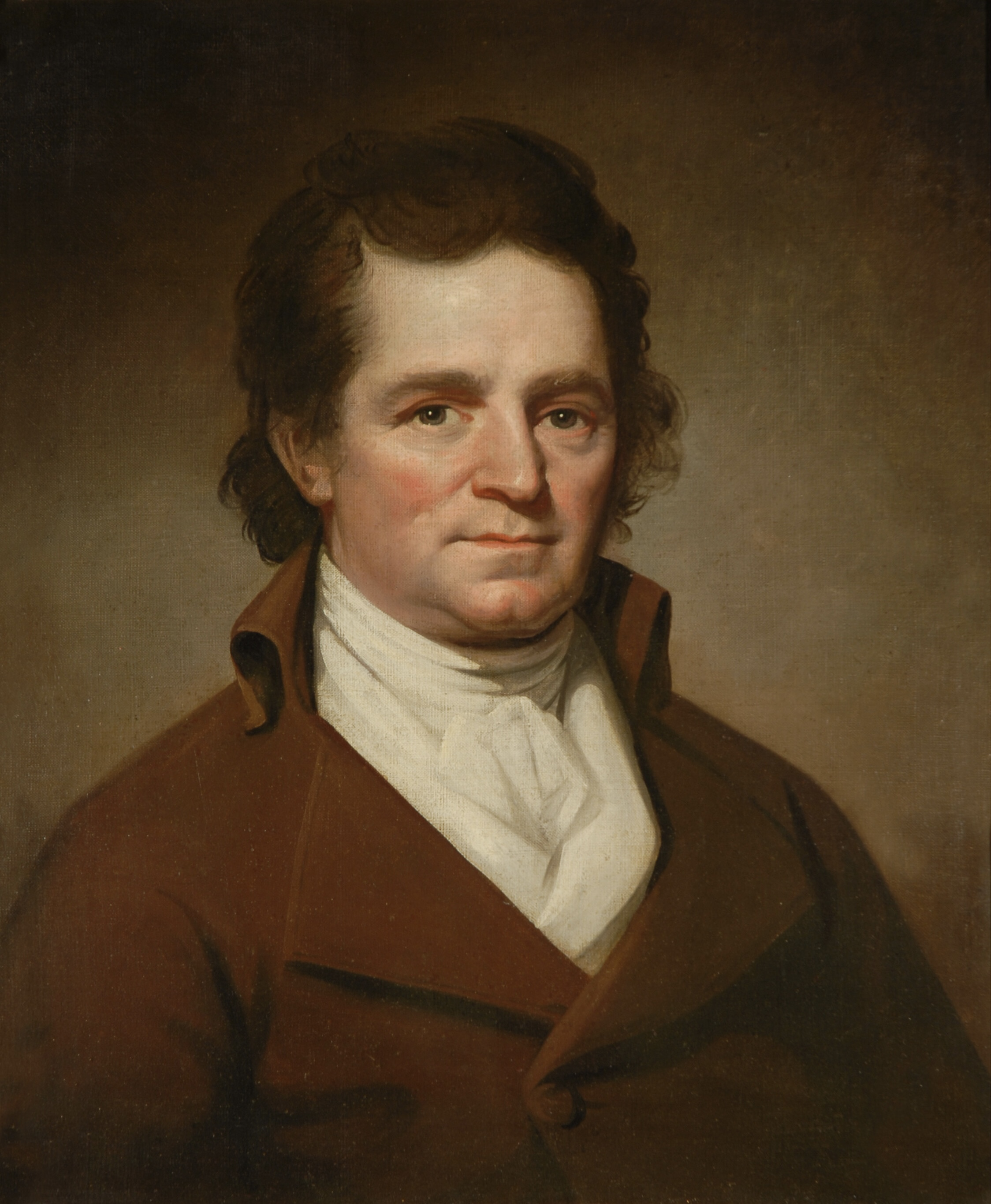
Philip Barton Key, the creator of Woodley.

=== Philip Barton Key ===
Philip Barton Key, born into a prominent family of Maryland planters, sacrificed his inheritance to fight for a Loyalist regiment in the American Revolution. He was eventually captured, paroled, and sent to England, where he studied law at the Middle Temple of the Inns at Court. While there, he visited Prime Minister Henry Addington at the Woodley Lodge. When Key returned to Washington, D.C., he modeled his own home after the original lodge in England.

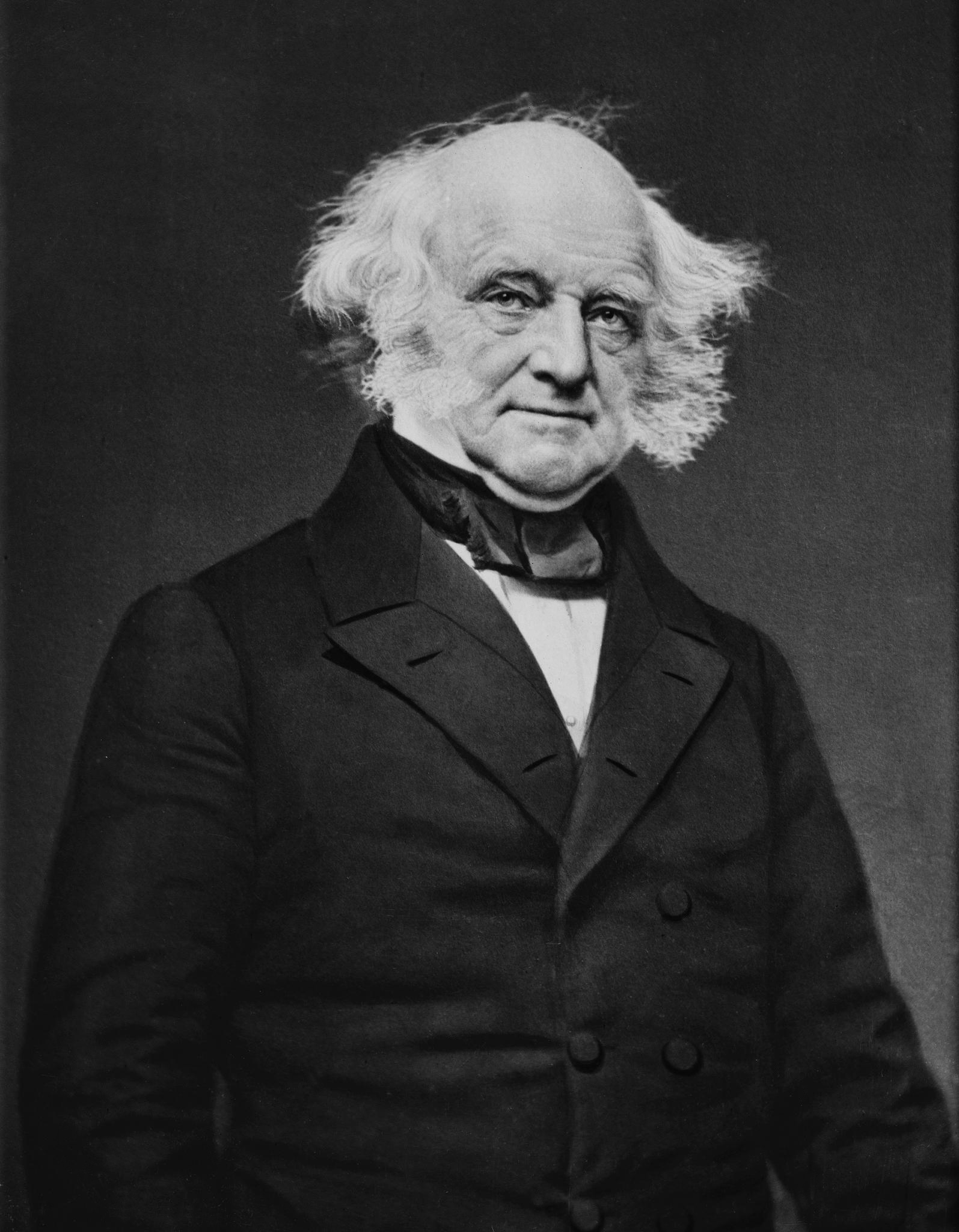
Martin Van Buren, eighth President of the United States, lived in Woodley as a summer home.

=== Martin Van Buren ===
Martin Van Buren served as a U.S. senator from New York, then as Andrew Jackson's vice president before ascending to the presidency in 1837. As he entered office, the country was plunged into its first depression so he could not do what all his predecessors had done: move away from the heat of Washington during the summer. Instead, he rented Woodley because it was on cooler heights above the city and because it was considerably cheaper to run.

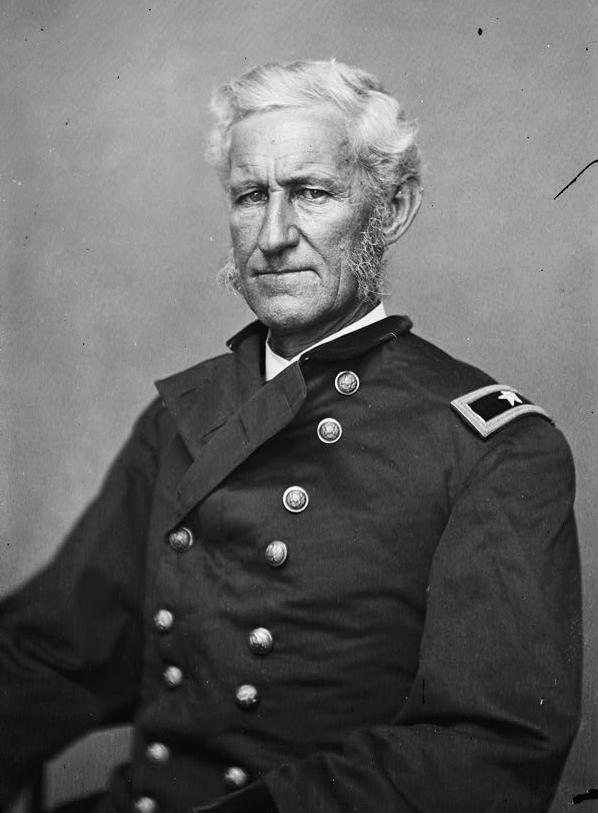
Lorenzo Thomas, a Civil War general, lived at Woodley.

=== Lorenzo Thomas ===
Lorenzo Thomas, a Union general, played a number of roles during the Civil War era. As Adjutant General, he watched the siege of Vicksburg beside General Ulysses S. Grant aboard the ironclad USS Magnolia. Later in the war, he raised 21,000 black troops in Mississippi. During an assignment in the West, it is believed, he rented Woodley to former President James Buchanan. After the war, Thomas served briefly as Secretary of War and was a key player in the impeachment trial of Andrew Johnson. In April 1862, Thomas freed the last of the Woodley slaves: Lucy Berry and her two small sons, George and Lorenzo. It is not known whether Lorenzo Thomas fathered these two sons.

=== Lucy Berry ===
Lucy Berry, the last of the Woodley slaves, was born in Charles County, Maryland, in 1822 on a tobacco plantation called Equality. In 1853, she was bought by Lorenzo Thomas and installed in Woodley as his cook and laundress. In April 1862, Lucy Berry and her two small sons were freed by the District Emancipation Act. Four years later, she was reunited with her husband Denis and her four older children, and the entire Berry family were living together in their own house in East Georgetown. After the end of Reconstruction and the death of Denis Berry, Lucy moved to the Government Hospital of the Insane (now St. Elizabeth's), where she worked as a laundress until her death.

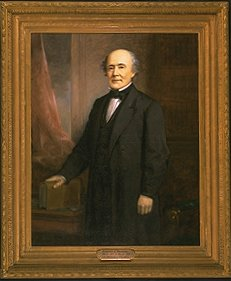
Robert J. Walker: Senator, Secretary of the Treasury, and Woodley resident.

=== Robert J. Walker ===
Robert J. Walker was a Mississippi cotton planter, U.S. Representative, and Senator before 1844, when he helped to engineer the election of James K. Polk, the first dark horse candidate elected president. Polk appointed him Secretary of the Treasury. In 1867, he helped persuade Secretary of State William Seward to purchase Alaska from Russia. To keep negotiations on track, the Czar paid Walker a $20,000 bribe, some of which funded the 1867 renovation of Woodley, which included the addition of a third floor.

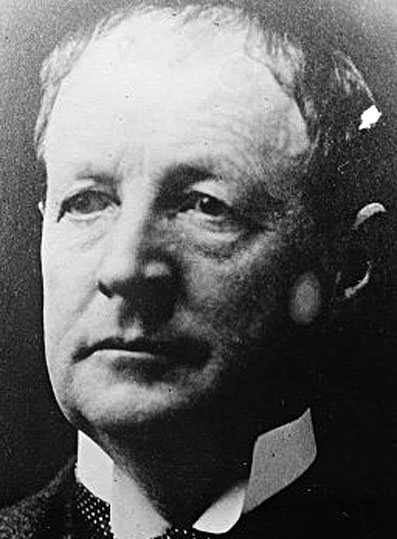
Francis Newlands shaped the character of the area around Woodley during his stay there.

=== Francis Newlands ===
Francis Newlands, a beneficiary of the Comstock Silver Mine, was both a politician and a real estate tycoon. As Senator from Nevada, he championed the Newlands Reclamation Act of 1901, which culminated in the irrigation of huge sections of the West. At the local level, he developed the suburb of Chevy Chase, boosting his land's value by extending Connecticut Avenue, building a streetcar line, and helping to create Rock Creek Park. After renting Woodley to the Clevelands in 1893, he added a block of rooms on the east side of the building and moved in himself around 1900.

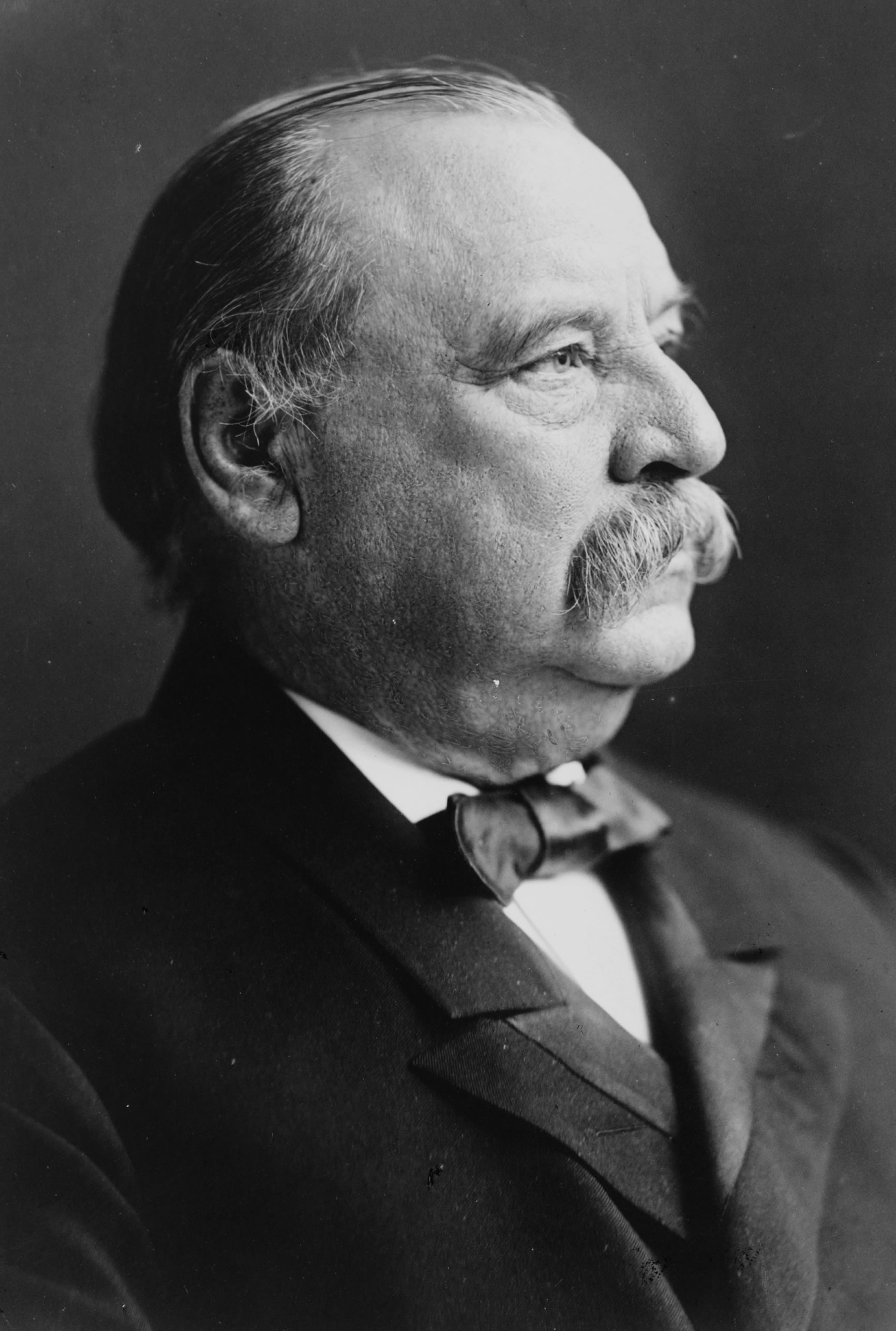
Grover Cleveland, 22nd and 24th president, lived in Woodley.

=== Grover Cleveland ===
Grover Cleveland purchased Woodley in 1886 for $21,500. At the time, it was described as "a two and one-half story stone mansion, elegantly situated on high ground, commanding a fine view of the surrounding country and to which is attached twenty nine acres of ground." His intention was to occupy the house during the summer months and at other periods of the year when he wanted to be safe from intrusion. He planned to add an additional story and a tower to the house so he could see the Potomac River as far as Mount Vernon.

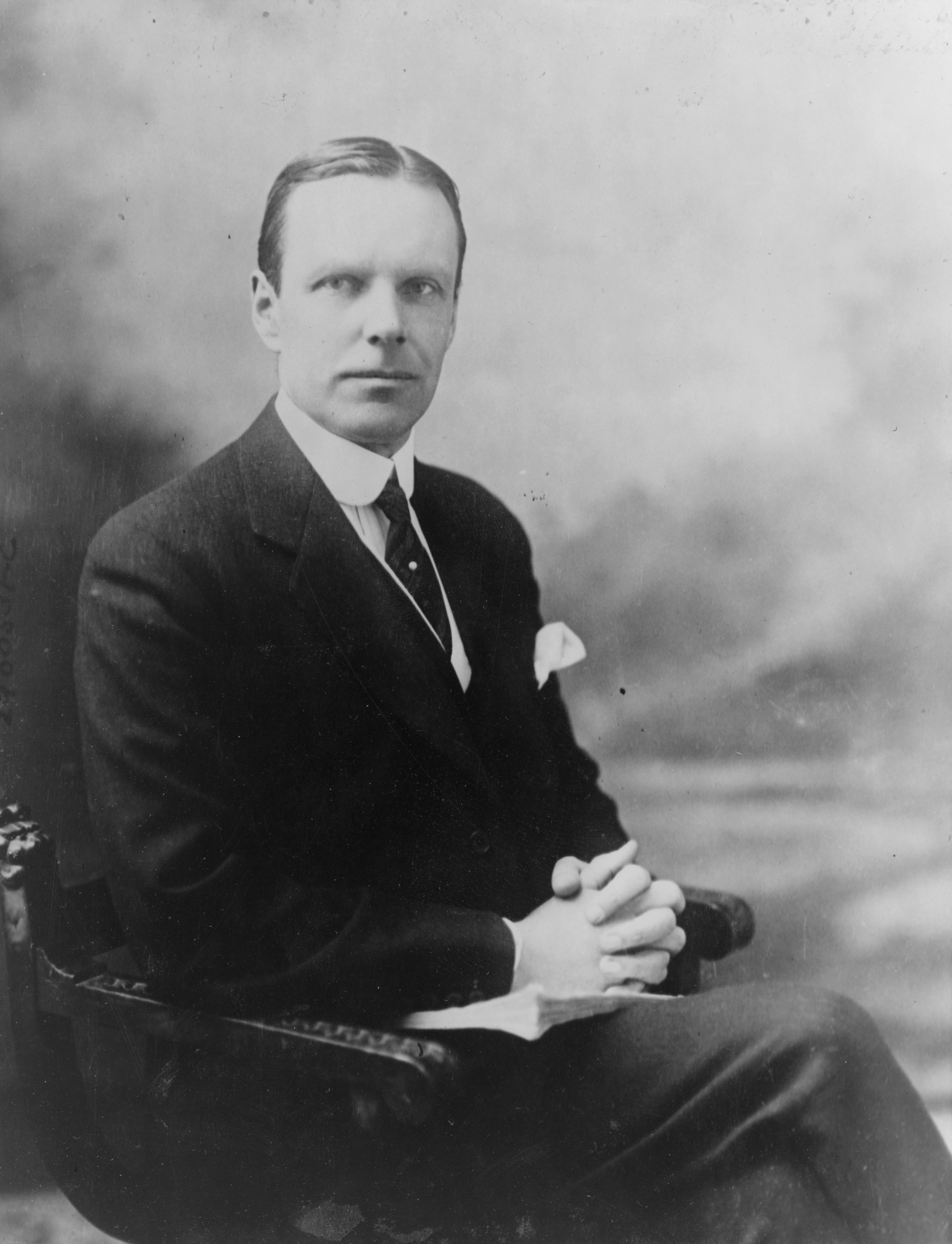
William Phillips, a diplomat and an Undersecretary of State, lived in Woodley from 1915 to 1919.

=== William Phillips ===
William Phillips was a career diplomat and a lifelong friend of Franklin Roosevelt. When he and his wife Caroline rented Woodley (1915–1919), he was Assistant Secretary of State and also the host of numerous dinners attended by the Roosevelts. Phillips went on to a career as ambassador to Belgium, Canada and Italy, where for six years, he tried to keep Mussolini's ambitions in check. He continued to serve in many vital overseas assignments under his old friend Franklin Roosevelt until his official retirement in 1944.

=== Sally Long Ellis ===
Lumber baron Robert A. Long bought the home for his daughter Sally Long Ellis in 1921. Her husband Captain Hayne Ellis had seen action in the Spanish–American War, the Philippine Insurrection and the Boxer Rebellion. Eventually promoted to Admiral, he would later become Commander of the Atlantic Squadron. Among the guests who visited Woodley during those years were General John Pershing, commander of the American Expeditionary force in World War I. When R. A. Long's company, the Long-Bell Lumber Company, suffered financial setbacks in the late 1920s, the house was sold.

=== George S. Patton ===
Major (later General) George S. Patton rented Woodley in 1928.

=== Henry L. Stimson ===
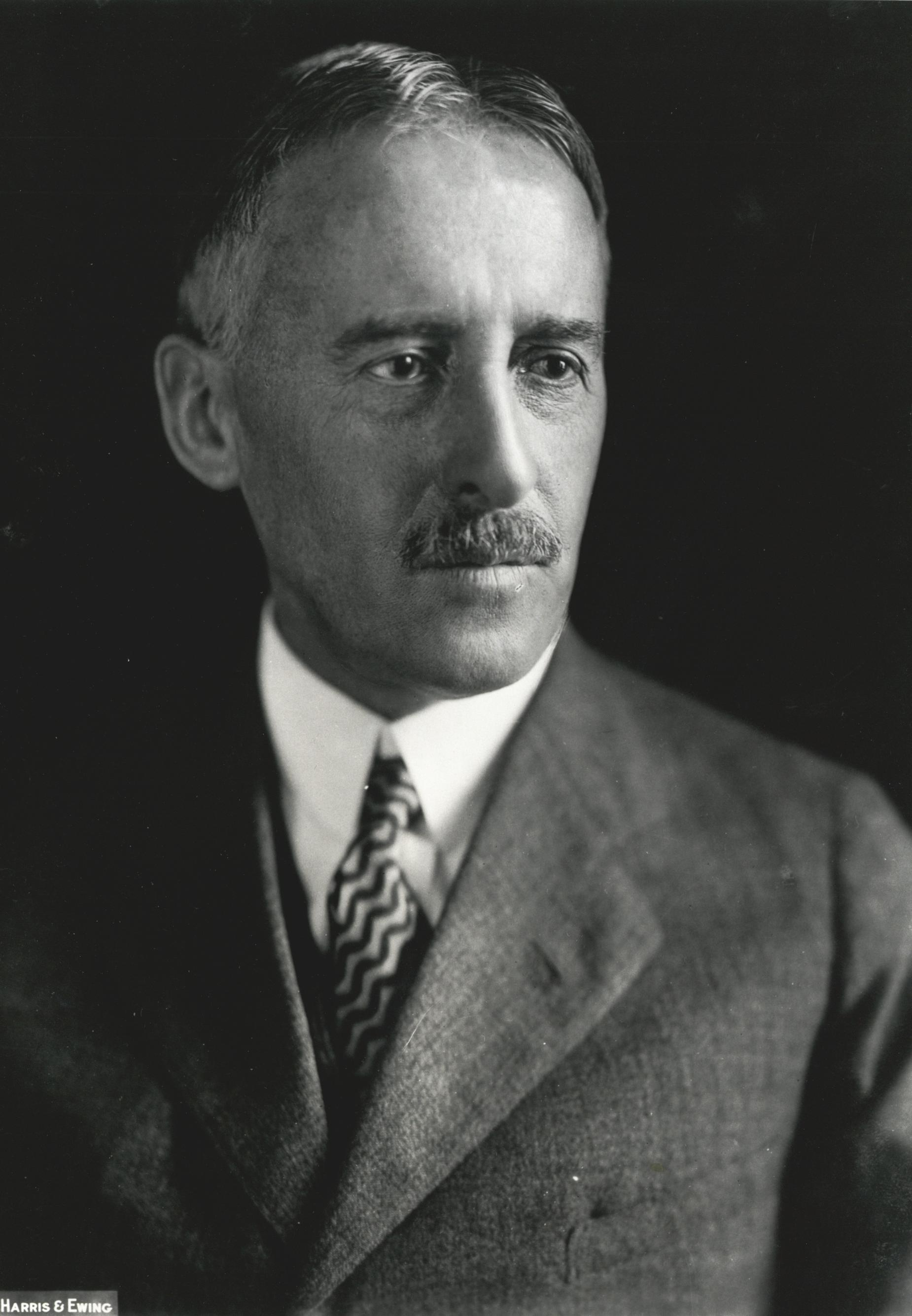
Henry L. Stimson in 1929, around the time he purchased Woodley.

Henry L. Stimson purchased Woodley in 1929, and was its last private owner-resident. He served as Secretary of State during the Hoover administration, and was the Secretary of War for both Franklin Roosevelt and Harry Truman during World War II, until his retirement in September 1945. When Stimson and his wife Mabel bought Woodley, they added cloakrooms (now little offices) on either side of the portico.

It was widely reported at the time that Stimson had paid $1,000,000 (equivalent to $18,750,000 in 2025) for Woodley, but later reports put the sale cost at around $750,000 (equivalent to $14,062,500 in 2025) or $850,000 (equivalent to $15,937,500 in 2025).

Later reports said that Stimson attempted to give Woodley to the federal government to serve as the official residence of the Secretary of State. This was unsuccessful, allegedly because it was feared that other cabinet officers would desire official homes. Stimson also reportedly offered to Andrew Mellon as the site for the National Gallery of Art if its Constitution Avenue location could not be secured. Ultimately, in May 1938, Stimson gave Woodley to his alma mater, the Phillips Academy in Andover, Massachusetts (for whom he was president of the board of trustees). He and his wife continued living in Woodley until 1947.

=== Adolf Berle ===
Adolf Berle, one of the architects of the New Deal, rented Woodley from Stimson in 1939. Once again, Woodley became the place of high drama. On the evening of September 1, Whittaker Chambers arrived at Woodley to tell Berle that Alger Hiss, a highly respected member of the State Department, was passing top-secret documents to the Soviets. That accusation would eventually culminate in the trial of Hiss. (He was found guilty of perjury and went to prison.) Among the many guests at Woodley during the Berle year was Secretary of State Cordell Hull, who would sneak away during afternoons to play croquet on the Woodley croquet lawn; Albert Einstein, who came to a Woodley reception; and Charles W. Yost, Berle's assistant, who was invited to view Julian Bryan's horrifying photographs of the Warsaw siege.

=== Maret School ===
In 1948, about a year after the Stimsons had moved out, Phillips Academy listed Woodley for sale. It languished on the market for two years until 1950, when it was sold to a private group of Washingtonians, reportedly for around $200,000 (equivalent to $2,676,349 in 2025) in cash, substantially less than its listing price of $400,000 (equivalent to $5,352,697 in 2025). From the beginning, the plan was to sell it to the Maret School in a real-estate swap for Maret's existing property on Kalorama Street and sundry other property the school held. Local residents objected strongly to the estate being used as a school, protesting both its change of character, and potential noise and traffic issues. A Citizens Emergency Committee to Save Woodley was created to lobby the city zoning board to deny Maret's use request, as well as an additional request to use add apartments to 10 acres of the estate. Initially denied their rezoning request, Maret finally received permission to operate a school in the building in June 1951, after Maret agreed to use only the first floor of the building as a school and to make no external changes to the building.

In August 1952, a "major part" of the mansion was reported destroyed in a three-alarm fire, as it was being remodeled for use in the fall semester. The damage was estimated at $100,000 (equivalent to $1,212,406 in 2025). The school opened successfully in September.

== Legacy ==
Woodley Lane (later Woodley Road) in Washington, D.C., was named after the Woodley Mansion.

The Woodley Society, founded at Maret in 1993, is an association of students, faculty, and alumni that studies the house's history. In 2008, the group's leader, historian Allerton Kilborne, published a book about Woodley. The group's podcast, Echoes of Woodley, tells stories surrounding the mansion.

== See also ==
- List of residences of presidents of the United States
