= Robert T. Barton =

American politician (1842–1917)

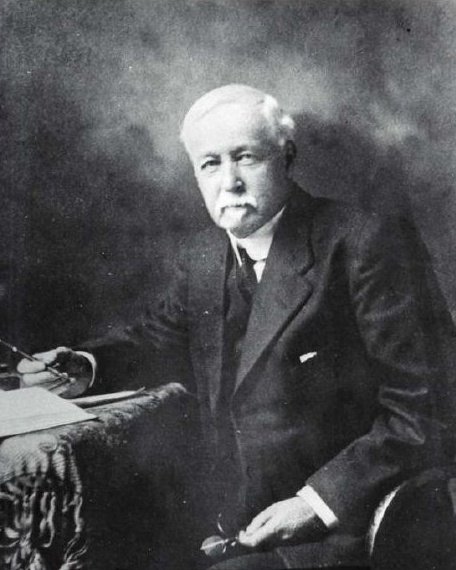
- Barton, c. 1900

Member of the Virginia House of Delegates from the Winchester and Frederick County district
- In office 1883–1884
- Preceded by: Holmes Conrad
- Succeeded by: John V. Tavenner

Personal details
- Born: Robert Thomas Barton; November 24, 1842 Winchester, Virginia, U.S.
- Died: January 17, 1917 (aged 74) Winchester, Virginia, U.S.
- Resting place: Mount Hebron Cemetery
- Spouse(s): Katie Knight (m. 1868; died 1887) Gertrude W. Baker (m. 1890)
- Children: 3
- Occupation: Politician; lawyer; writer

Robert Thomas Barton (November 24, 1842 – January 17, 1917) was a Virginia lawyer, politician and author of legal and historical books and articles, and a president of the Virginia Bar Association.

== Early life and education ==
Born in Winchester, Virginia, the fourth son and eighth of ten children born to the former Frances Lucy Jones and her husband David Walker Barton. After a private education locally as befit his class at Winchester Academy, he studied at Bloomfield Academy in Albemarle County. He then volunteered for the Confederate Army, as did his five brothers, two of whom (and two brothers-in-law) were killed in the War. Baron first served in the infantry, then the Rockbridge Artillery, and then received an assignment to the Niter and Mining Bureau, which procured saltpeter (niter) for manufacturing gunpowder.

== Career ==
After the Confederacy's surrender, Barton read law in Winchester. In September 1865, he was admitted to the bar and became one of the leading lawyers in the state. He was also author of some standard textbooks, Barton’s Law Practice and Barton’s Chancery Practice, and edited a two-volume set of the records of Virginia's colonial courts, Virginia Colonial Decisions: The Reports by Sir John Randolph and by Edward Barradall of Decisions of the General Court of Virginia, 1728-1741, "which has been a landmark reference work for mid-eighteenth century Virginia since its first printing in 1909."

Barton served as a member of the Virginia House of Delegates from 1883 to 1884, representing Winchester and Frederick County. He was mayor of Winchester from 1899 to 1903, and sat as chair or president on several state and local organizations. His term as president of The Virginia Bar Association was 1892-93. He was made president of the Farmers and Merchants National Bank of Winchester in 1902.

== Personal life ==
Barton married twice. In 1868 he married Katie Knight (d. 1887) of Cecil County, Maryland, who bore no surviving children. In 1890 Barton remarried, to Gertrude W. Baker, who was nearly three decades younger than he, and bore three children, of whom a son and daughter survived to adulthood.

== Death and legacy ==
Barton died at his home on January 17, 1917, and was buried in Winchester's historic Mount Hebron Cemetery.

== See also ==
- List of mayors of Winchester, Virginia
