= John Campbell of Strachur =

British Army officer

General John Campbell of Strachur
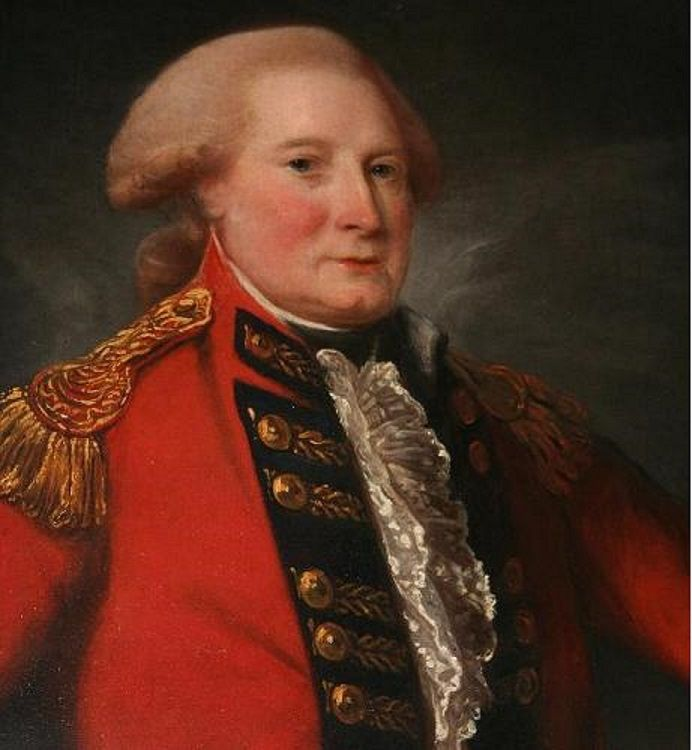
- 1790 portrait of Campbell
- Born: 1727; Argyll, Scotland
- Died: 28 August 1806 (aged 78 or 79); Argyll, Scotland
- Military career
- Allegiance: Great Britain; United Kingdom
- Branch: British Army
- Rank: General
- Commands: Commander-in-Chief, North America
- Conflicts: Jacobite rising of 1745; War of the Austrian Succession; Seven Years' War; American Revolutionary War

General John Campbell of Strachur (1727 – 28 August 1806) was a British Army officer. Campbell commanded the British forces at the Siege of Pensacola, and succeeded Guy Carleton, 1st Baron Dorchester as Commander-in-Chief in North America in 1783 following the end of the American War of Independence.

== Early military career ==
He inherited the title (17th of Strachur) upon the death of his father Admiral John Campbell (16th of Strachur) and was a direct descendant of the Strachur branch of Clan Campbell. John Campbell was appointed lieutenant in John Campbell, 4th Earl of Loudoun's Highlanders in June 1745.

The young Campbell showed his military prowess during the Jacobite rising of 1745 and served in the British Army throughout the rising of 1745–1746 including the Battle of Culloden, in which he was wounded. He made the campaign in Flanders in 1747 during the War of the Austrian Succession, in which year he became a captain. At the peace of 1748 he went on half pay.

== Seven Years' War ==
In 1756, he was called into active service and joined the 42nd (Royal Highland) Regiment of Foot (also known as the Black Watch Regiment) and served under James Wolfe.

He was wounded in the Battle of Carillon in the French and Indian War and, on his recovery, was appointed major of the King's 17th Regiment of Foot, later the Royal Leicestershire Regiment, and now the Royal Anglian Regiment. In February 1762, he became a lieutenant colonel and commanded the 17th Foot in the expedition against Martinique and Havana. He became lieutenant colonel and commanding officer of the West Middlesex 57th Regiment of Foot on 1 May 1773 and was stationed in Ireland with his regiment, which was mostly Irish. In December 1775, the regiment departed Cork with several other regiments to fight in the American Revolution.

== American War of Independence ==
=== Commanding the 57th Regiment in America ===
The expedition from Cork, Ireland arrived off the coast of Cape Fear, North Carolina in April and May 1776 after a very rough voyage. It then moved to attack Charleston, South Carolina from the sea. The 57th landed along with other units at Long Island with orders to wade across to Sullivan's Island, while the British Navy bombarded Continental positions on Sullivan's Island. Campbell and other senior officers quickly realized that the water was chest to shoulder level, which meant that no one could wade to Sullivan's Island. Campbell then was ordered to re-board his regiment into boats and attempt an amphibious landing. When another regiment led this assault and began to get raked by fire from the American defenders, the British assault was called off. Campbell and his unit thus avoided direct action. All these units redeployed to Staten Island, New York on 21 July 1776.

Arriving on 1 August at Staten Island, Campbell and his regiment remained aboard ships until they were landed on Long Island on 26 August 1776. Campbell's regiment was assigned to the 6th Brigade under MGEN Agnew along with the 23rd, 44th, and 64th. This brigade was placed on the British left and made a distracting attack while the main British assault came from the opposite flank. Only one private was killed in the 57th.

After the battle, his unit participated in amphibious assaults in and around New York. On 23 September 1776, Campbell led his regiment against the fortifications at Paulus Hook, New Jersey; however, the American garrison of approximately 100 had evacuated only hours earlier. Campbell took the fort without any loss of life. This remained a British stronghold in New Jersey for most of the war.

On 6 October 1777, he led the 57th, which along with other British units, stormed Ft. Montgomery. His unit sustained several casualties, but he was not harmed. After destroying the fort, the British returned to New York.

In October 1778, the regiment was dispatched to raid Egg Harbor—modern day Port Republic, New Jersey. The British Navy had trouble disembarking the troops, who had to rush into the town. While Campbell ordered a successful surprise bayonet attack at night, the British had to evacuate without having accomplished all their goals.

Shortly after the 57th's return to New York City, Campbell was promoted to Brigadier General and transferred to a staff command.

=== Military command of West Florida ===
In October 1778 John Campbell, recently promoted to brigadier general, received an order from Lord George Germain to proceed to Pensacola in the Province of West Florida and take command of His Majesty's troops there.

The expanded West Florida territory in 1767.

Upon his arrival in Pensacola, Campbell described the conditions there as the most disagreeable, the most irksome, the most distressing of all situations anyone in the British Army had ever encountered. In January 1779 Campbell sent a report back to London stating that he found himself "without money or credit for Contingent Expenses, without Vessels proper for Navigation or even Batteaux ... without artificers wherewith to carry on Works ... without any Provisions or Materials to Work upon, without any Prospect of their being procured ... but by the labour of the Troops, without Tools for accommodating the few Artificers that could be found among the army, without Engineers Stores, without even adequate Provisions." Campbell immediately set out to improve the situation and began to construct a fort on the Mississippi by September 1779.

Campbell brought a detachment of Royal Artillery, the 3rd Regiment of Waldeck and two Provincial North American Loyalist Corps (the Pennsylvania and the Maryland Loyalists) from New York to reinforce the garrison at Pensacola. These augmented the 16th and the 60th Regiments. Governor Peter Chester of West Florida had organized a local troop of dragoons, called the West Florida Foresters. Auxiliary forces (of Native Americans) had been raised by Colonel John Stuart, Superintendent of Indian Affairs in the Southern District. Campbell also requested of General Sir Henry Clinton a company of Negroes which was under Clinton's command, and later urged his commander-in-chief to send English troops to West Florida. With the increasing number of troops came added difficulties: the problems of adequate quarters and sufficient provisions. Meeting these demands gave Campbell much concern. Payment of the troops was in arrears since October 1778, and only paper notes had been issued as money. However, these logistical difficulties were overcome well before the Spanish attack upon Pensacola.

On 19 February 1779, Campbell was promoted Major General, and on 22 March 1779, he was given complete authority over all troops in the Province of West Florida.

No adequate defence of the province could be realized until the neglected harbours of Pensacola and Mobile were strengthened. Pensacola only had intermittent naval protection, and Campbell was unimpressed with the existing fort that guarded the harbor entrance. The harbour of Mobile was unprotected by an old French/Spanish brick fort. Campbell correctly concluded that Pensacola's downtown fort was too dilapidated and too close to the water to provide suitable defense.

The acuteness of conditions in West Florida prodded Lord Germain to action: supplies and provisions had left England in January 1779 in a convoy for Pensacola via Jamaica. Alexander Cameron had been appointed Superintendent of Indian affairs in the Southwest and was to be under the commander-in-chief, General Clinton. Cameron was to follow Campbell's orders. In April 1779 Campbell reported to Germain the progress of the numerous activities under his supervision.

==== Declaration of war ====
On 21 June 1779, Spain declared war on Britain. On 25 June 1779, Campbell was ordered by secret letter to organize an attack on New Orleans, if he thought it possible. His preparations included: (1) secure from Vice-Admiral Sir Peter Parker as many armed vessels as could be spared from Jamaica, (2) collect all forces which could be drawn together in the province, (3) take as many faithful Indians as the Superintendent could supply, (4) draw on the Lords Commissioners of the Treasury for all expenses. Unfortunately for Campbell, Bernardo de Gálvez, the governor of Spanish Louisiana, also received an intercepted copy of the letter. On 11 September 1779, Gálvez led a Spanish force and their Indian allies marched against British forts on the lower Mississippi, capturing Fort Bute and Fort New Richmond at Baton Rouge. Because they successfully interfered with British communications, Gálvez secured the surrender of most of western West Florida before Campbell was aware of it.

On 14 September 1779 Campbell was ready to embark with five vessels and two flatboats and with five hundred men, ample provisions, and a large supply of gifts for the Indians. He was proceeding to the attack of New Orleans when news arrived of Gálvez's attack on the Mississippi. Governor Peter Chester was indifferent in his conduct to Campbell for the defence of the Province of West Florida and would not proceed beyond the strict and most limited Construction of the Law to save West Florida. With the loss of the Mississippi area, General Campbell and Lord Germain, quite naturally, centred their attention on the defence of the eastern part of the province. The proper management of the Indians was of greater significance than ever. Efforts were made by General John Campbell to negotiate with the Chickasaws with the Cherokees and Creeks to act jointly on behalf of the English.

The very day in which Campbell informed Clinton of the latest developments in West Florida, the Spanish were approaching Fort Charlotte and Mobile. On 14 March 1780, Fort Charlotte and Mobile capitulated to Spanish forces. In immediate command of the English forces at Fort Charlotte was Captain Elias Durnford. Campbell had left Pensacola with reinforcements on 5 March 1780, but heavy rains, swollen streams and muddy roads retarded his progress. When his scouts reported the display of Spanish colors over the fort, Campbell turned back to Pensacola, returning on 18 March 1780. With the surrender of Mobile, West Florida was reduced to the District of Pensacola alone. Unless Pensacola was relieved by a naval reinforcement from Jamaica, Pensacola would be lost. Campbell complained to Germain that even a single frigate would have made a difference in the defense of Mobile.

While Governor Gálvez was preparing for his advance against Pensacola, the rivalry between Campbell and Governor Chester flared up again. The governor sought to restrict Campbell's authority over the troops. Campbell predicted a Spanish attack in early fall 1780 but it didn't come. Tired of waiting for the Spanish to assume the initiative, Campbell in January 1781, ordered the commander of the 3rd Waldeck Regiment, Lieutenant Colonel Johann von Hanxleden, with more than 500 men, to seize at the Spanish fortified outpost at "The Village" on the east side of Mobile Bay. The attack was unsuccessful because Hanxleden was killed early in the battle. Instructed to attack on Hanxleden's signal, the British's Choctaw allies failed to envelope the Spanish forces during the battle's climax due to their commander's premature death. With one of his favorite commanders dead, his forces in retreat, and his Choctaw allies failing to deliver their promised effectiveness, Campbell found himself utterly and continuously frustrated with the military situation on the Gulf Coast in 1781.

=== Siege of Pensacola ===
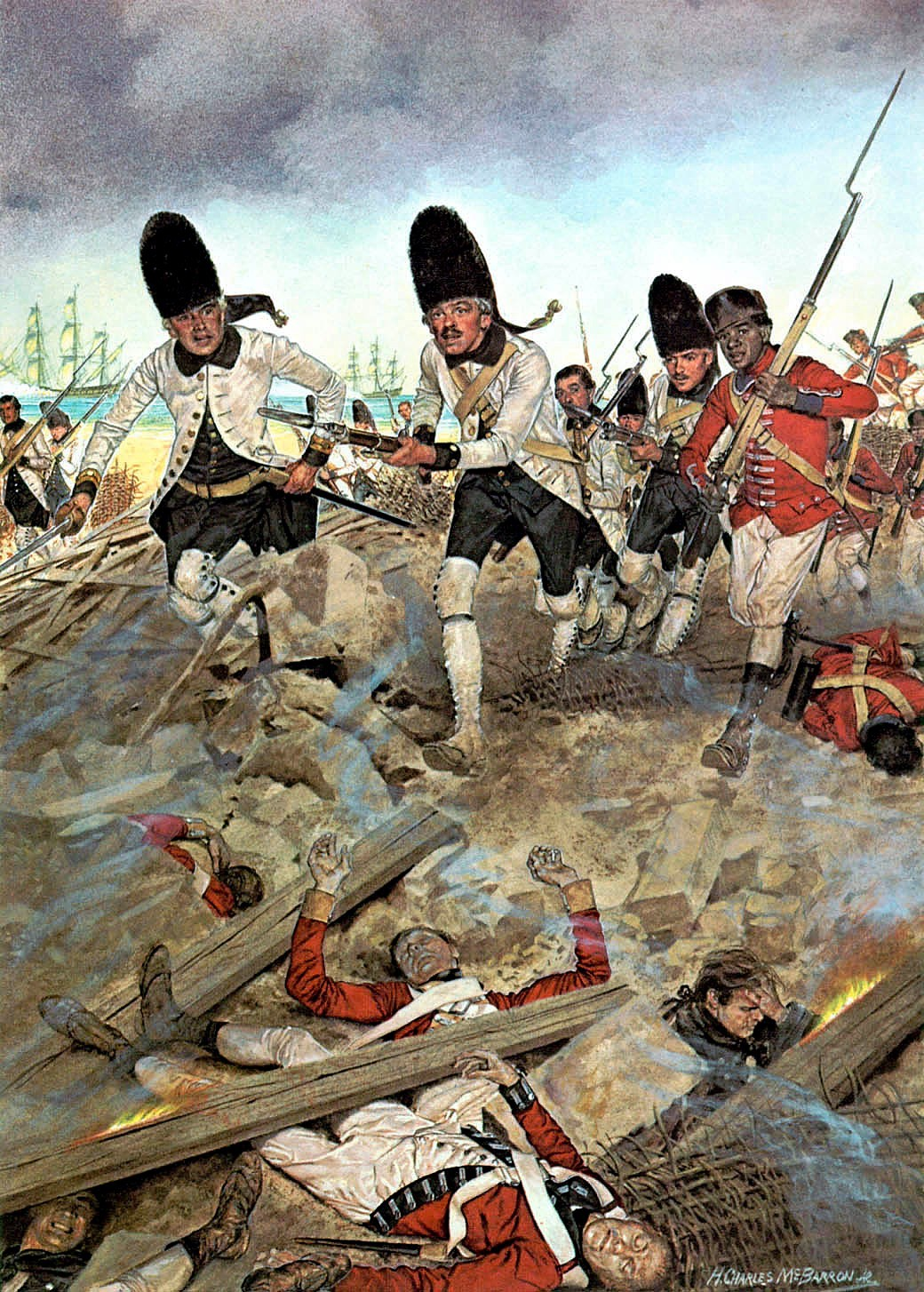
Spanish grenadiers and Havana militia pour into Fort George

Early in March 1781 the long-awaited Spanish attack on Pensacola began. On the afternoon of 11 March Gálvez's ships were at the entrance of Pensacola Bay, having already taken control of Santa Rosa Island. On 21 March 1781, Campbell made a humane proposal to Gálvez that the town and garrison of Pensacola should be spared. Unfortunately, in the night, before the Spanish commander replied, one of the British officers in charge of a fort burned several houses. Whether or not this act was committed with Campbell's knowledge is not known but it gave Gálvez grounds for accusing him of insincerity.

Detachments from Mobile and New Orleans arrived 28 March 1781, and on 19 April reinforcements, naval and army, Spanish and French, from Cuba led by General Jose Solano y Bote arrived. Campbell inspired his troops to defend Fort George. However, without naval protection nor adequate artillery to engage a counter assault, the Spanish artillery fire breached the ramparts on 8 May 1781, and struck a powder magazine. A powerful flotilla of warships neutralized outer British defenses and began an amphibious siege of the town on 9 May 1781. John Campbell surrendered Fort George to the Spaniards on 10 May 1781. Under generous terms Governor Gálvez allowed the British troops, including Campbell, to return to New York.

Campbell was initially taken to Havana where he was paraded around the city, an act for which the Governor Juan de Cagigal was later imprisoned by the Spanish authorities. Campbell was then repatriated to British territory. He remained in British-held New York City until the British left under the Treaty of Paris on Evacuation Day, 25 November 1783. Campbell lived just off Wall Street on the corner of Trinity Place and Thames Street.

== Later life ==
In 1783, Campbell replaced Sir Guy Carleton as Commander-in-Chief, North America, a post he held until 1787. He returned to Scotland in 1787, where, as Clan Chief of the Campbells of Strachur he established Strachur House.

Later in life Campbell lamented his posting to West Florida with much feeling: "It has been my misfortune . . . to be employed in an ill fated Corner of His Majesty's Dominions . . . My endeavours have unremittingly been exerted for West Florida's preservation to the British Empire since I took upon me the military command, and if my Labours and Exertions to that end shall but find favour with my sovereign. I shall forget the Frowns of Fortune and be happy in the Royal Approbation."

Campbell died at Strachur House, Argyll, Scotland, on 28 August 1806.

Military offices
Preceded by Sir Guy Carleton	Commander-in-Chief, North America; 1783–1787	Succeeded by The Duke of Kent and Strathearn
Preceded by Sir John Irwin	Colonel of the 57th (West Middlesex) Regiment of Foot; 1780–1806	Succeeded by The Lord Hutchinson
