= Battle at The Village =

1781 battle of the American Revolutionary War

- Part of the Gulf Coast campaign
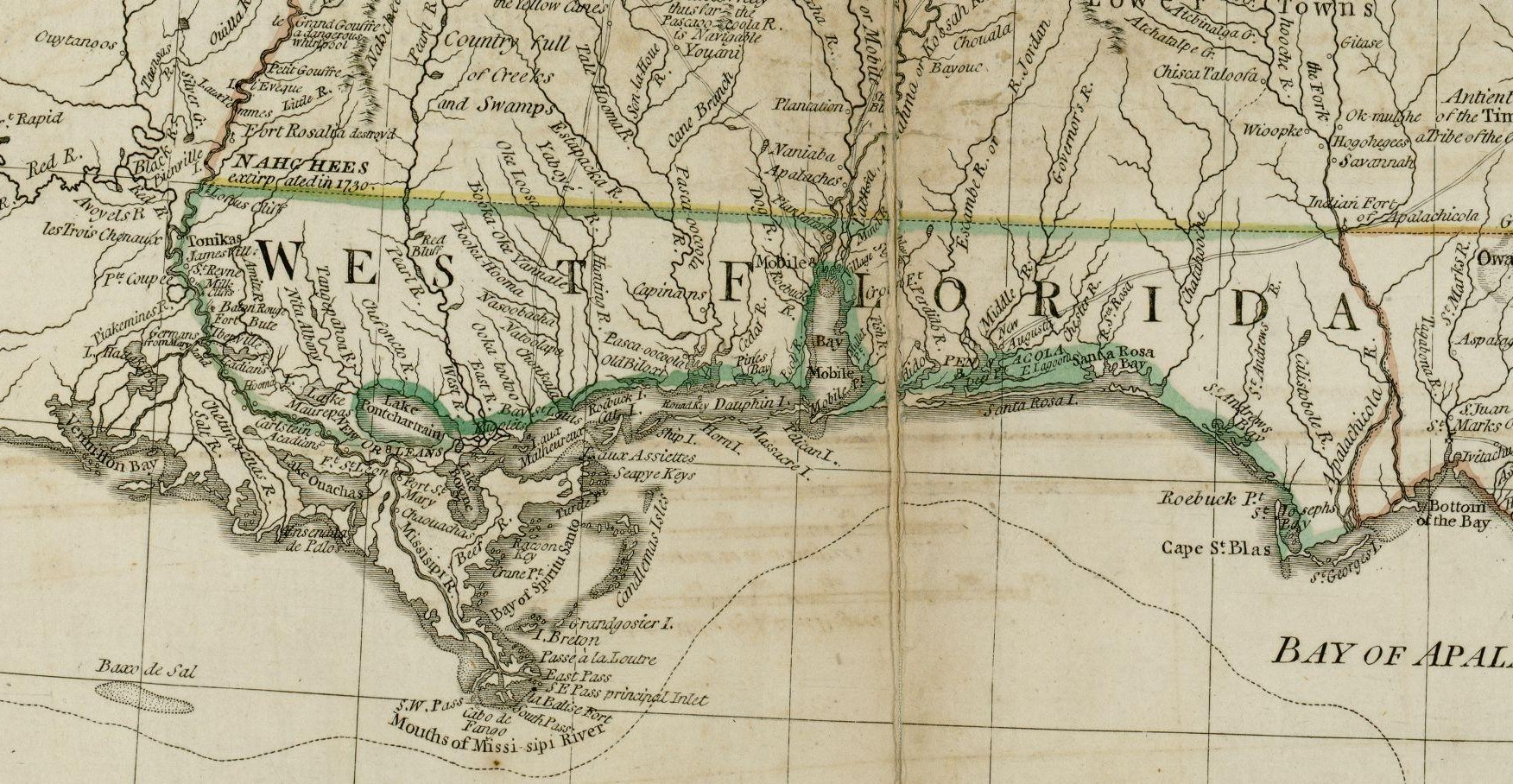
- Detail from a 1776 map showing West Florida
Date	January 5–7, 1781
Location	The Village, West Florida (present-day Daphne, Alabama) 30°37′33.79″N 87°54′55.03″W
Result	Spanish victory

Belligerents
Spain	Great Britain: Waldeck; Choctaw

Commanders and leaders
(Spanish Empire) Ramón de Castro y Gutiérrez; (Spanish Empire) José de Ezpeleta y Galdeano	(Kingdom of Great Britain) John Campbell; Johann Ludwig Wilhelm von Hanxleden †; (Kingdom of Great Britain) Philip Key; (Kingdom of Great Britain) Robert Deans

Strength
190 troops	180 regular troops and provincial militia; 420 Choctaw; 2 frigates; 1 bilander

Casualties and losses
Losses: 49; 14 killed; 35 wounded or missing	Losses: 41; 18 killed; 23 wounded
- Location within modern-day North America

The Battle at The Village (also known as the Second Battle of Mobile) was fought on January 7, 1781. It was a failed British attempt to recapture a Spanish fortification at "The Village," during the American Revolutionary War. The attack was led by Waldecker Colonel Johann von Hanxleden who was killed in the attempt.

== Background ==
After Spain declared war on Great Britain in 1779, Bernardo de Gálvez, the governor of Louisiana, immediately began offensive operations to gain control of neighboring West Florida, which included parts of today's Louisiana, Mississippi, and Alabama. In September 1779 he gained complete control over the lower Mississippi River by capturing Fort Bute and shortly afterwards obtaining the surrender of the remaining enemy forces in the region following the Battle of Baton Rouge. He followed up these successes with the capture of Mobile on March 14, 1780, following a brief siege. (In the spring of 1781, Gálvez would go on to capture Pensacola, West Florida's administrative capital.)

After the victory in Mobile, the Spanish built an entrenched outpost on the east side of Mobile Bay. This outpost was designed to defend "The Village," a settlement that occupied the eastern ferry terminus on Mobile Bay for the main road between Mobile and Pensacola. When the British troops arrived on January 7, the outpost was manned by about 200 men of the Principe Regiment, under Ramón de Castro y Gutiérrez.

== Prelude ==
The British garrison nearest to Mobile was in West Florida's capital, Pensacola. The commander, General John Campbell, had under his command about 500 men, composed mostly of men from the 16th and 60th Regiments, but also including some Waldecker grenadiers and some provincial militia. The British relations with the Creeks, Chickasaw, and Choctaw Indians were also relatively good. Hundreds of Choctaw warriors responded to British pleas for help and came to Mobile.

Emboldened by the destruction of a Gálvez-led expedition against Pensacola by a hurricane in the fall of 1780, Campbell decided to attempt the recapture of Mobile. On January 3, he dispatched an expedition of more than 700 men under Waldecker Colonel Johann von Hanxleden.

== Battle ==
Hanxleden's force arrived near the outpost late on January 6, and made a dawn attack the next morning. Forty of the Spaniards made a dash for a boat anchored nearby, but the British cut many of them down with a musket volley. Indians from the expedition then followed the Spaniards into the water to collect scalps.

Johann von Hanxleden and Philip Barton Key lead a series of attacks against the entrenched Spanish position. The fourth and final attack met with partial success, with Key's men securing a foothold in the trench. However, Hanxleden was killed when the Spanish fixed bayonets and took up defensive positions. The momentum of Hanxleden's assault was lost and Key's regiment now lacked the second column necessary to hold their position and disengaged; resulting in an organised retreat in response to a Spanish counter-attack.

== Aftermath ==
The British retreated to Pensacola, and made no further attempts against Mobile. The death of Colonel Hanxleden, a favorite commander of General Campbell on the Gulf Coast, was a major loss to the British.

Spanish authorities in Cuba dispatched reinforcements to Mobile when they learned of the attack. Gálvez captured Pensacola later in the year, completing his conquest of West Florida.

Future governor of Puerto Rico Ramón de Castro y Gutiérrez used his experience in this battle to plan the defense of San Juan when the British attacked in 1797.

== Legacy ==
The battlefield and the settlement of "The Village" have, in many ways, been lost to history. Though located near Village Point in Daphne, Alabama, the surrounding area has seen a heavy amount of residential development that has long since leveled the battlefield or any historical structures related to the settlement.

== See also ==
- List of American Revolutionary War battles

== Bibliography ==
- Caughey, John Walton (1972). Bernardo de Gálvez in Louisiana, 1776-1783. Gretna, LA: Pelican. ISBN 978-0-911116-78-6. OCLC 539028.
- Marley, David (1998). Wars of the Americas: a chronology of armed conflict in the New World, 1492 to the present. Santa Barbara, CA: ABC-CLIO. ISBN 978-0-87436-837-6. OCLC 39024726.
- Hamilton, Peter Joseph (1897). Colonial Mobile: An Historical Study, Largely from Original Sources, of the Alabama-Tombigbee Basin from the Discovery of Mobile Bay in 1519 Until the Demolition of Fort Charlotte in 1821. New York: Houghton Mifflin. OCLC 9296191.
- Nester, William R (2004). The frontier war for American independence. Mechanicsburg, PA: Stackpole Books. ISBN 978-0-8117-0077-1. OCLC 52963301.
- Holmes, Jack D.L. (July 1976). "Alabama's Bloodiest Day of the American Revolution Counterattack at the Village, January 7, 1781" (PDF). Alabama Review. 29 (3): 207–219.
