= Charles Magill (Virginia judge) =

American judge and politician (1759–1827)

Judge of the United States Circuit Court for the Fourth Circuit
- In office March 3, 1801 – July 1, 1802
- Appointed by: John Adams
- Preceded by: Philip Barton Key
- Succeeded by: Seat abolished

Personal details
- Born: Charles Magill; July 10, 1759 County Kerry, Ireland
- Died: April 18, 1827 (aged 67) Winchester, Virginia
- Education: read law

Charles Magill (July 10, 1759 – April 18, 1827) was a United States circuit judge of the United States Circuit Court for the Fourth Circuit.

== Education and career ==
Born on April 15, 1759, in County Kerry, Ireland, Magill read law. He served in the Continental Army as a colonel during the American Revolutionary War. He entered private practice in Winchester, Virginia from 1785 to 1789, and until 1799. He was a deputy state's attorney in Frederick County, Virginia starting in 1789. He was a member of the Senate of Virginia from 1799 to 1800.

== Federal judicial service ==
Magill was nominated by President John Adams on February 25, 1801, to a seat on the United States Circuit Court for the Fourth Circuit vacated by Judge Philip Barton Key. He was confirmed by the United States Senate on February 26, 1801, and received his commission on March 3, 1801. His service terminated on July 1, 1802, due to abolition of the court.

== Later career ==
Following his departure from the federal bench, Magill resumed private practice in Winchester from 1802 to 1804. He was the Mayor of Winchester in 1805. He was in private practice and a planter in Winchester from 1806 to 1827.

== Death ==
Magill died on April 18, 1827, in Winchester.

== See also ==
- List of mayors of Winchester, Virginia

== Sources ==
Legal offices
Preceded by Philip Barton Key	Judge of the United States Circuit Court for the Fourth Circuit; 1801–1802	Succeeded by Seat abolished
