= Philip Barton Key =

United States federal judge (1757–1815)

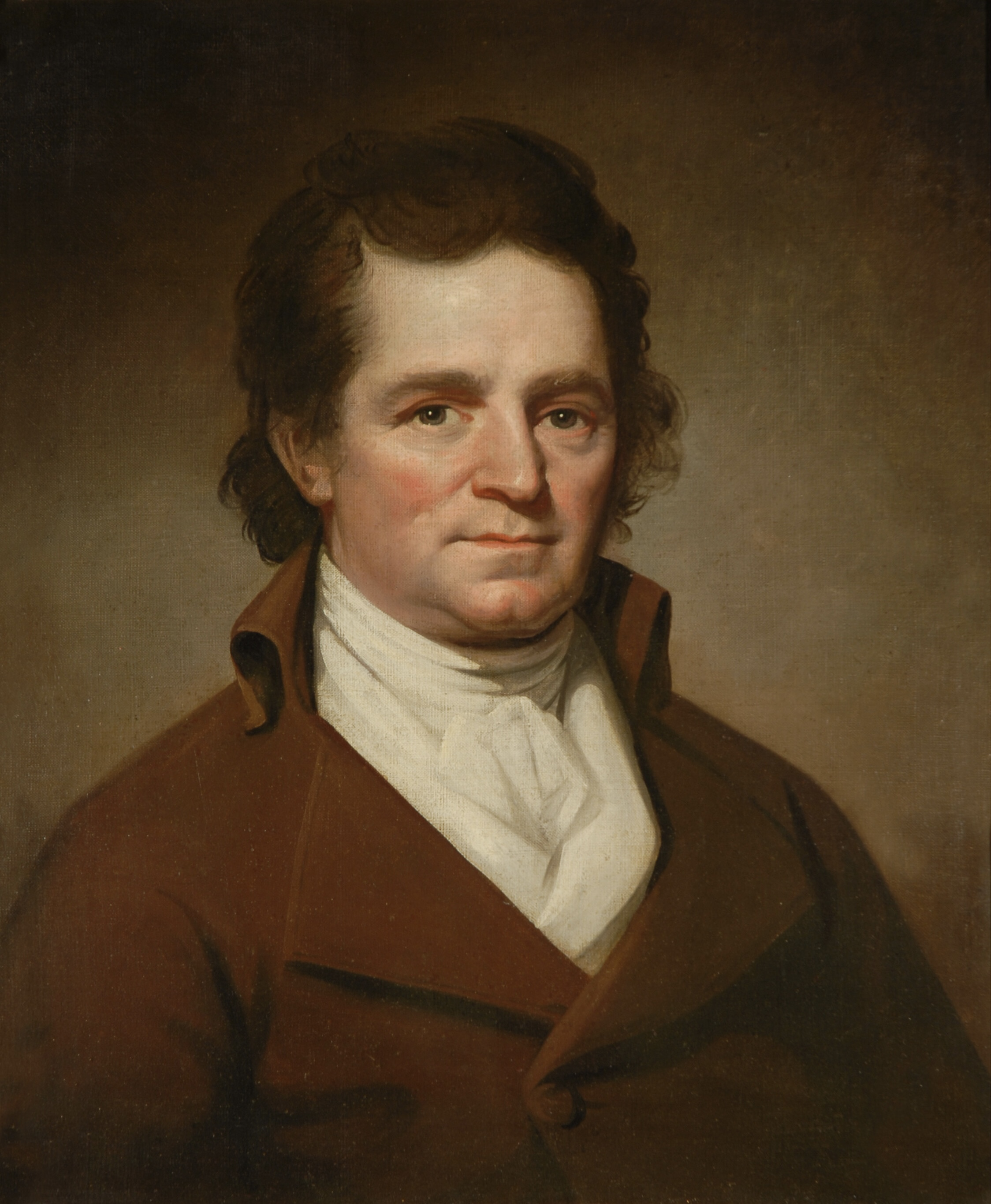
- Posthumous portrait, c. 1900–1905

Member of the U.S. House of Representatives from Maryland's 3rd district
- In office March 4, 1807 – March 3, 1813
- Preceded by: Patrick Magruder
- Succeeded by: Alexander Contee Hanson

Chief Judge of the United States circuit court for the Fourth Circuit
- In office March 3, 1801 – July 1, 1802
- Appointed by: John Adams
- Preceded by: Seat established by 2 Stat. 89
- Succeeded by: Seat abolished

Judge of the United States circuit court for the Fourth Circuit
- In office February 20, 1801 – March 3, 1801
- Appointed by: John Adams
- Preceded by: Seat established by 2 Stat. 89
- Succeeded by: Charles Magill

Personal details
- Born: Philip Barton Key; April 12, 1757 Charlestown, Province of Maryland, British America
- Died: July 28, 1815 (aged 58) Georgetown, D.C.
- Resting place: Oak Hill Cemetery; Washington, D.C.
- Party: Federalist
- Spouse: Anne Plater
- Relatives: John Eager Howard; William Howard (son-in-law); George Plater (father-in-law); Philip Key (cousin); Francis Scott Key (nephew); Philip Barton Key II (grand nephew)
- Education: Middle Temple read law

Military service
- Allegiance: Great Britain
- Branch/service: British Army
- Years of service: 1777–1781
- Unit: Maryland Loyalists Battalion
- Battles/wars: American Revolutionary War: Battle of Mobile (POW)

Philip Barton Key (April 12, 1757 – July 28, 1815), was an American Loyalist during the American Revolutionary War and later was a United States circuit judge and chief judge of the United States circuit court for the Fourth Circuit and a United States representative from Maryland.

== Education and career ==
Coat of Arms of Philip Barton Key

Born on April 12, 1757, near Charlestown, Cecil County, Province of Maryland, British America, Key pursued an academic course. He was a Loyalist during the American Revolutionary War, fighting with the British Army from 1777 to 1781. He served in the Maryland Loyalists Battalion as a captain. Key and his entire battalion were captured by the Spanish Army– who were at war with the British– in Pensacola, Florida. Key was a prisoner for a month in Havana, Cuba before being paroled and sent to New York City, New York until the end of the war. After the war, Key went to England and graduated from the Middle Temple in London in 1784 and read law in 1785. He returned to Maryland in 1785. He was admitted to the bar and entered private practice in Leonardtown, Maryland from 1787 to 1790. He continued private practice in Annapolis, Maryland from 1790 to 1794, and from 1799 to 1800. He was a member of the Maryland House of Delegates from 1794 to 1799. He was Mayor of Annapolis from 1797 to 1798.

== Federal judicial service ==
Key was nominated by President John Adams on February 18, 1801, to the United States circuit court for the Fourth Circuit, to a new seat authorized by 2 Stat. 89. He was confirmed by the United States Senate on February 20, 1801, and received his commission the same day. His service terminated on March 3, 1801, due to his elevation to serve as Chief Judge of the same court.

Key was nominated by President Adams on February 25, 1801, to the United States Circuit Court for the Fourth Circuit, to the new Chief Judge seat authorized by 2 Stat. 89. He was confirmed by the Senate on February 26, 1801, and received his commission on March 3, 1801. His service terminated on July 1, 1802, due to abolition of the court.

Following his departure from the federal bench, Key resumed private practice in Montgomery County, Maryland from 1802 to 1807, also engaging in agricultural pursuits. He served as counsel for Associate Justice of the Supreme Court of the United States Samuel Chase during his Senate impeachment trial in 1805.

== Congressional service ==
Key was elected as a Federalist from Maryland's 3rd congressional district to the United States House of Representatives of the 10th, 11th and 12th United States Congresses, serving from March 4, 1807, to March 3, 1813. He was Chairman of the United States House Committee on the District of Columbia for the 10th United States Congress.

== Later career and death ==
Following his departure from Congress, Key resumed private practice in Georgetown, D.C. (then a separate municipality in the District of Columbia, now a neighborhood in Washington, D.C.) from 1813 to 1815. He died on July 28, 1815, in Georgetown, D.C. He was initially interred on his estate “Woodley” in Georgetown, D.C. He was re-interred in Oak Hill Cemetery in Washington, D.C.

== Family ==
Key's cousin, Philip Key, was a United States representative from Maryland.

== See also ==
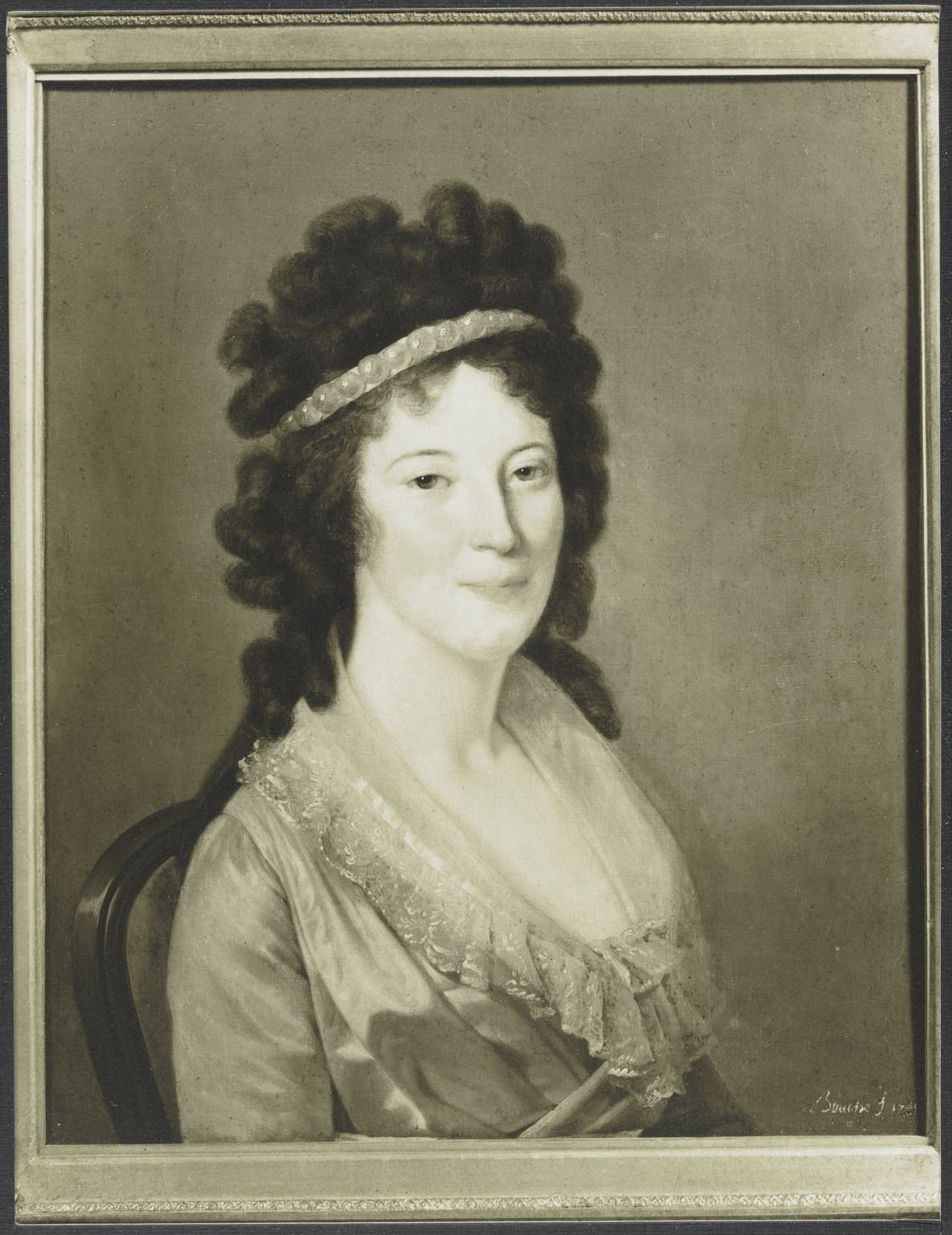
Mrs. Philip Barton Key (Anne Plater)

- Philip Key (U.S. politician), Key's cousin
- Francis Scott Key, Key's nephew
- Philip Barton Key II, Key's great-nephew
- John Eager Howard, father-in-law of Key's daughter
- William Howard (engineer), son-in-law
- George Plater, father-in-law

== Sources ==
- United States Congress. "Philip Barton Key (id: K000159)". Biographical Directory of the United States Congress.
- Philip Barton Key at the Biographical Directory of Federal Judges, a publication of the Federal Judicial Center.
- Purcell, L. Edward. Who Was Who in the American Revolution. New York: Facts on File, 1993. ISBN 0-8160-2107-4.
- Leepson, Marc. What So Proudly We Hailed: Francis Scott Key, A Life. New York: St. Martin's Press, 2014. ISBN 9781137278289.

Political offices
Preceded by John Bullen	Mayor of Annapolis; 1797–1798	Succeeded by Nicholas Carroll
Legal offices
Preceded by Seat established by 2 Stat. 89	Judge of the United States circuit court for the Fourth Circuit; 1801	Succeeded by Charles Magill
Preceded by Seat established by 2 Stat. 89	Chief Judge of the United States circuit court for the Fourth Circuit; 1801–1802	Succeeded by Seat abolished
U.S. House of Representatives
Preceded by Patrick Magruder	United States Representative from Maryland's 3rd congressional district 1807–1813	Succeeded by Alexander Contee Hanson
