= Philip Key (American politician) =

American politician

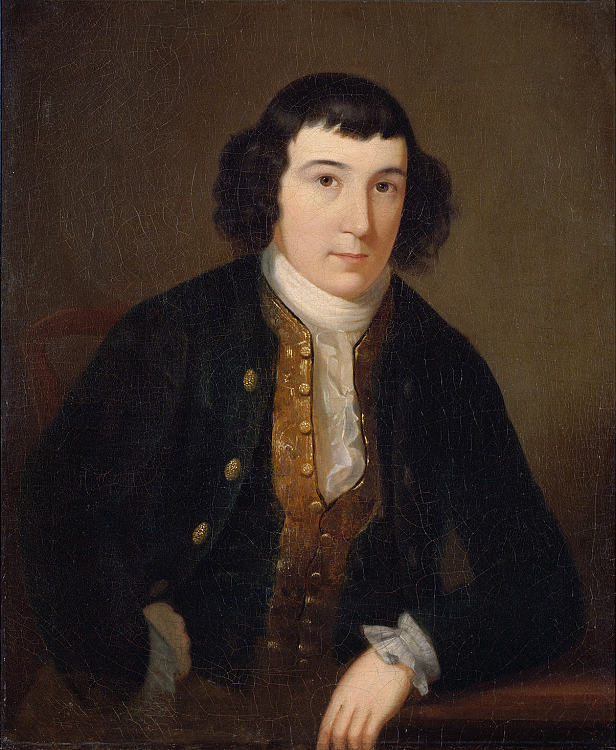
- Born: 1750; St. Mary's County
- Died: January 4, 1820 (aged 69–70); St. Mary's County
- Occupation: Politician; lawyer

Philip Key (1750 – January 4, 1820) was an American congressional representative from Maryland.

Key was the son of Dr. John Key and was probably born on his father's estate near Leonardtown, Maryland. His father died in 1755, leaving his grandfather and later his uncles to act as his guardians. He pursued an academic course in England. Key eventually returned to Maryland and engaged in farming, he then began to study law and was later admitted to the bar and practiced.

Key served in the Maryland House of Delegates in 1773, he then became a member of the committee of correspondence for St. Mary's County, in 1774. He again served as a member of the House of Delegates during 1779–1790. Key was then elected to the Second Congress, and represented the 1st Congressional district of Maryland from March 4, 1791 – March 3, 1793. Key then returned to the House of Delegates in 1795 and 1796 where he served as speaker.

Key died in Chaptico, Maryland, and is likely interred in the churchyard there.

Key is also the cousin of Philip Barton Key and great-grandfather of Barnes Compton.

U.S. House of Representatives
Preceded by Michael J. Stone	Member of the U.S. House of Representatives from Maryland's 1st congressional district 1791–1793	Succeeded by George Dent
Political offices
Preceded by Matthew Tilghman	Speaker of the Maryland House of Delegates; 1795–1796	Succeeded by James Carroll
