= Fort Peyton =

U.S. Army installation

- South of Moultrie Creek; Near St. Augustine, Florida in United States
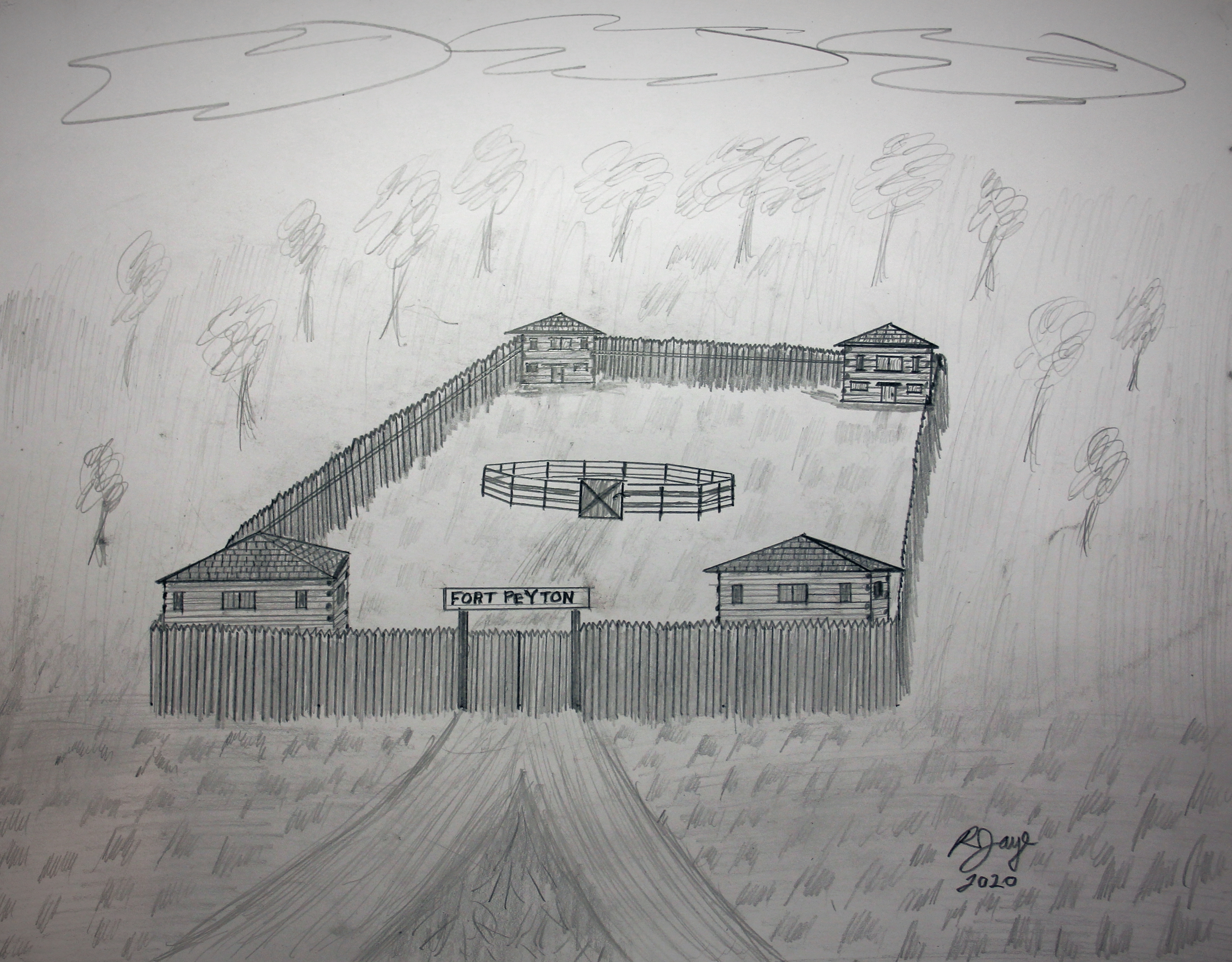
- Fort Peyton – Second Seminole War Fort (artist's depiction).

Location
- Location of Fort Peyton Fort Peyton (the United States)
- Coordinates: 29°49′29″N 81°21′36″W

Site history
- Built: August 1837
- Built by: United States Army
- In use: 1840
- Materials: Pine log stockade and buildings
- Fate: Abandoned in May 1840, burnt to the ground on February 14, 1842
- Events: Capture of Seminole leader Osceola occurred nearby on October 21, 1837

Garrison information
- Past commanders: Lt. Richard H. Peyton
- Garrison: Regular army troops

Fort Peyton was a stockaded fort built in August 1837 by the United States Army, one of a chain of military outposts created during the Second Seminole War for the protection of the St. Augustine area in Florida Territory. Established by Maj. Gen. Thomas Jesup, it was garrisoned by regular army troops.

The fort stood about five miles southwest of St. Augustine, on the south side of Moultrie Creek, near where the Treaty of Moultrie Creek had been signed in 1823 between the government of the United States and the chiefs of several bands of Seminoles living in the territory. On October 21, 1837, the Seminole leader Osceola was captured about a mile south of this site by Gen. Joseph Marion Hernández under a white flag of truce, on Gen. Thomas Jesup's orders.

== History ==
On October 20, 1837, Osceola had sent Juan Caballo (also known as John Horse), a trusted Black Seminole interpreter, to call on Brig. Gen. Joseph Hernández, the commander of the militia of St. Augustine, to request an interview. Jesup ordered Hernández to agree to the meeting and seize Osceola and Coe Hadjo when he arrived. On October 21, Osceola and Coe Hadjo, accompanied by 71 Seminole warriors, six women, and four Black Seminole warriors, awaited Hernández about eight miles south of St. Augustine.

Osceola requested that Gen. Jesup come out and talk with them. Jesup remained within the fort and did not reply, but directed Lt. Peyton to persuade Osceola and his men to come inside the fort and seize them. Osceola, however, refused to enter it, and Gen. Hernández was dispatched to parley with the Indians. Riding from St. Augustine, he picked up 250 dragoons under the command of Maj. James A. Ashby, and rode on to Fort Peyton.

In the meantime, Jesup sent Lt. Peyton to learn whether the Indians had given satisfactory answers to the questions Gen. Hernández asked them; the junior officer reported that their answers were evasive and unsatisfactory. Jesup then ordered Maj. Ashby to capture Osceola and his party, even though the conference was under a white flag of truce. Major Ashby obeyed his orders, and with the aid of Hernández, took the seventy-five armed Indian warriors, including Osceola, prisoner without a gun fired. This treacherous action was a flagrant violation of the laws of warfare, resulting in Jesup being denounced in the press and roundly condemned by public opinion.

== Overview ==
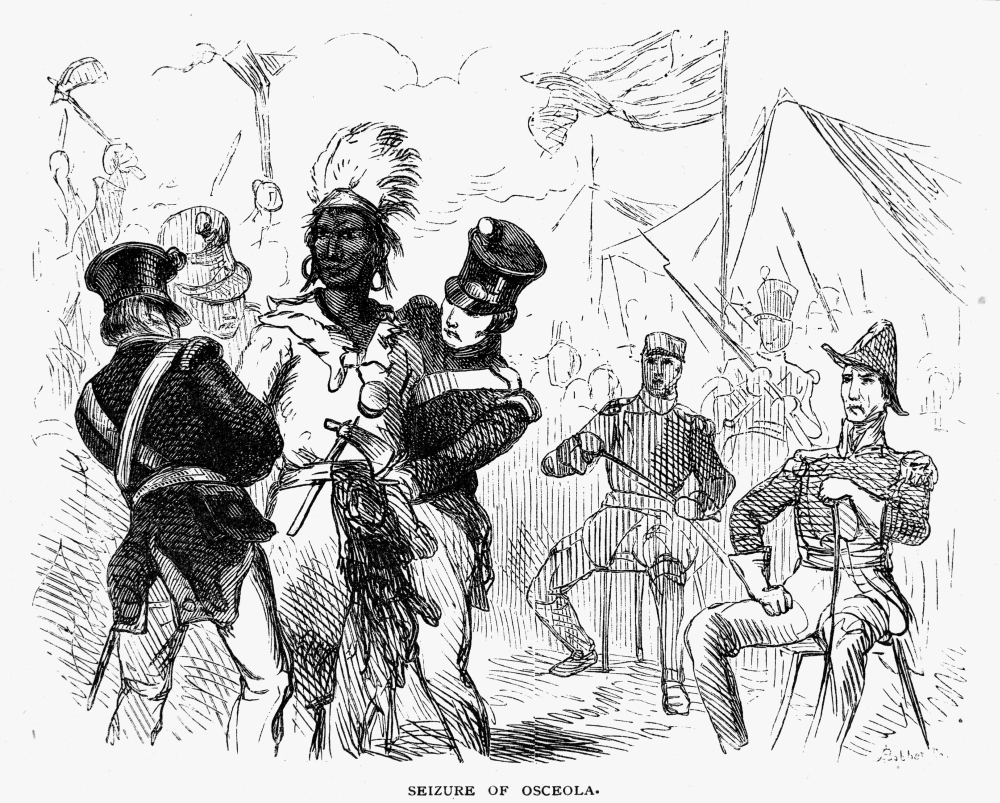
Capture of Osceola near Fort Peyton by US troops

This post was first known as Fort Moultrie, but its name was changed in honor of 1st Lieutenant Richard H. Peyton, 2nd U.S. Artillery, the post commander in 1837, who died in 1839 at Tampa.

The historian Charles H. Coe mentions in his 1898 book, Red Patriots: The Story of the Seminoles, that a St. Augustine native named John H. Masters, a sergeant in the squadron that captured the Seminole leader, many years later guided members of the St. Augustine Historical Society to the spot where the capture took place; a coquina marker with a plaque on it was placed there in 1916. A spokesman for the Historical Society, however, said in 2001 that the site is about a quarter mile away from a spot shown on an 1850s map.

=== Signage at the Site of Fort Peyton ===
The historical sign at the site of Fort Peyton reads, "Fort Peyton, established by Major General Thomas Sidney Jesup in August 1837 and garrisoned by regular army troops, was one of a chain of military outposts created during the Second Seminole War for the protection of the St. Augustine area. It consisted of four log houses built in a hallow square; two occupied by the troops and one by officers, and the fourth used as a hospital and commissary. This post was first known as Fort Moultrie, but its name was changed in honor of Lieutenant Richard H. Peyton, post commander in 1837. The Seminole Indian Chief, Osceola, was captured about a mile south of this site. Fort Peyton was ordered abandoned by the Secretary of War, Joel R. Poinsett, in May 1840. The buildings burned to the ground on February 14, 1842, presumably set afire by an incendiary."

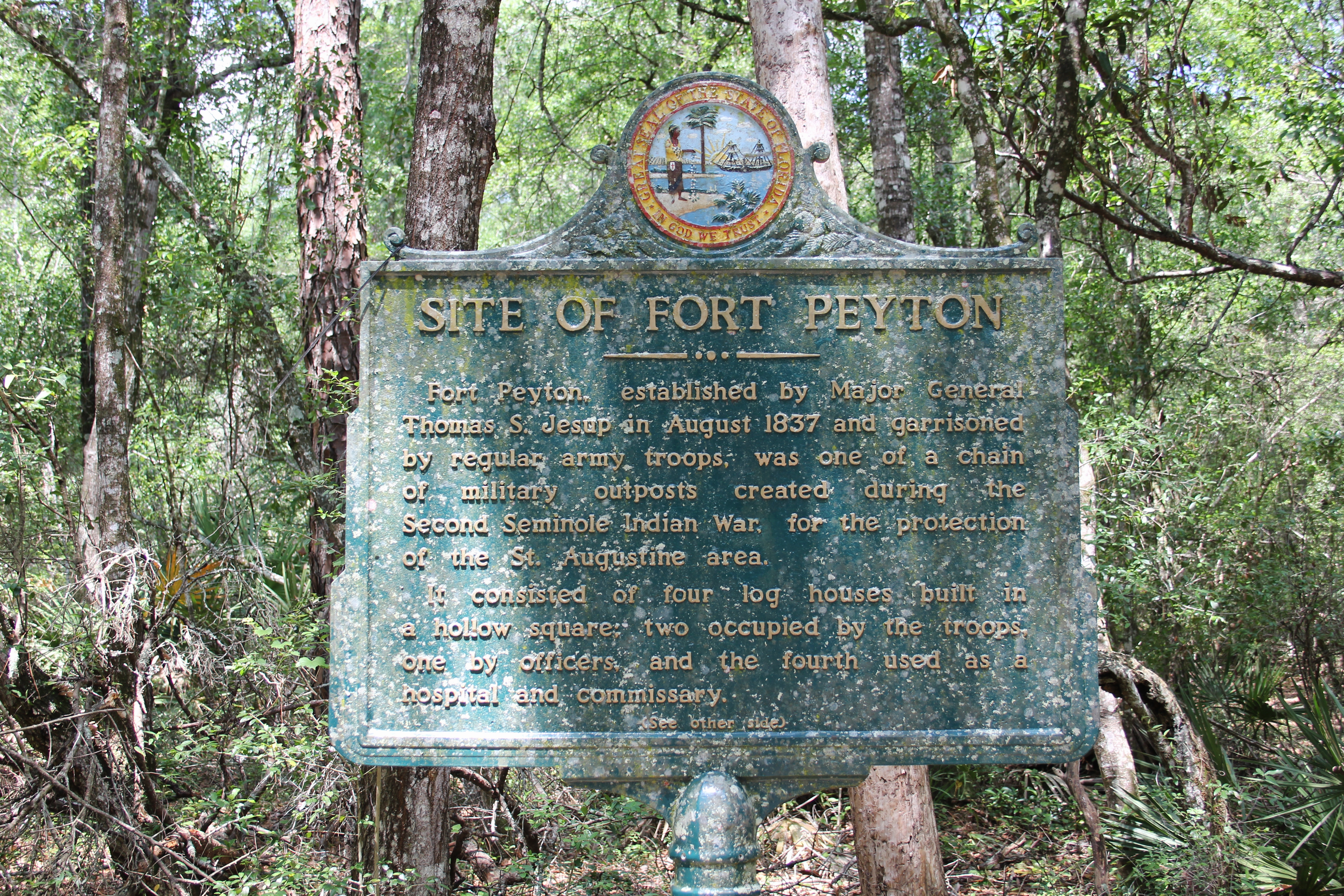
Front side of the historical sign at the site of Fort Peyton (photographed May 31, 2020).

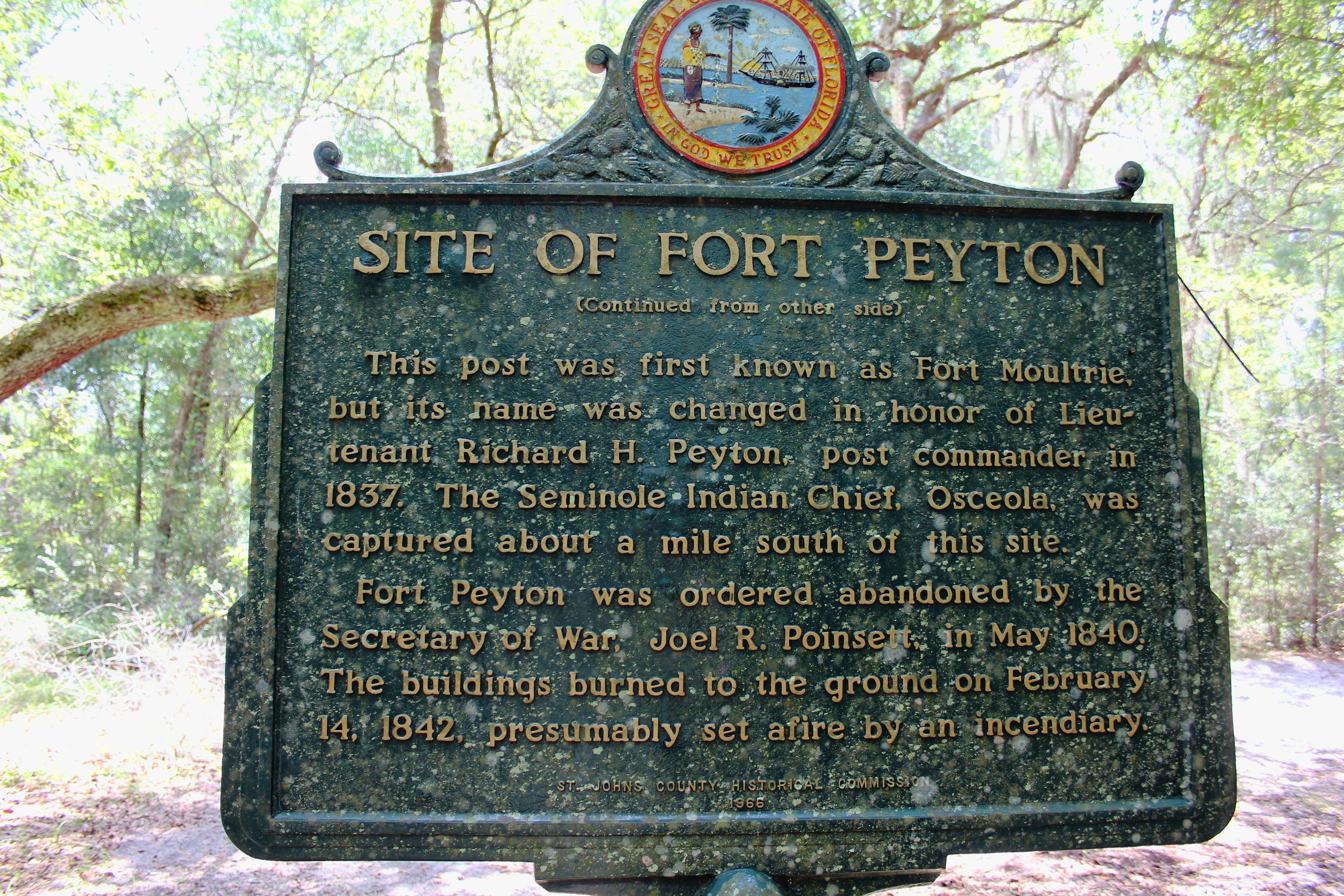
Back side of the historical sign at the site of Fort Peyton (photographed May 31, 2020).

== Network of outposts near St. Augustine during the Second Seminole War ==
There were many fortifications built near vital road and waterway routes in the St. Augustine area and to its south to protect the large plantations against Seminole Indian attacks. These fortifications were typically simple defensive structures and were used as supply depots, transportation and communication links, shipping points, field hospitals and housing for regular U.S. Army troops and militiamen. Many were abandoned by U.S. Army troops or militia forces during the Second Seminole War, and when the Seminoles found them abandoned and unguarded they looted any available supplies and burnt the forts and associated building structures.

In addition to Fort Peyton and Fort Hanson in the St. Augustine area many fortifications to the south of the city were constructed or commandeered by the U.S. Army and militia troops to defend the large plantation properties that were vital to both the war effort and the area's economy. These fortifications included: the Addison Blockhouse – also called Fort Duncan McRee, Camp Darley, Camp Dunlawton, Fort Barnwell (also called Fort Columbia), Fort Birch, Fort Caben, Fort Fulton, Fort Call, Fort Florida, Fort Kingsbury, Fort New Smyrna, Fort Volusia, St. Joseph's Fortress (also called Camp Brisbane), Post at Orange Grove Plantation and the Mala Compra Fortress also called Post at Mala Compra.

== Site of Fort Peyton ==
Today, the site of Fort Peyton is in an overgrown and heavily wooded area that is accessed via a dirt road. A concrete marker and historical sign are the only visual traces of this Second Seminole War fort.

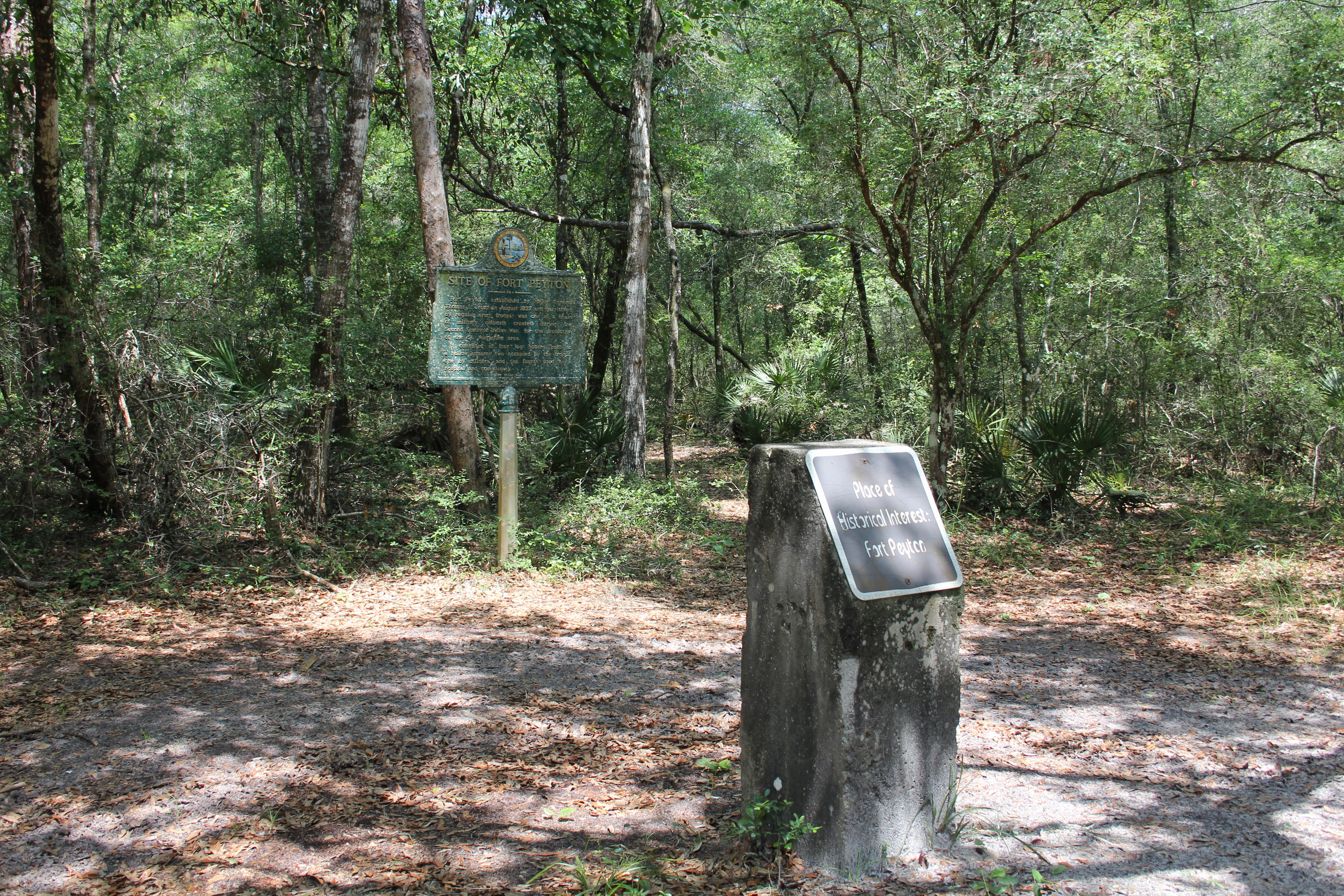
A Marker and Sign identify the site of Fort Peyton (photographed May 31, 2020).

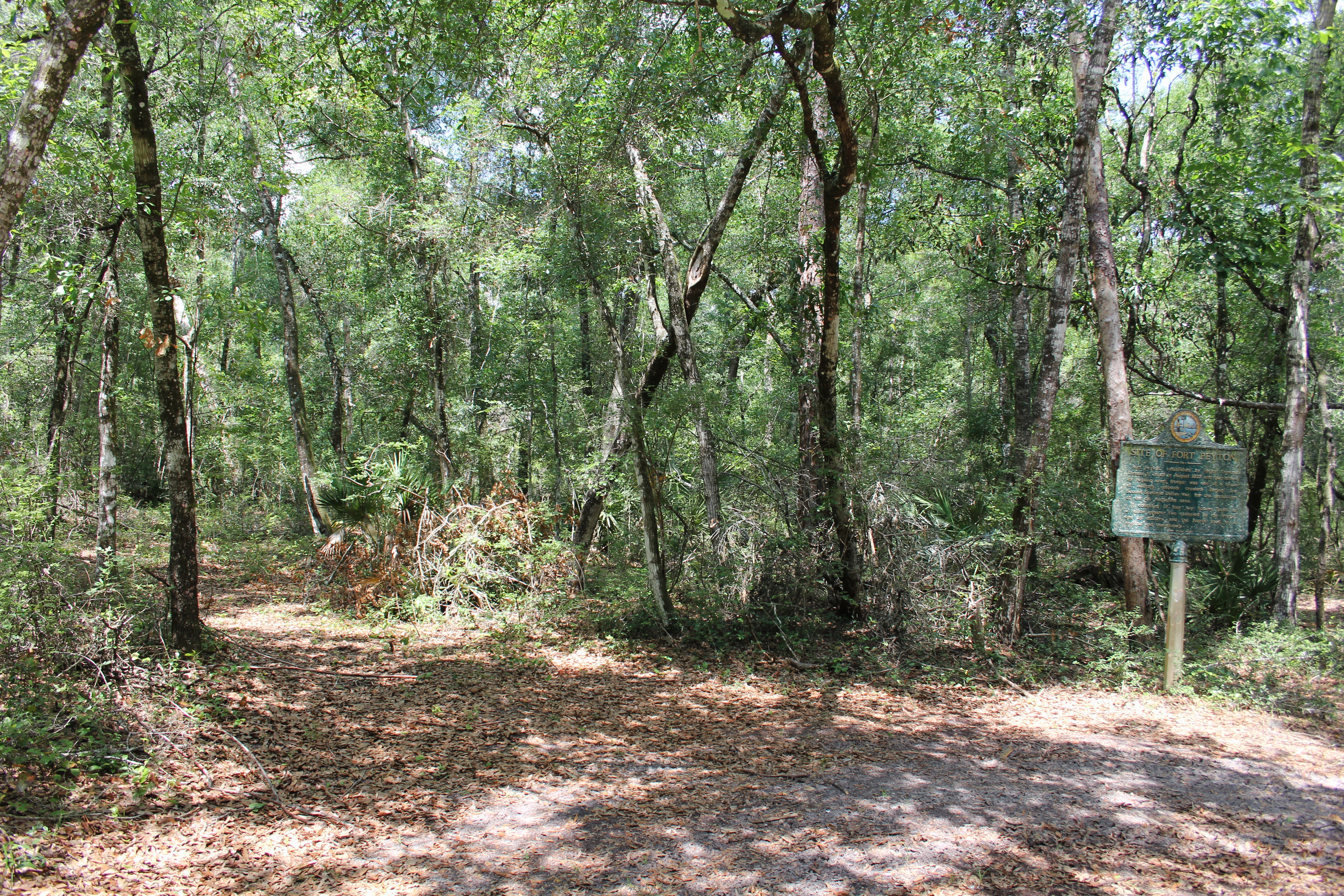
The site of Fort Peyton is now overgrown with thick vegetation and woods (photographed May 31, 2020).
