= Uchee Billy =

Yuchi chief (d. 1837)

Uchee Billy or Yuchi Billy (unknown–November 25, 1837, St. Augustine, Florida) was a chief of a Yuchi band in Florida during the first half of the 19th century. (Note: Another Yuchi chief known as Uchee Billy is reported to have lived in what is now Wilkinson County, in central Georgia. He is said to have sold his tribe's hunting grounds to whites, for which he was hanged by his people.) Uchee Billy's band was living near Lake Miccosukee when Andrew Jackson invaded Spanish Florida during the First Seminole War and attacked the villages in the area. Yuchi Billy and his band then moved to the St. Johns River. During the Second Seminole War, Uchee Billy was an ally of the Seminoles, and was one of the principal war chiefs who fought the U.S. Army.

== Early life ==
Uchee Billy was said to be the son of John Hicks (Tukose Emathla), a Mikasuki chief, and his wife. In 1818 he was identified as the chief of a Yuchi town of about 75 people associated with Mikasuki villages east of Tallahassee (around Lake Miccosukee). (Note: The Yuchi did not speak a Muskogean language (the Mikasuki language is Muskogean), but shared the culture of the Muscogee people (called "Creeks" by the English). They had belonged to the Muscogee Creek Confederacy before moving to Florida.)

After Andrew Jackson's troops raided the Mikasuki villages in 1818, the Yuchi led by Uchee Billy moved east to the St. Johns River area. The new village was established at Spring Garden (now De Leon Springs in Volusia County) by 1821.

It has been suggested that Euchee Billy's band moved to Spring Garden to be near the Mikasuki band led by Ee-mat-la (known as King Phillip). Uchee Billy's band was shortly afterward persuaded to leave Spring Garden by a white settler and moved to a place southwest of the St. Johns River. The U.S. government seems to have ignored the Yuchi presence, as no Yuchi chiefs were invited to the negotiations that resulted in the Treaty of Moultrie Creek in 1823.

== Second Seminole War ==
While the Yuchi were reported to have participated in the 1835 ambush of U.S. Army troops known as the Dade massacre, Uchee Billy is not known to have been there. He did travel into Georgia and Alabama at the beginning of the Second Seminole War and recruited more than 100 men to fight in Florida.

At the end of 1835, a war party of 80 to 120 men began attacking plantations east of the St. Johns River and south of St. Augustine. The war party, which included a few Yuchi and blacks, was identified as being under Uchee Billy's command. The war party burned buildings, including the lighthouse at Mosquito Inlet. and carried away slaves. A party under the leadership of Uchee Billy killed a member of a plantation family in January, causing the remaining white residents of the area to evacuate to St. Augustine.

General Winfield Scott assumed charge of the war in Florida in 1836, and initiated a plan to drive the Seminole out of their refuge in the Cove of the Withlacoochee into northern Florida, where the Army could more easily engage with them. One column, under Brigadier General Abraham Eustis, left St. Augustine and proceeded up the St. Johns River to Volusia, before crossing the river to head toward the Cove. Eustis's column engaged in a couple of skirmishes with Seminole warriors. After one skirmish it was reported that Ya-ha Hadjo, a Seminole chief, and Uchee Billy had been killed. It was found that the identification of Uchee Billy was mistaken.

Uchee Billy was captured by Brigadier General Joseph Hernandez, commander of the East Florida Militia, on the night of September 10, 1837. His brother Uchee Jack and most of his small band were also captured. Only one member of the band of 21 escaped. Hernandez was led to the site by a Seminole, Tomoka John, who had been captured along with Seminole Chief King Phillip two nights earlier at Dunlawton Plantation.

One U.S. soldier, 20-year-old Lieutenant John Winfield Scott McNeil, nephew of Franklin Pierce, was killed during the capture of Uchee Billy. A contemporary news account states only that Lieutenant McNeil was mortally wounded in the attack on the Yuchi camp. A 19th-century military history records that Uchee Billy shot Lt. McNeil as he led the charge into the Yuchi camp.

Uchee Billy and his band were imprisoned in Fort Marion in St. Augustine, where Coacoochee and Osceola were also being held.

== Death ==
He died in the fort on November 25, 1837, in prison in St. Augustine, Florida. After his death his skull was defleshed by the attending physician Frederick Weedon from St. Augustine who kept it as a macabre curio. Weedon was also the attending physician for Osceola, whom he decapitated after his death at Fort Moultrie in South Carolina, and kept his head in a jar of preservative.

== Sources ==
- Boyd, Mark F.; Harris, Joseph W. (1951). "The Seminole War: Its Background and Onset". The Florida Historical Quarterly. 30 (1): 3–115. JSTOR 30138833.
- Jackson, Jason Baird (2012). Yuchi Indian Histories Before the Removal Era. Lincoln: University of Nebraska Press. ISBN 978-0803240414.
- Mahon, John K. (1985) [1967]. History of the Second Seminole War (Paperback ed.). Gainesville, Florida: University Presses of Florida. ISBN 978-0-8130-1097-7.
- New Hampshire Adjutant-General's Office (1868). "The Florida War". Report for the Year Ending June 1, 1868. pp. 289–99.
- Wickman, Patricia Riles (2006). Osceola's Legacy. Tuscaloosa, Alabama: University of Alabama Press. ISBN 978-0-8173-5332-2.
