= Fort Fulton =

Former fort in Florida, USA

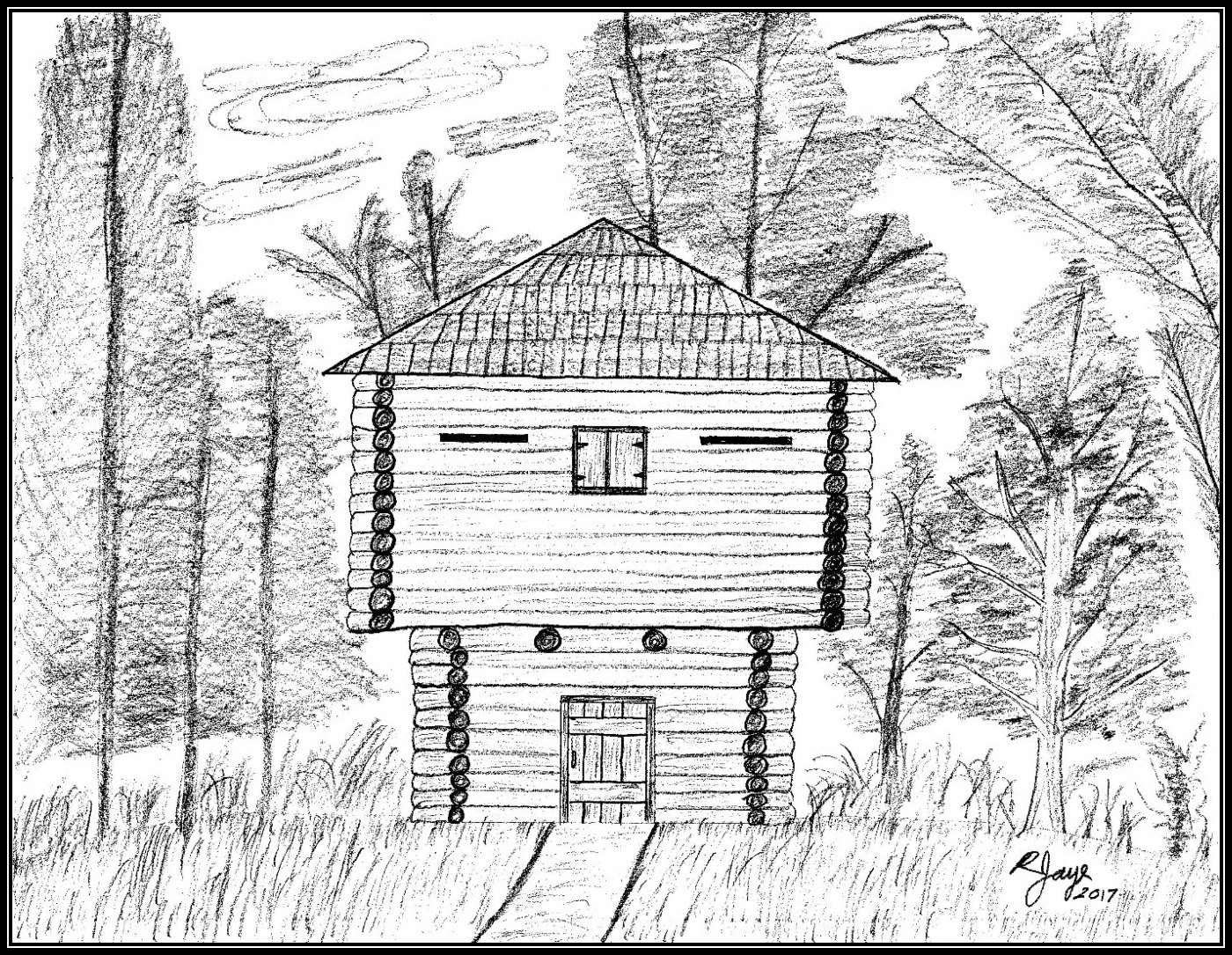
- Fort Fulton – a blockhouse style fortification used by militia volunteers and U.S. Army troops during the Second Seminole War - (artist's depiction).

- Location within Florida Location within the United States

General information
- Type: Second Seminole War Fort
- Architectural style: Log Blockhouse Fortification
- Location: Palm Coast, Florida, 7900 Old Kings Road N., Palm Coast, Florida
- Coordinates: 29°40′28.03″N 81°15′15.25″W
- Completed: 1840
- Demolished: 1842

Fort Fulton was established on February 21, 1840, between Old Kings Road and Pellicer Creek (west of present-day U.S. Highway 1) in present-day Flagler County, Florida. A January 17, 1840 article in the Florida Herald of St. Augustine stated, "Can anyone inform us why the Mounted Volunteer Company, raised in this city, and now stationed at Hewlett’s [Hewitt’s] Mill, is weakened by a detail of ten men subject to the order of the city council, and kept in town idle." This article suggests that Fort Fulton was most likely manned with militia volunteers since it was the only military post in the general area of Hewitt's Mill (which was located only about 1500 feet southwest from where Fort Fulton was built). Hewitt's Mill was a sawmill built in 1768 by John Hewitt on his 1,000-acre plot of land in St. Johns County. This sawmill is known to have supplied many wooden building materials to the St. Augustine area and surrounding plantations.

== Brief history ==
On May 13, 1840 Joel Roberts Poinsett (1779–1851), who served as the United States Secretary of War from March 7, 1837, to March 5, 1841, sent a correspondence to General Walker Keith Armistead (1773–1845), commander of the U.S. Army from 1840 to 1841 during the Second Seminole War that had plans to abandon two forts near St. Augustine in favor of three new forts which were to be established in their place. The two forts to be abandoned were Fort Hanson (located approximately thirteen miles southwest of St. Augustine) and Fort Peyton (originally called Fort Moultrie which was located 6 miles west of St. Augustine). It appears that the only fort that was used as a replacement was Fort Fulton (which was actually built prior to Poinsett's letter). Interestingly, there are no records of the two other forts ever being built in the areas documented in Poinsett's letter. Fort Hanson was abandoned in 1840 and later burned to the ground by the Seminoles and Fort Peyton was abandoned in May 1840 and burned to the ground on February 14, 1842.

== Operations ==
In addition to militia volunteers Fort Fulton was likely manned by U.S. Army troops on occasion as it was a military outpost that connected St. Augustine to the vast network of plantations to its south. In addition to being utilized for defensive purposes it was likely used for communications and reconnaissance purposes. From a military strategic view it makes sense that a blockhouse would have been located in this area during the Second Seminole War to protect the transportation routes along Old Kings Road and Pellicer Creek. No known attacks or skirmishes were recorded at Fort Fulton.

== Amateur Excavations ==
In the 1970s and 1980s, amateur excavations at the site of Fort Fulton were conducted by Belle Terre Middle School (Palm Coast, Florida) teacher, Buddy Taylor, and several students. Artifacts that were discovered included military buttons, musket shot, and a brass butt plate from a firearm. These artifacts that were collected were displayed at the school's museum for several years. It is not known where the artifacts are located today.

== Fate ==
Fort Fulton was most likely abandoned, and burned down, sometime around the end of the Second Seminole War in 1842. One map from 1846 includes Fort Fulton, but it is not likely that it was an active military post, or still standing, at that time. Today, the site where Fort Fulton once stood is overgrown with tangled weeds, vines and thick woods. The only visual sign that a blockhouse structure once existed in the area is a clearing of sugar sand among the thickets and trees.
