= Yuchi =

Native American ethnic group

Yuchi Tsoyaha
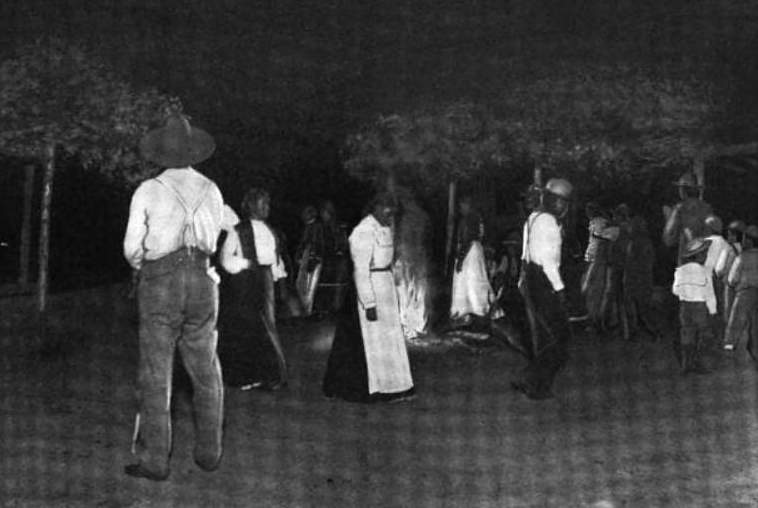
- Yuchi people dancing the Big Turtle dance, 1909

Total population
- 2010: 623

Regions with significant populations
- (United States) United States; Today: Oklahoma; Historically: Tennessee, later Alabama and Georgia

Languages
- English, Yuchi (L2 only)

Religion
- Christianity (Methodist), Stomp Dance, Native American Church

Related ethnic groups
- Muscogee

The Yuchi people (Note: Or Euchee, Uchee, Achee.) are a Native American tribe based in Oklahoma, though their original homeland was in the southeastern United States.

In the 16th century, the Yuchi lived in the eastern Tennessee River valley. By the late 17th century, they had migrated south to Alabama, Georgia, and South Carolina, settling near the Muscogee (Creek). Some also migrated to the Florida panhandle. After suffering heavy losses from epidemic diseases and warfare in the 18th century, the remaining Yuchi bands were forcibly relocated to Indian Territory in the 1830s, alongside their allies, the Muscogee.

Today, the Yuchi primarily reside in northeastern Oklahoma, where many are enrolled citizens of the federally recognized Muscogee Nation. They continue to maintain a distinct cultural identity, with some members still speaking the Yuchi language, a linguistic isolate.

== Name ==
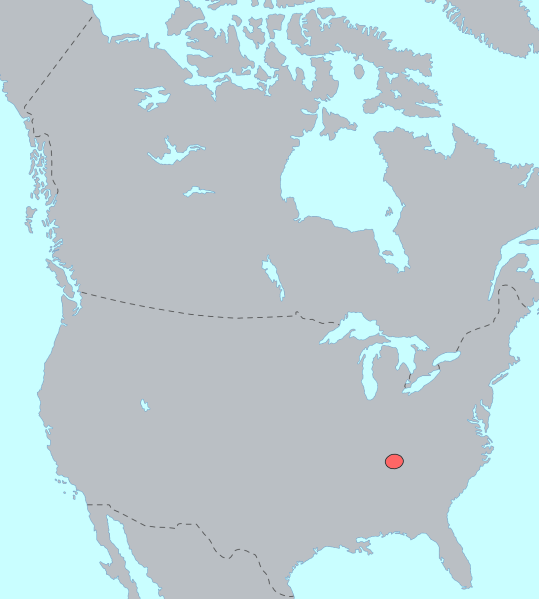
Original territory of the Yuchi tribe

The term Yuchi translated to "over there sit/live" or "situated yonder." Their autonym, or name for themselves, Tsoyaha or Coyaha, means "Children of the Sun." Their language is an isolate. The Shawnee called them Tahokale, and the Cherokee call them Aniyutsi.

== History ==
At the time of first European contact, the Yuchi people lived in what is now eastern Tennessee. In 1541, Spanish explorer Hernando de Soto described them as a powerful tribe known as the Uchi, that were also associated with the Chisca tribe.

Both historical and archaeological evidence exists documenting several Yuchi towns of the 18th century. Among these was Chestowee in present-day Bradley County, Tennessee. In 1714, instigated by two English fur traders from South Carolina, the Cherokee attacked and destroyed Chestowee. The Cherokee were prepared to carry their attacks further to Yuchi settlements south on the Savannah River, but the colonial government of South Carolina did not condone this. The Cherokee destruction of Chestowee marked their emergence as a major power in the Southeast.

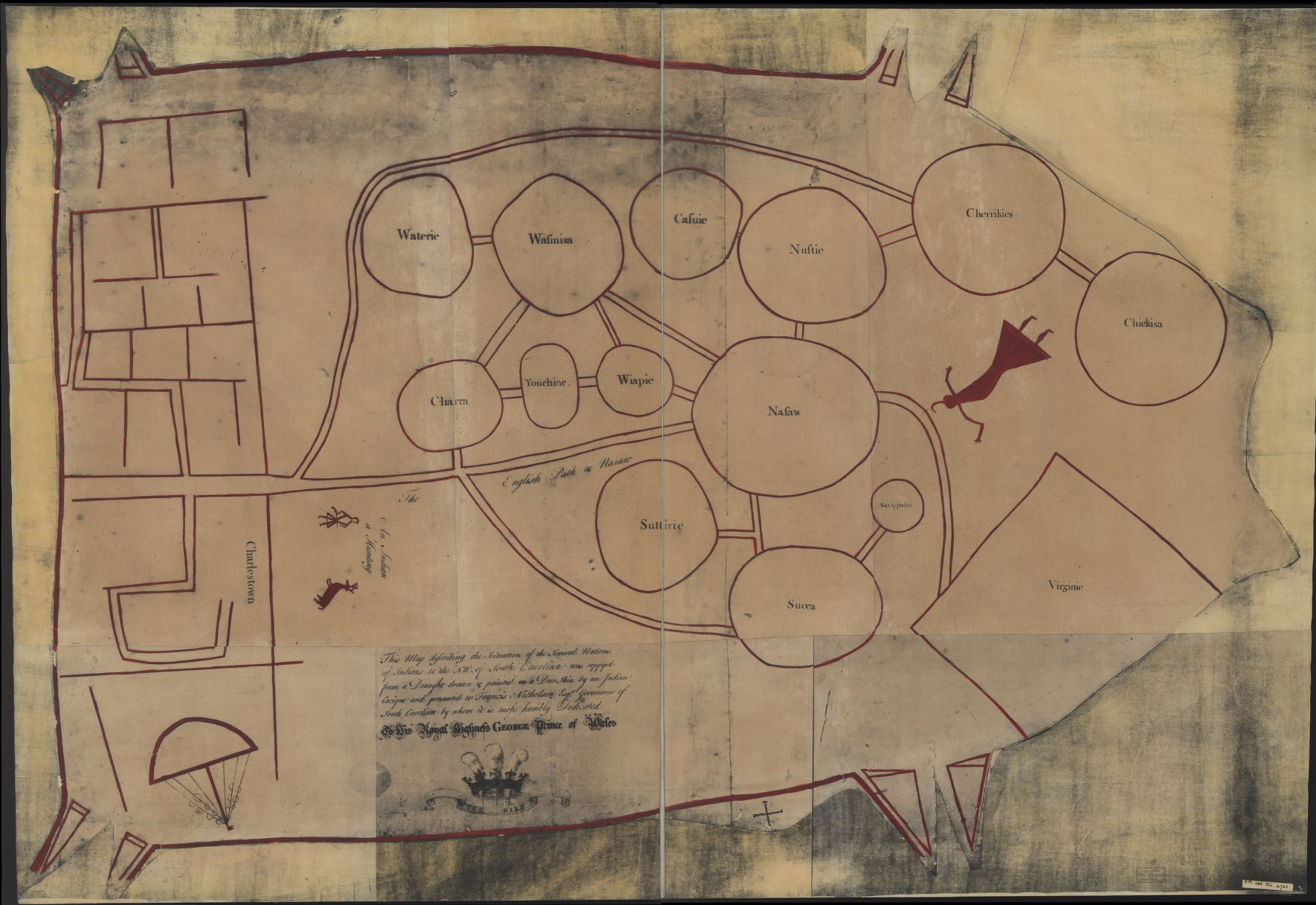
"Youchine" (Yuchi) on an c. 1724 annotated copy of a Catawba deerhide map of the tribes between Charleston (left) and Virginia (right) following the displacements of a century of disease, enslavement, and the 1715–17 Yamasee War

Yuchi towns were later documented in western South Carolina and northern Georgia, where the tribe had migrated to escape pressure from the Cherokee. "Mount Pleasant" was noted as being on the Savannah River in present-day Effingham County, Georgia, from about 1722 to about 1750. To take advantage of trade, the British established a trading post and small military garrison there, which they called Mount Pleasant.

"Euchee Town" (also called Uche Town), a large settlement on the Chattahoochee River, was documented from the middle to late 18th century. It was located near Euchee (or Uche) Creek, about ten miles downriver from the Muscogee settlement of Coweta Old Town. The naturalist William Bartram visited Euchee Town in 1778. In his letters he ranked it as the largest and most compact Indian town he had ever encountered, with large, well-built houses. US Indian agent Benjamin Hawkins also visited the town and described the Yuchi as "more orderly and industrious" than the other tribes of the Creek Confederacy. The Yuchi began to move on, some into the Florida panhandle.

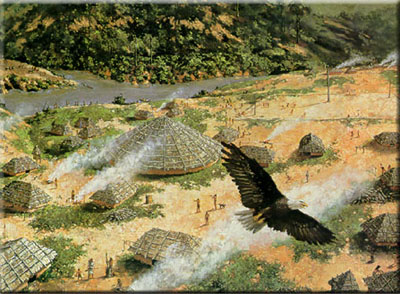
Yuchi Town, painting by Martin Pate (1990) of an 18th-century village, based on archaeological data. The site of Yuchi Town is within the area of present-day Fort Benning, Georgia.

In the late 18th century, English colonists noted Patsiliga, a settlement on the Flint River. Other Yuchi settlements may have been those villages noted on the Oconee River near Uchee Creek in Wilkinson County, Georgia, and on Brier Creek in Burke or Screven counties, also in Georgia. A Yuchi town was known to exist from 1746 to 1751 at the site of present-day Silver Bluff in Aiken County, South Carolina, which developed in the later 18th century.

During the 18th century, the Yuchi established an alliance with white settlers in the Southern Colonies, trading deerskins and Indian slaves with them. The Yuchi population plummeted during the 18th century due to Eurasian infectious diseases, to which they had no immunity, and to war with the Cherokee, who were moving into their territory. After the American Revolution, Yuchi people maintained close relations with the Creek Confederacy, into which federally recognized members were later absorbed. In the late 18th century, some Yuchi migrated south to Florida along with the Muscogee, where they became part of the newly formed Seminole people.

During the Creek War of 1813–1814, which overlapped the War of 1812, many Yuchi joined the Red Sticks party, traditionalists opposed to the Muscogee people of the Lower Towns, who had adopted aspects of European-American culture. Euchee Town decayed. The Yuchi tribe became one of the poorest of the Muscogee communities, at the same time gaining a bad reputation. The archaeological site of the town, designated a National Historic Landmark, is within boundaries of present-day Fort Benning, Georgia.

In the 1830s, the US government forcibly removed the Yuchi, along with the Muscogee, from Alabama and Georgia to Indian Territory (present day Oklahoma), west of the Mississippi River. The Yuchi settled in the north and northwestern parts of the Muscogee Nation. Three tribal towns which the Yuchi established there in the 19th century continue today: Duck Creek, Polecat, and Sand Creek.

== Second Seminole War ==
Prior to 1818 some Yuchi moved to near Lake Miccosukee in northern Florida, settling near Muscogee refugees. Andrew Jackson's invasion of the area during the First Seminole War resulted in the Yuchi moving to eastern Florida. They fought alongside the Seminole during the Second Seminole War under their chief Uchee Billy. He was captured in 1837 with his brother Jack by General Joseph Marion Hernandez, who also captured Osceola. The two leaders were imprisoned for years in Fort Marion in St. Augustine, Florida.

From 1890 to 1895, the Dawes Commission considered the Yuchi in Indian Territory to be an autonomous tribe. It registered tribal members preparatory to allotment of communal tribal lands in Indian Territory to individual households of members. Some 1,200 tribal members were registered in those years. The Dawes Commission later decided to legally classify the Yuchi as part of the Muscogee Nation, in an effort to simplify the process of land allotment. But this decision interrupted the autonomy of the people and their record of historical continuity as a recognized tribe.

== Current status ==
A Yuchi flute

The Yuchi people are enrolled in federally recognized tribes, particularly the Muscogee Nation, who host the Euchee Language Program.

In the 1990s, the Yuchi Tribal Organization based in Sapulpa, Oklahoma, petitioned the US federal government to gain federal recognition as an independent tribe. In 2000, the Bureau of Indian Affairs denied the petition.

As of 1997, the Yuchi tribe had a formal enrollment of 249 members. Other Yuchi descendants are already enrolled in other tribes, such as the Muscogee. Most Yuchi are of multi-tribal descent; some are citizens of other tribes, such as the Shawnee.

The Euchee Tribe of Indians, while not federally recognized, has their headquarters in Sapulpa, Oklahoma. Their tribal chairmen are co-chairs Felix Brown Jr. and Clinton Sago.

James Anaya, United Nations (UN) Special Rapporteur on the Rights of Indigenous Peoples, visited the Yuchi community. Tracie Revis (Yuchi) gave a speech defining the importance of federal recognition. He acknowledged the declaration by the UN on the Rights of Indigenous People that states "that we have the right of self-determination and by virtue of that right- we may freely determine our political status and freely pursue our economic, social and cultural development."

An estimated 2,000 persons are ethnically Yuchi. They are descendants of some 1,100 persons recorded by the Indian Claims Commission in 1950, which was settling compensation claims dating from allotments.

The Yuchi continue their important ceremonies, such as the Green Corn Ceremony of late summer. They maintain three ceremonial grounds in Oklahoma. Some members belong to the Native American Church and Methodist congregations.

In 2008, the Yuchi tribe received a grant from President George W. Bush's administration for a Native Americans Comprehensive Community Survey and Plan. The grant was used to developed the Tribal History Project, which began in October 2010.

The Human Genome Project acknowledged the importance of the Yuchi's distinct culture and language and approached the Yuchi in order to collect genetic data (DNA). The Yuchi tribe declined to participate in the Project due to cultural conflict and uncertainty among members over the uses of government ownership of tribal DNA.

== Yuchi language ==
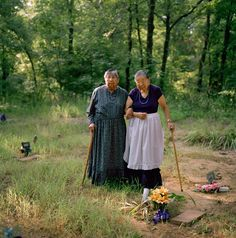
Sisters Maxine Wildcat Barnett (left) and Josephine Wildcat Bigler; two among the elderly speakers of Yuchi, visiting their grandmother's grave in a cemetery behind Pickett Chapel in Sapulpa, Oklahoma. According to the sisters, their grandmother had insisted that Yuchi be their first language.

The Yuchi language is a linguistic isolate, not known to be related to any other language. In 2000 the estimated number of fluent Yuchi speakers was 15, but this number dwindled to 7 by 2006. According to a 2011 documentary on the Yuchi language, the number of first-language speakers had declined to five by 2011.

Young Yuchi people have learned the language in recent years and are continuing to do so. Yuchi language classes are being taught in Sapulpa, Oklahoma, in an effort led by Richard Grounds and the Euchee Language Project. As of 2011, the Administration for Native Americans awarded the Yuchi tribe a grant for the years 2011 to 2014 in an effort to provide after-school programs for youth to improve proficiency in their native language and develop a young generation of speakers.

The Yuchi people and language are featured in a chapter in Mark Abley's Spoken Here: Travels Among Threatened Languages (2003), a book on endangered languages.

== Notable people ==
- Timpoochee Barnard, member of the Creek Nation Council
- Uchee Billy (died 1837), warrior and chief
- Sam Story, 19th-century chief
- Richard Ray Whitman (born 1949), artist, poet, actor

== See also ==
- Indigenous peoples of the Southeastern Woodlands
- Yuchi language
