= Yuchi language =

Indigenous language isolate from the Southeastern Woodlands, U.S.

Yuchi
- Euchee
- Tsoyaha
- Native to: United States
- Region: East central Oklahoma
- Ethnicity: 1,500 Yuchi (2007)
- Extinct: August 27, 2021, with the death of Maxine Wildcat Barnett
- Revival: 12 L2 speakers (2016)
- Language family: Language isolate
- Dialects: Duck Creek/Polecat; Bigpound

Language codes
- ISO 639-3: yuc
- Glottolog: yuch1247
- ELP: Yuchi
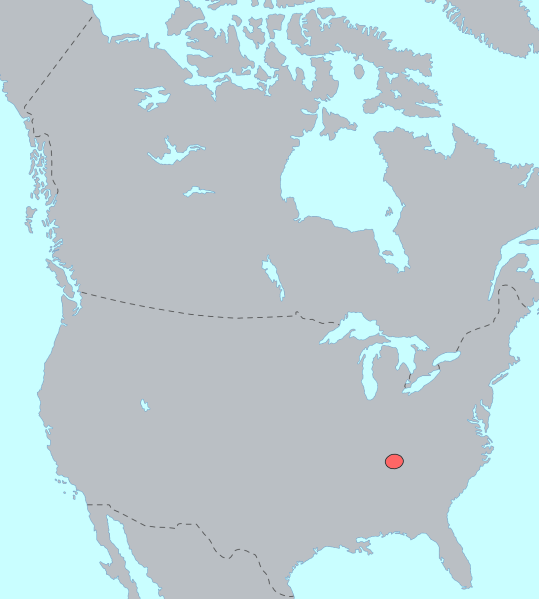
- Distribution of Yuchi at the time of European contact

Yuchi or Euchee (endonym: Tsohaya) is the language of the Yuchi people now living in Oklahoma. Historically, they lived in what is now known as the Southeastern United States, including eastern Tennessee, the western Carolinas, northern Georgia, and Alabama, during the period of early European colonization. Many speakers of the Yuchi language became allied with the Muscogee Creek when they migrated into their territory in Georgia and Alabama. They were forcibly relocated with them to Indian Territory in the early 19th century.

In 2009, linguist Mary Linn reported that there were approximately five fluent speakers of Yuchi remaining, and highlighted community-led efforts to teach the language to younger generations. Some audio tapes in the Yuchi language exist in the collections of the Columbus State University Archives in Columbus, Georgia.

== Classification ==
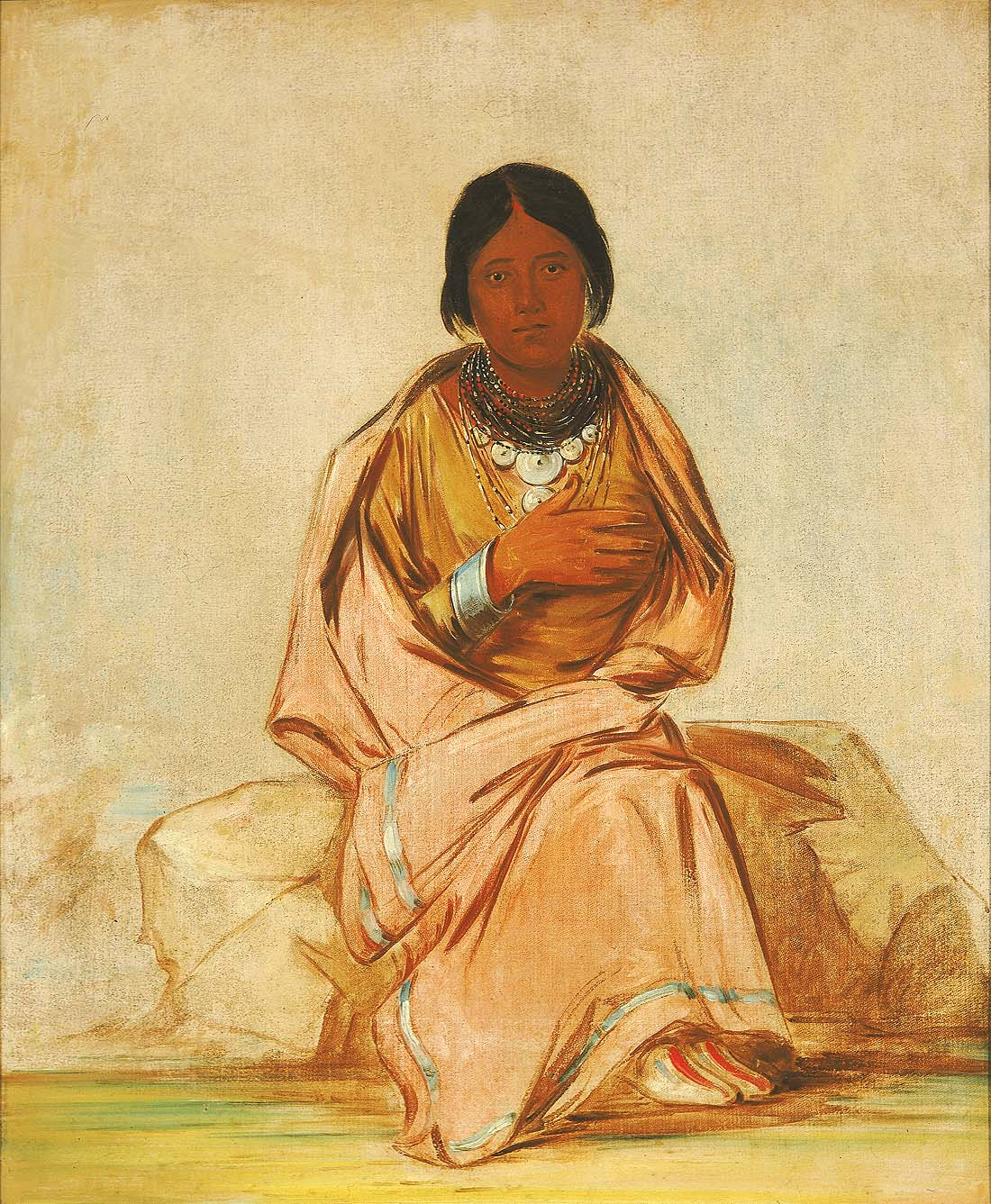
Cheeaexeco, a Yuchi woman, painted by George Catlin, 1838

Yuchi is classified as a language isolate, because it is not known to be related to any other language. Various linguists have claimed, however, that the language has a distant relationship with the Siouan family: Sapir in 1921 and 1929, Haas in 1951 and 1964, Elmendorf in 1964, Rudus in 1974, and Crawford in 1979.

== Geographic distribution ==
Yuchi is primarily spoken in northeastern Oklahoma, where Yuchi people live in present-day Tulsa, Okmulgee, and Creek counties, within the Muscogee (Creek) Nation's tribal jurisdictional area. In 1997, 12 to 19 elders spoke the language out of an estimated Yuchi population of 1,500 speakers. In 2009, only five fluent speakers, whose first language was not English, remained, and in 2011 only one.

== History ==
The Yuchi people lived in what is now Tennessee at the time of European contact. In the early 18th century, they moved to northwestern Georgia, now part of the southeastern United States, due to pressure from the powerful Cherokee. They later settled near the Muscogee (Creek) and formed an alliance with them. In the 1830s, speakers of the Yuchi language were forcibly relocated along with the Muscogee to Indian Territory.

=== Contradictions in linguistic study and linguistic history ===
The spoken Yuchi language has changed over time, in part due to relocation. In 1885 in an article in Science, Swiss linguist Albert S. Gatschet wrote about various linguistic idiosyncrasies in Yuchi. He said that adjectives are not expressed with number, but nouns are, by the addition of the particle ha (coming from the original term wahále 'many'), which made the word essentially plural. He also said that the language was no longer in an archaic state due to the lack of a "dual," and that the language had temporal and personal inflection. Gatschet did much field study and documentation regarding the language. Many of his original vocabulary lists can be found at the National Anthropological Archives or on their website.

In 1907, American Frank G. Speck published Ethnology of Yuchi Indians. He said that Yuchi had only one dialect, that inflection was not a characteristic, and that there were no true plurals. These conclusions contradict Gatschet's published 1885 study. The two authors did agree on linguistic idiosyncrasy, and the case of the third person.

In 1997, the Euchee United Cultural Historical Educational Efforts (E.U.C.H.E.E.) published a work entitled Euchees: Past and Present, providing more current information regarding the language. The organization claimed that there were two currently spoken dialects: the Duck Creek/Polecat and the Bigpond variations, which were spoken by Yuchi people of those communities in Oklahoma. This contradicts Speck's 1907 claim of one dialect.

== Current status ==
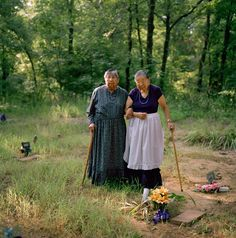
Sisters Maxine Wildcat Barnett (1925-2021) (left) and Josephine Wildcat Bigler (1921-2016); two of the last elderly speakers of Yuchi, visiting their grandmother's grave in a cemetery behind Pickett Chapel in Sapulpa, Oklahoma. According to the sisters, their grandmother had insisted that Yuchi be their native language.

Due to assimilation into Muscogee- and English-speaking culture, only a few elderly speakers of the Yuchi language were left by the 21st century.

Euchee Language Learning Center, near Kellyville, Oklahoma, in August 2026

In 2000 the estimated number of fluent Yuchi speakers was 15, but this number dwindled to 7 by 2006, 5 by 2010, and 4 by 2013. In 2016, Yuchi elder Josephine Wildcat Bigler died. Speaking Yuchi as her first language, she had been active in recording and preserving the language for future generations. Her sister, Maxine Wildcat Barnett, was the last tribal elder to speak fluent Yuchi, dying August 27, 2021.

The Yuchi Language Project (YLP) taught Yuchi classes in Sapulpa, Oklahoma, free of charge. The YLP opened the Yuchi Immersion School in 2018 where English is not spoken, despite an Oklahoma state law passed in 2010 declaring English the state's official language.

The Yuchi people and language are the subject of a chapter in Spoken Here: Travels Among Threatened Languages (2003), a book on endangered languages by Canadian writer Mark Abley.

== Phonology ==
The language has 49 sounds, 38 of which are consonants, and the remaining 11 are vowels. This number is more than twice that of most Southeastern Native American languages.

=== Vowels ===
Yuchi has oral and nasal vowels. Oral vowels are defined as being created by the raising of the soft palate to the nasopharyngeal wall, creating a velopharyngeal space within the oral cavity; nasal vowels, on the other hand, are typically defined as being created by the lowering of the soft palate, allowing air to escape through the nasal cavity.

Two vowel charts appears below. The vowels below represent the phonetic inventory, meaning the set of all (or most) sounds in the language. The phonemic inventory, those sounds which contrastively mark differences in meaning, are highlighted in the list below the vowel charts.

Oral Vowels
	Front	Central	Back
Close	i		ʊ, u
Close-mid	e		o
Mid		ə	
Open-mid	ɛ		ʌ, ɔ
Open	æ, a		

Nasal Vowels
	Front	Central	Back
Close	ĩ, ɪ̃		
Close-mid	ẽ		õ
Mid		ə̃	
Open-mid	ɛ̃		ɔ̃
Open	æ̃, ã		

The phonemic vowels of Yuchi are /i, u, e, o, æ, a, ĩ, ẽ, õ, æ̃, ã/; some levels of phonological or morphological variation must therefore be occurring in order for all of the sounds above to be possible.

==== Phonological variation ====
Phonological variation often occurs in different kinds of morphological environments. For example, the phoneme /o/ is often pronounced as /ʊ/ in 1st-person singular and impersonal 3rd-person pronouns by Big Pond speakers. Also, the phonemes /a/ and /o/ can become [ə] in unstressed environments.

==== Length ====
Vowel length indicates grammatical function, such as superlative or comparative adjective forms or emphasis. It may also indicate contracted morphemes, and thus is not a phonological process but rather a morphological one.

=== Consonants ===
Yuchi has been analyzed as having from 19 to 40 consonants, chiefly depending on whether the glottalized and labialized consonants are counted, or considered to be sequences with /ʔ/ and /w/, respectively. Some of the former are included in the table in parentheses:

		Labial	Alveolar		Palatal	Velar	Glottal
		Labial	plain	sibilant	Palatal	Velar	Glottal
Plosive/ Affricate	tenuis	p ⟨p⟩	t ⟨t⟩	ts ⟨ts⟩	tʃ ⟨ch⟩	k ⟨k⟩	ʔ ⟨'⟩
Plosive/ Affricate	aspirated	pʰ ⟨pʰ⟩	tʰ ⟨tʰ⟩	tsʰ ⟨tsʰ⟩	tʃʰ ⟨chʰ⟩	kʰ ⟨kʰ⟩	
Plosive/ Affricate	voiced	b ⟨b⟩	d ⟨d⟩	dz ⟨dz⟩	dʒ ⟨j⟩	ɡ ⟨g⟩	
Plosive/ Affricate	ejective	(pʼ ⟨p'⟩)	(tʼ ⟨t'⟩)	(tsʼ ⟨ts'⟩)	(tʃʼ ⟨ch'⟩)	(kʼ ⟨k'⟩)	
Fricative		f ⟨f⟩	ɬ ⟨ł⟩	s ⟨s⟩	ʃ ⟨sh⟩		h ⟨h⟩
Approximant		w ⟨w⟩	l ⟨l⟩		j ⟨y⟩		
Nasal		m ⟨m⟩	n ⟨n⟩				

=== Stress and intonation ===
==== Stress ====
Stress in Yuchi is fairly regular. All major parts of speech have syllable-final stress, and syllable-initial secondary stress; also, particles (one-syllable words) are stressed. There are some minimal pairs to be found due to stress; some representative samples include:

[ˈɡopʼa] – "Creek person, tribe"
[ɡoˈpʼa] – "go see someone"
[ˈsɛt ˀne] – he sees
[sɛt ˈˀne] – she sees
[ʃaˈja] – "weeds"
[ˈʃaja] – "squirrel"

As mentioned above, most nouns have syllable-final primary stress; there are, however, some regularized exceptions to this rule, the most common of which are nouns with lexicalized suffixes in the stem, which have stress on the penultimate syllable. Also, contractions within compounded nouns have primary stress on the contraction. There are various other exceptions, but the two mentioned above are the most frequent and the most important in helping us to understand why Yuchi nouns often appear to have irregular stress patterns.

Both regular and non-regular stress patterns are exemplified below, all glossed. All data come from Wagner, 1974, unless otherwise noted.

[ɡojalinɛʔ] – young man
[jacɛsiʔ] – sparks of fire
[tsɛʔ] – water
[saʔ] – earth
[tsoonɔʔ] – the sun
[ʔaˈɡale] ~ [aɡæle] – today, morning
[tsɛˈkʰale] – misty rain
[kʼɔndi] – meat

Verb stems typically have primary stress on the ultimate syllable, as well. The two major exceptions are reduplicated verbs, which have equal stress on both the last and reduplicated syllables of the stem, and verb compounds with the head root /ju/, in which primary stress is syllable-initial. Some examples include:

[ɡetaʔ] – to hold it up
[taʔtaʔ] – light

==== Intonation ====
Intonation varies depending upon the kinds of sentences being uttered. Declarative, negative, and command speech acts have falling intonation, while information questions and yes/no questions have rising pitch. Morphologically, intonation can also change the reception of a word and its intended meaning, as we see in the following example of three different intonation patterns for the word "What":

[wikæ] – "What?" (requesting information)
[wíkæ ↘] – "What?" (didn't hear)
[wikæ ↘] – "What?" (frightened/surprised)

==== Contractions ====
One of the most significant aspects of Yuchi morphophonology is the prevalence of contractions. Contraction should not here be taken to mean only a shortening of words; rather, it is more useful to think of contraction as a deletion of sounds that in turn affects surrounding vowels.

What can be contracted is dependent upon two major factors, the sound which begins the contracted syllable, and the stress of the syllable. In order for a syllable to be contracted, it must begin with a [+sonorant] consonant, that is, a voiced sound with a relatively free passage of air. In Yuchi, this includes sounds such as /n/, /ˀn/, /w/, /ˀw/, /j/, /ˀj/ (where /ˀ/ indicates a glottalized sound), the fricative /ˀh/, and /ʔ/. A syllable must also be unstressed in order to contract.

Contraction causes phonetic changes in the vowels directly preceding the deleted syllable. In order for Yuchi speakers to understand the grammatical features of the words being used in contracted forms, vowel features alternate to match the deleted sounds. So, for example, if the morpheme /ne/ was contracted, the vowel preceding it would become nasalized to indicate that a nasal sound has been lost.

Contraction must necessarily come before the phonetic change in vowels. For example, consider the following word:

[di ˀlɛ nɛp ʔá jɛ] – 'Did you look in the box?'

/nɛ/ can contract here because it is an unstressed syllable beginning with a sonorant: [di ˀlɛ mp ʔá jɛ]. CCC clusters are relatively rare, occurring in only six variations as noted by Wolff, four of them beginning with fricatives; such a construction as above would therefore likely be odd to speakers of Yuchi.

Contractions take on several forms and occur in many other environments. Those seeking additional information about the many kinds of contraction in Yuchi are advised to seek out Dr. Mary Linn's "A Grammar of Euchee."

A list of the most commonly contracted morphemes is below, along with their grammatical function.

- ne-: 2nd-person singular actor
- we-: 3rd-person non-Yuchi actor or patient, singular or plural
- 'o-: 3rd-person plural Yuchi actor or patient (women's speech)
- hi-: 3rd-person inanimate patient, singular or plural
- ho-: 3rd-person inanimate patient and participant, singular or plural
- 'yu-: verb root
- -ne-: habitual aspect
- -e: active verbalizer

== Orthography ==
The language had no standard orthography until the 1970s, when linguists James Crawford and Addie George (Yuchi) created a phonetic transliteration. Yuchi people have adopted this to write the language.

== Grammar ==
Like many Indigenous languages of the Americas, Yuchi grammar is agglutinative. Words are formed by the addition of various prefixes and suffixes to a stem. Yuchi features separate male and female registers and an idiosyncratic noun classification system wherein nominal distinction is made regarding animacy, Yuchi ethnicity, kinship and, for inanimate nouns, shape or spatial position.

Much of the information in this section is drawn from Wagner (1938); some of Wagner's conclusions, particularly regarding his interpretation of Yuchi kinship terminology and certain aspects of his description of Yuchi pronouns, have been disputed.

=== Morphosyntax ===
Yuchi is an agglutinative language, in which words are pieced together from pre-existing morphemes to make entirely new words. The word order of the language is subject–object–verb.

The language uses clitics and particles to express a variety of things, including possessives, cases, affixes, ideas, locatives, instrumentals, simulatives, ablatives, and demonstratives.

=== Verbs ===
The Yuchi verb consists of a mono- or polysyllabic stem modified almost exclusively by suffixing. Yuchi features attributive verbs, which is to say that the language makes very little distinction between verbs and adjectives as parts of speech. For this reason, Yuchi verbs and adjectives are virtually identical.

==== Tense ====
The concept of temporal verb inflection is only weakly realized in Yuchi and corresponds more closely in some cases to aspect rather than tense. The past tense is generally expressed via suffixing of the verb stem.

- -djin incomplete past ("ate")
- -dji'nfwa complete past ("had eaten")
- -djinfa' habitual past ("used to eat")
- -djinfwadji'n emphatic past ("happened to eat")
- -djigo' uncertain past ("perhaps ate")

There are also two ways of expressing future tense. The first, which usually denotes intentions or events of the immediate future, is expressed by lengthening, stressing and nasalizing the final syllable of the verb stem. The second, pertaining to the distant future, is expressed by the suffix -e'le.

==== Modality ====
Modality of the verb is also expressed through suffixing.

- -no imperative ("go!")
- -wo exhortative ("should go")
- -go potential ("might go")
- -ho emphatic ("did go")
- -te ability ("can go")

=== Nouns ===
Nouns are classified according to a broad animate versus inanimate paradigm which is expressed using a variety of article suffixes. Within the animate class, nouns are further subdivided into two sub-classes. The first of these includes all humans belonging to the Yuchi tribe, and is itself further divided according to a very complex system of kinship relations and gendered speech registers. The second sub-class of animate nouns encompasses all human beings outside of the Yuchi tribe, as well as animals, and the sun and moon. The animate (Yuchi) suffixes express a very complex system of kinship and gendered speech, in much the same way as do third person pronouns.

- -no any male or female Yuchi (used by men and women)
- -sen'o any younger (for men, related) female (used by men and women)
- -s'en'o younger male relative (used by women only)
- -eno older female relative (used by men and women)
- -ono younger unrelated male or any other unrelated person (used by women only)
- -ino older male relative (used by women only)
- -weno' all other animate beings

Inanimate nouns are divided into three groups: vertical, horizontal, and round objects or those otherwise do not conform to either of the other two groups. Each of these groups is represented by a suffix.

- -fa vertical
- -'e horizontal
- -dji round

==== Number ====
The concept of plurality in Yuchi is not as strongly developed as in English, leading one early descriptivist to claim that Yuchi has "no true plural." Animate nouns can, however, be pluralized by the addition of suffixes that correspond closely to their singular counterparts. Although tribal affiliation and gender distinctions carry over into the plural, kinship does not.

- -he'no Yuchi tribe members (male speech)
- -o'no Yuchi tribe members (female speech)
- -we'no all other animate beings

Inanimate nouns can be made plural by the suffix -ha, which replaces the singular inanimate suffixes listed above.

In addition to suffixing, several words related to kinship are pluralized via reduplication of the stem.

=== Pronouns ===
The Yuchi pronoun is extremely complex. Except in a few emphatic forms, the pronoun is always suffixed to a verb or noun stem, and appears in eight distinct sets.

The first pronoun set, termed the Subjective Series, denotes the subject relationship of the pronoun to the verb. Series 1 and 2 are close variations that respectively represent a general and specific object, whereas the "independent series" represents freestanding pronouns.

Subjective Series
	Subject Series 1	Subject Series 2	Independent
1st Person Sing.	di-	do-	di
2nd Person Sing.	ne-	yo-	tse

Third person pronouns follow a complex pattern of kinship and gendered speech that corresponds very closely to the animate noun suffixes.

- ho- / ho- / hodi any male or female Yuchi (used by men and women)
- se- / sio- / sedi any younger (for men, related) female (used by men and women)
- s'e- / s'io- / s'edi younger male relative (used by women only)
- e- / eyo- / edi older female relative (used by men and women)
- o- / o- / odi younger unrelated male or any other unrelated person (used by women only)
- i- any older male relative (used by women only)
- we- / yo- / wedi' all animate, non-Yuchi beings

First person pronouns in the plural are inclusive and exclusive, and there are several kinship-specific third person forms.

	Subject Series 1	Subject Series 2	Independent
1st Person Pl.	o- / no-	o- / no-	odi' / nodi'
2nd Person Pl.	a-	a'yo-	a'dze

A few of the third person singular pronouns double as plural pronouns as well.

- ho- / ho- / hodi any male or female Yuchi (used by men and women)
- o- / o- / odi in the plural, refers to any younger Yuchi regardless of kinship or gender (used by women only)
- i- in the plural, refers to any older Yuchi regardless of kinship or gender (used by women only)
- we- / yo- / wedi' all animate, non-Yuchi beings

The next set, termed the Objective Series, denotes the direct or indirect object relationship of the pronoun to the verb. It otherwise functions identically to the Subjective Series; the two pronoun sets are distinguished by their relative positions within the verb complex.

Objective Series
	Direct Series 1	Direct Series 2	Indirect
1st Person Sing.	di-	do-	di
2nd Person Sing.	ne-	yo-	tse

The third person singular pronouns are identical to those of the Subjective Series.

- ho- / ho- / hodi any male or female Yuchi (used by men and women)
- se- / sio- / sedi any younger (for men, related) female (used by men and women)
- s'e- / s'io- / s'edi younger male relative (used by women only)
- e- / eyo- / edi older female relative (used by men and women)
- o- / o- / odi younger unrelated male or any other unrelated person (used by women only)
- i- any older male relative (used by women only)
- we- / yo- / wedi' all animate, non-Yuchi beings

	Direct Series 1	Direct Series 2	Indirect
1st Person Pl.	ondze- / ondzio-	ondzio- / nondzio-	ontso / nonsto
2nd Person Pl.	andze-	andzio-	aso

As above, the third person plural pronouns are identical to those of the Subjective Series.

- ho- / ho- / hodi any male or female Yuchi (used by men and women)
- o- / o- / odi in the plural, refers to any younger Yuchi regardless of kinship or gender (used by women only)
- i- in the plural, refers to any older Yuchi regardless of kinship or gender (used by women only)
- we- / yo- / wedi' all animate, non-Yuchi beings

==== Reflexive pronouns ====
Reflexive pronouns are amalgamations of the Objective Series 1 and Subjective Series 1 ("Reflexive Series 1") or Subjective Series 2 ("Reflexive Series 2") pronouns.

	Reflexive Series 1	Reflexive Series 2
1st Person Sing.	tse di-	do'-
2nd Person Sing.	nendze ne'-	yo'-

Reflexive third person pronouns function the same, in terms of kinship and gendered speech, as their non-reflexive counterparts.

- hode'- / hondio'- any male or female Yuchi (used by men and women)
- siode'- / siodio'- any younger (for men, related) female (used by men and women)
- s'iode'- / s'iodio'- younger male relative (used by women only)
- e'yode- / eyondio'- older female relative (used by men and women)
- ode'- / odio'- younger unrelated male or any other unrelated person (used by women only)
- yode'- / yondio'- any older male relative (used by women only)

Plural reflexive pronouns demonstrate clusivity in the first person, and are identical to non-reflexives in terms of kinship and gendered speech.

	Reflexive Series 1	Reflexive Series 2
1st Person Pl.	ondzeo'- / nondzeno'-	ondzeo'- / nondzeno'-
2nd Person Pl.	andzea'-	andzea'yo-

Plural reflexive pronouns function identically to their non-reflexive counterparts in the third person.

- hode'- / hondio'- any male or female Yuchi (used by men and women)
- ode'- / odio'- in the plural, refers to any younger Yuchi regardless of kinship or gender (used by women only)
- yode'- / yondio'- in the plural, refers to any older Yuchi regardless of kinship or gender (used by women only)

=== Other affixes ===
==== Instrumental prefixes ====
The relationship between an action and the instrument by which it is carried out is expressed via the prefix hi-. This prefix has become fused in some cases with certain verb stems, forming a sort of instrumental verbal compound of idiomatic meaning.

==== Locative affixes ====
The concept of location is important to the Yuchi verb complex. Similar in some ways to the English preposition, these prefixes denote the location or direction of the verb's action.

Locative Prefixes
Prefix	Gloss
a-	static location
ti-	inside of an object
f'o-	inside the earth or under water
toya-	into water
ta-	on top of
po-	under
kya-	through
la-	out of
pe-	above or over
yu-	up in the air
ya-	across

Additionally, there are four very general locative suffixes that can be used in place of the prefixes listed above.

Locative Suffixes
Suffix	Gloss
-he	on, at, away from
-le	along, back to
-ke	over there
-fa	to, towards

=== Negation ===
An entire verbal complex can be negated using one of two prefixes, na- or ha-, both of which are identical in meaning.

=== Interrogatives ===
In direct speech wherein the sentence does not begin with an interrogative pronoun, interrogatives are formed with the suffix -le. If the question implies some action in the future, the suffix -yi is used instead.

== Works cited ==
- Ballard, William L. (1978). "More on Yuchi Pronouns". International Journal of American Linguistics. 44 (2): 103–112. doi:10.1086/465527. S2CID 143787970.
- Edmondson, Jerold (2011). Yuchi (Sound recording). Arlington: University of Texas.
- Gatschet, Albert S. (1885). "The Yuchi Tribe and its Language". Science. 5 (112): 253.
- Linn, Mary Sarah (2001). A Grammar of Euchee (Yuchi). Kansas City, KS: University of Kansas.
- Speck, Frank G. (1909). Ethnology of Yuchi Indians. Philadelphia: University Museum.
- Speck, Frank G. (1939). "Eggan's Yuchi Kinship Interpretations". American Anthropologist. 41 (1): 171–172. doi:10.1525/aa.1939.41.1.02a00330.
- Wagner, Gunther (1938). "Yuchi grammar". In Boas, Franz (ed.). Handbook of American Indian Languages. Vol. 3. pp. 300–374.
- Wolff, Hans (1948). "Yuchi Phonemes and Morphemes, with Special Reference to Person Markers". International Journal of American Linguistics. 14 (4): 240–243. doi:10.1086/464011. JSTOR 1262878. S2CID 143409598.
