= Armed Occupation Act =

1842 act granting land to Florida settlers

- Long title: An Act to provide for the armed occupation and settlement of the unsettled part of the peninsula of East Florida
- Nicknames: Florida Armed Occupation Act
- Enacted by: the 27th United States Congress
- Effective: August 4, 1842

Citations
- Statutes at Large: 5 Stat. 502

Codification
- Acts repealed: Homestead Act of 1862

Legislative history
- Introduced in the Senate by Thomas Hart Benton; Signed into law by President John Tyler on August 4, 1842

The Florida Armed Occupation Act of 1842 (5 Stat. 502) was passed by Congress as an incentive to increase the white population of Florida.

The Act granted 160 acres (0.6 km^{2}) of unsettled land south of the line separating townships 9 and 10 South (an east–west line about three miles (4.8 km) north of Palatka and about ten miles (16 km) south of Newnansville) to any head of a family as long he satisfied the following conditions:

- be a white male resident of Florida and not having 160 acres (0.6 km^{2}) of land in Florida when asking for the permit;
- get a permit from the Lands Office;
- he or his heirs reside for five consecutive years on the grant;
- clear, enclose and cultivate 5 acres (20,000 m^{2}) of land during the first year;
- build a house on the lot during the first year;
- the land should be two or more miles away from a garrisoned military post.

The total land to be granted should not be more than 200,000 acres (810 km^{2}) under the act.

== See also ==
- Frederick Weedon – the first person to receive a permit for land under the Act
- Mosquito County
- Second Seminole War
- Southern Homestead Act of 1866
