= Frederick Weedon =

U.S. Army contract surgeon (1784–1857)

Frederick R. Weedon
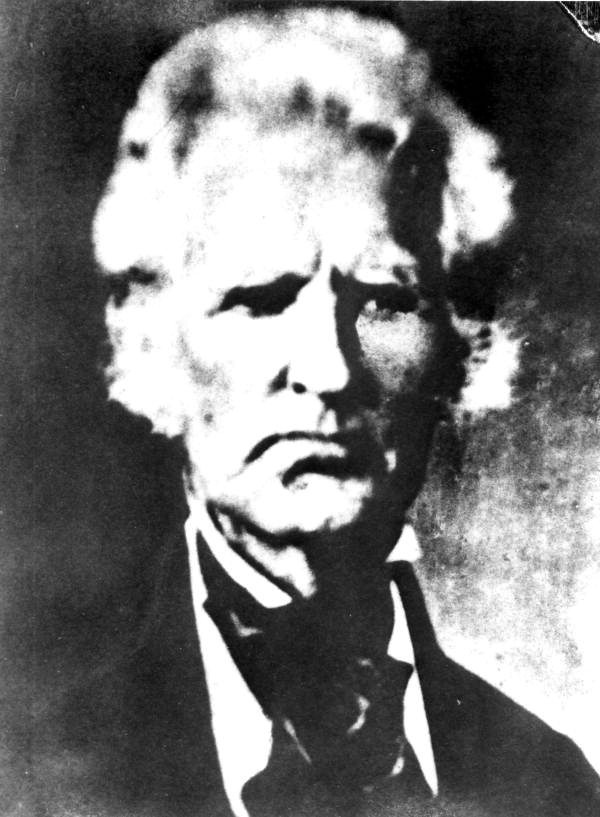
- Born: c. 1784; Maryland
- Died: c. 1857; St. Lucie County, Florida

Frederick R. Weedon (1784–1857) was a contract surgeon to the U.S. Army during the Second Seminole War and was the physician who attended to the ailing Seminole warriors Osceola and Uchee Billy after their capture, and was notorious for decapitating their corpses after they died. Weedon was born in Maryland, moved to Alabama and then the Florida Territory where he was the first to receive a permit for land under the Armed Occupation Act of 1842 in Mosquito County (today that area is St. Lucie County).

Weedon was the son of Sarah Sands and William Weedon who served as a colonel during the American Revolutionary War. Weedon himself served in the U.S. Army during the War of 1812. His son, Hamilton Moore Weedon, followed in his father's footsteps and became a physician. He served in the Fourth Florida Infantry of the Confederate States Army and was later in charge of the Confederate hospital in Eufaula, Alabama during the American Civil War.

== See also ==
- Armed Occupation Act
