= Charles Henry Coe =

Florida newspaperman and author

Charles Henry Coe (February 3, 1856 – March 23, 1954) was a newspaperman, photographer, government official, and author in the United States. He wrote about the Seminoles, the New Smyrna Sugar Mill Ruins, and other aspects of Florida history.

== Biography ==
He was born in Torrington, Connecticut to William Henry Coe (1824–1879) and Deborah Little Archer Coe (1824–1912). His father ran a newspaper and founded Glencoe, Florida.

He established The Florida Star in 1877 and The Highlands Star in 1890. He worked for the Government Printing Office and was an amateur archaeologist. He took tintype photographs.

In his book Red Patriots he quoted Joshua R. Giddings who wrote Exiles of Florida and cited Helen Hunt Jackson's A Century of Dishonor. He dedicated the book to Women's National Indian Association General Secretary Amelia S. Quinton.

He wrote magazine articles on natural history and archaeology, often exploring from his boat The Buccaneer. The 5-ton boat was a former U.S. Navy cabin cruiser. He married and had a son Mayne Reid Coe (1888–1980).

Charles Henry Coe died in West Palm Beach, Florida on March 23, 1954, and was buried at Woodlawn Cemetery.

== Books ==
- Red Patriots: The Story of the Seminoles (1898)
- Word of Lincoln
- Juggling a Rope (1927)
- The Art of Knife Throwing (1931)
- Debunking the So-Called Spanish Mission (1941)
- Life and Adventures of Capt. Mayne Reid, co-author
