= Joe Dan Osceola =

Seminole chief (1936–2019)

Seminole leader

Personal details
- Born: December 20, 1936
- Died: June 9, 2019 (aged 82)
- Spouse: Linda Joyce Tiger (m. 1964; div. 1980)
- Children: 10

Chief Joe Dan Osceola (December 20, 1936 – June 9, 2019) was the chief and ambassador of the Seminole Nation of Florida. He was the appointed Seminole Tribal Ambassador, who held the position of the youngest Chief and Tribal President, elected in Seminole history. Chief Joe Dan Osceola was the great-great-great-grandson of Chief Osceola, "Unconquered Chief".

Joe Dan excelled in football, basketball and track, and in 1957 he became the first Florida Seminole to graduate from high school; he would later become the first to graduate college as well. Florida State University, whose athletic teams are nicknamed the "Seminoles", offered him a scholarship to play quarterback. Instead, he elected to attend Georgetown College in Kentucky, where he ran track and cross-country. He was a member of the Lambda Chi Alpha fraternity, remaining close to his fraternity brothers throughout his life.

After graduating, Joe Dan returned to the Brighton Reservation and worked with the federal government on Indian affairs. After being elected as the tribe's president and chief at the age of 30, he moved to the tribal headquarters on the Hollywood Reservation. He worked with the National Congress of American Indians, the biggest lobbyist group for Indians. He served as an Ambassador of the tribe.

Chief Joe Dan was bestowed with honorary doctorate degrees from Georgetown College and Florida State University because of his diligent work throughout the United States, as he was the youngest president of any Native American tribe in North America and founded the United Southeastern tribes, a coalition of the Seminole, Miccosukee, Cherokee and Choctaw tribes.
