= Fort Hanson =

- Fort Hanson was located approx. 13 Miles Southwest of St. Augustine, Florida. in United States
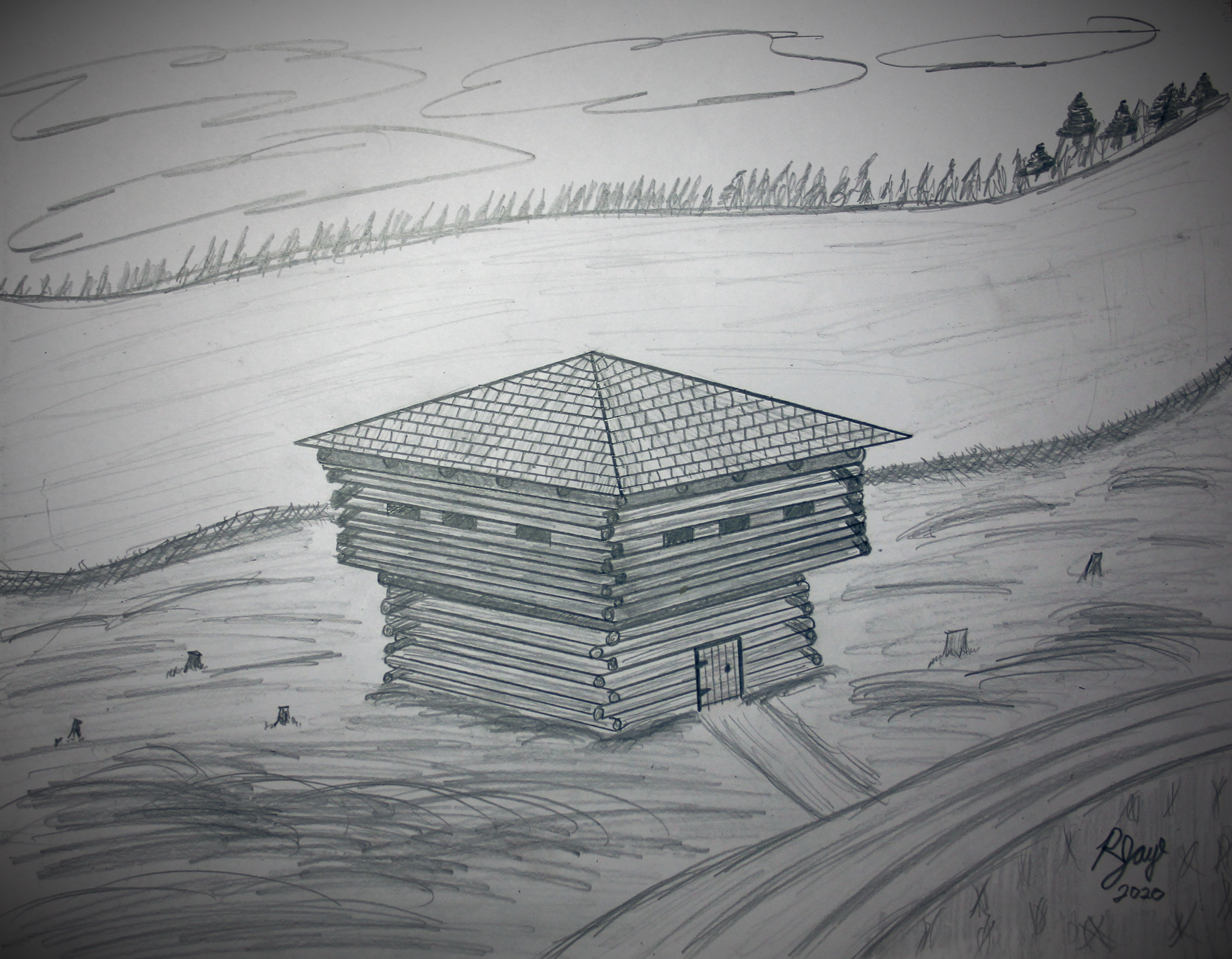
- Fort Hanson - Second Seminole War Fort (artist's depiction).

Site information
- Condition: Completely destroyed.

Location
- Location of Fort Hanson Fort Hanson (the United States)
- Coordinates: 29°40′54″N 81°26′28″W

Site history
- Built: 1838
- Built by: United States Army
- In use: 1838-1840
- Materials: Pine log blockhouse
- Fate: Abandoned in 1840 and burnt to the ground by the Seminole Indians and their allies.
- Battles/wars: None recorded.
- Events: Defense of St. Augustine during the Second Seminole War.

Garrison information
- Past commanders: R.H.K. Whitley, 1st Lt.
- Garrison: Regular army troops.

Fort Hanson was a blockhouse fortification built in 1838 by the United States Army as one of a chain of military outposts created during the Second Seminole War. These fortifications were located near vital road and waterway routes, or were built within a day’s journey of one another. Fort Hanson was primarily built for the protection of the St. Augustine area in the Florida Territory. St. Augustine had become refuge for many white settlers and their slaves that had fled from nearby settlements and plantations for safety in the city. In addition to St. Augustine being an important shipping port and supply center for the war effort the additional civilians made the city a key stronghold requiring a substantial military presence for its defense. The fort originally stood about thirteen miles southwest of St. Augustine.

== Brief history ==
Fort Hanson was established in 1838 by R.H.K. Whiteley, 1st Lt., 2d Artillery Regiment, and was garrisoned by regular U.S. Army troops. It was also tasked with providing reconnaissance and communications to warn U.S. Army troops stationed in St. Augustine of any Seminole Indian activity in its general vicinity. After only two years of service Fort Hanson was ordered abandoned on May 13, 1840, by the United States Secretary of War Joel Roberts Poinsett (1779-1851). Poinstett sent a correspondence to General Walker Keith Armistead (1773–1845), commander of the U.S. Army from 1840 to 1841, with orders to abandon two St. Augustine area forts: Fort Hanson and Fort Peyton. Fort Hanson was abandoned in 1840 and later burned to the ground by the Seminoles. No known attacks or skirmishes were recorded at Fort Hanson during the Second Seminole War.

== Fort Hanson’s Name ==
The fort is most likely named after Colonel John Hanson, a plantation owner of St. Augustine. The first post return shows up as March 1838, being garrisoned by the 2d Artillery Regiment. It is named after 1st Lieutenant Weightman Kay Hanson of the 7th Infantry Regiment because W.K. Hanson was recruiting in New York in 1838 and did not arrive in Florida or participate in the war until 1839 with his regiment.

== Site of Fort Hanson ==
Today, the actual site of Fort Hanson is unmarked. Its approximate location is known from historical records and maps, but no professional archaeological survey has been conducted to pinpoint its original location.

Historical records show the fort on the south side of Deep Creek on the west side of the St. Johns River, protecting the road that goes between Picolata and Palatka.
