= Glencoe, Florida =

- CDP
- Location in Volusia County and the state of Florida
- Coordinates: 29°00′03″N 80°57′44″W
- Country: United States
- State: Florida
- County: Volusia

Area
  - Total: 3.47 sq mi (8.99 km^{2})
  - Land: 3.47 sq mi (8.99 km^{2})
  - Water: 0 sq mi (0.00 km^{2})
- Elevation: 20 ft (6.1 m)

Population (2020)
  - Total: 2,170
  - Density: 625/sq mi (241.4/km^{2})
- Time zone: UTC-5 (Eastern (EST))
  - Summer (DST): UTC-4 (EDT)
- FIPS code: 12-26000
- GNIS feature ID: 2402528

Glencoe is a census-designated place (CDP) in Volusia County, Florida, United States. As of the 2020 census, Glencoe had a population of 2,170.

== Geography ==
According to the United States Census Bureau, the CDP has a total area of 6.42 square miles (16.64 km^{2}), of which 6.39 square miles (16.55 km^{2}) is land, and 0.037 square miles (0.095 km^{2}) (0.57%) is water.

== Demographics ==
Historical population
| Census | Pop. | Note | %± |
|---|---|---|---|
| 2020 | 2,170 | | — |
U.S. Decennial Census

=== 2020 census ===
As of the 2020 census, Glencoe had a population of 2,170. The median age was 52.0 years. 17.2% of residents were under the age of 18 and 23.5% of residents were 65 years of age or older. For every 100 females there were 93.9 males, and for every 100 females age 18 and over there were 91.6 males age 18 and over.

76.5% of residents lived in urban areas, while 23.5% lived in rural areas.

There were 913 households in Glencoe, of which 20.6% had children under the age of 18 living in them. Of all households, 45.7% were married-couple households, 19.2% were households with a male householder and no spouse or partner present, and 24.9% were households with a female householder and no spouse or partner present. About 26.9% of all households were made up of individuals and 15.9% had someone living alone who was 65 years of age or older.

There were 983 housing units, of which 7.1% were vacant. The homeowner vacancy rate was 3.0% and the rental vacancy rate was 9.3%.

Racial composition as of the 2020 census
| Race | Number | Percent |
|---|---|---|
| White | 2,009 | 92.6% |
| Black or African American | 20 | 0.9% |
| American Indian and Alaska Native | 8 | 0.4% |
| Asian | 15 | 0.7% |
| Native Hawaiian and Other Pacific Islander | 0 | 0.0% |
| Some other race | 7 | 0.3% |
| Two or more races | 111 | 5.1% |
| Hispanic or Latino (of any race) | 61 | 2.8% |

=== 2000 census ===
As of the census of 2000, there were 2,485 people, 975 households, and 740 families residing in the CDP. The population density was 125.4 people/km^{2} (325 people/mi^{2}). There were 1,033 housing units at an average density of 52.1 units/km^{2} (135 units/mi^{2}). The racial makeup of the CDP was 97.99% White, 1.09% African American, 0.16% Native American, 0.12% Asian, 0.04% Pacific Islander, and 0.60% from two or more races. Hispanic or Latino of any race were 0.97% of the population.

There were 975 households, out of which 31.3% had children under the age of 18 living with them, 61.5% were married couples living together, 10.2% had a female householder with no husband present, and 24.1% were non-families. 18.9% of all households were made up of individuals, and 8.8% had someone living alone who was 65 years of age or older. The average household size was 2.54 and the average family size was 2.86.

In the CDP, the population was spread out, with 23.0% under the age of 18, 6.3% from 18 to 24, 26.9% from 25 to 44, 27.2% from 45 to 64, and 16.7% who were 65 years of age or older. The median age was 42 years. For every 100 females, there were 99.9 males. For every 100 females age 18 and over, there were 95.4 males.

The median income for a household in the CDP was $36,915, and the median income for a family was $45,958. Males had a median income of $36,383 versus $23,793 for females. The per capita income for the CDP was $21,816. About 4.6% of families and 5.6% of the population were below the poverty line, including 2.5% of those under age 18 and 4.3% of those age 65 or over.
