= Fort Caben =

Former fort in Florida, USA

- Location within Florida Location within the United States
- Alternative names: Fort Caven (most likely an historical misspelling).

General information
- Type: Second Seminole War Fort
- Architectural style: Log Blockhouse Fortification
- Location: Bunnell, Florida, Section 38, Township 13- South, Range 29 East, on Fish Hawk Point.
- Coordinates: 29°24′09″N 81°28′02″W
- Completed: 1834
- Demolished: 1839

Fort Caben was a Second Seminole War fort in Flagler County, Florida. In 1958, a report listing Flagler County historical sites, compiled for Florida Governor Thomas LeRoy Collins (1909–1991) and the State Park Board, stated, "'Fort Caben' was built for defense against the Indians – about 1834. No trace left. [It was] probably a wood building. Location: Section 38, Township 13 – South, Range 29 East, on Fish Hawk Point."

== Brief history ==
Fort Caben was built on the banks of Crescent Lake (near St. Johns Park in present-day Flagler County, Florida) by the U.S. Army during the Second Seminole War to prevent Seminole Indian raiding parties, that were traveling on boats and canoes on the St. Johns River, from attacking and looting the numerous plantations that were located south of St. Augustine. Fort Caben was most likely a blockhouse style fortification as it was located near a waterway, and the area provided a vast number of trees for building materials.

== Operations ==
Fort Caben was likely occupied by U.S. Army troops on a part-time basis during the Second Seminole War for training, reconnaissance and defensive purposes. Many of these smaller and remote forts were not defended on a full-time basis as troops were regularly relocated to areas where there was Seminole Indian activity during the Second Seminole War. No known attacks or skirmishes were recorded at Fort Caben.

== Fate ==
Fort Caben was most likely abandoned, and burned down, sometime around 1839 as no mention of it after this time is documented. Today, the site of Fort Caben is in a densely wooded and secluded area and would most likely require Lidar technology and an experienced archaeologist to locate the exact spot where it was built.
