= Osceola =

Seminole leader (1804–1838)

- Vsse Yvholv
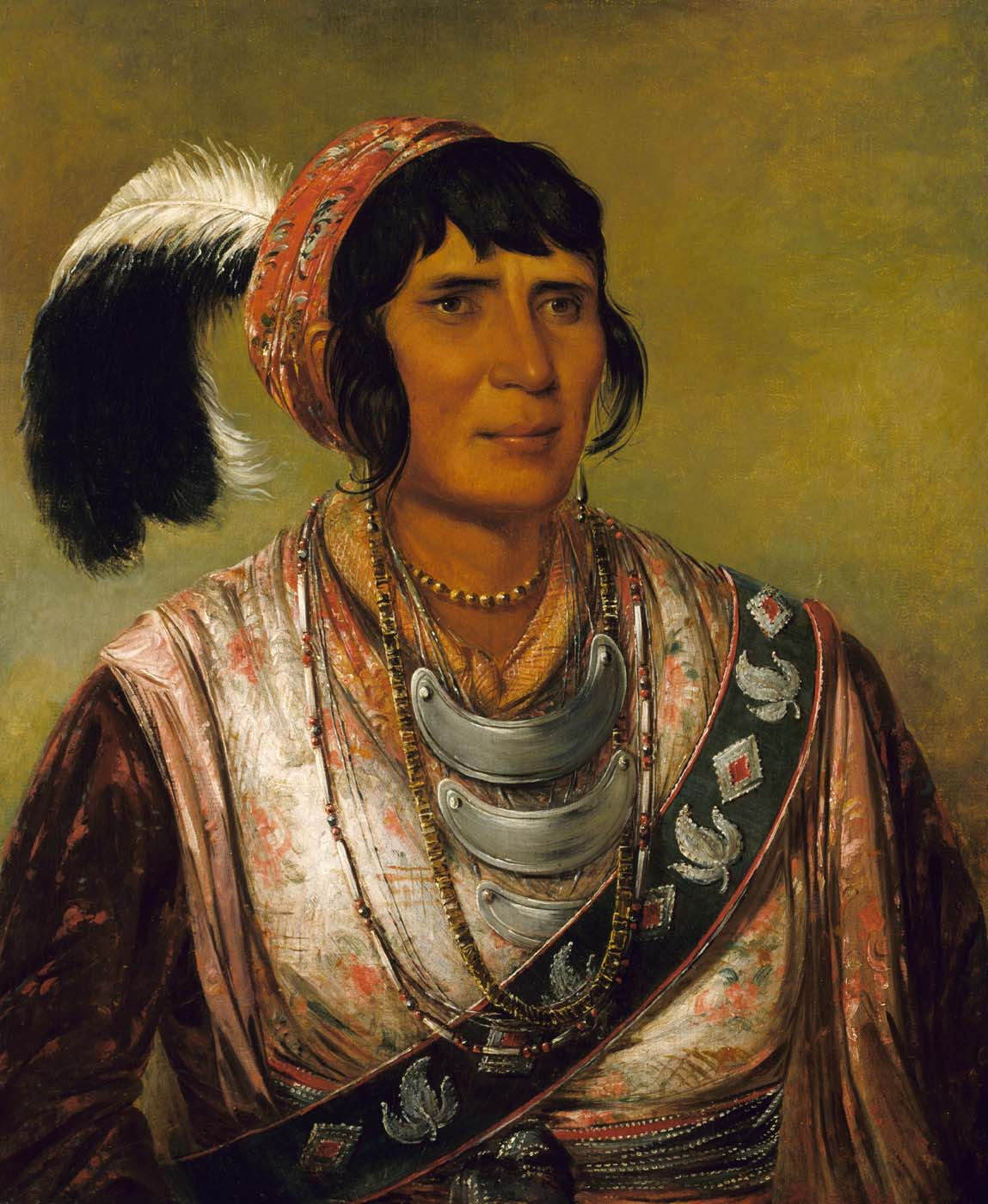
- Portrait by George Catlin, 1838

Seminole leader

Personal details
- Born: 1804 Talisi, Mississippi Territory, US
- Died: January 30, 1838 (aged 33–34) Fort Moultrie, South Carolina, US
- Resting place: Fort Moultrie, South Carolina, US
- Children: at least five
- Parent(s): Polly Coppinger and William Powell
- Nickname: Billy Powell

Osceola (1804 – January 30, 1838, Vsse Yvholv in Creek, also spelled Asi-yahola), named Billy Powell at birth, was an influential leader of the Seminole people in Florida. His mother was Muscogee, and his great-grandfather was a Scotsman, James McQueen. He was reared by his mother in the Creek (Muscogee) tradition. When he was a child, they migrated to Florida with other Red Stick refugees, led by a relative, Peter McQueen, after their group's defeat in 1814 in the Creek Wars. There they became part of what was known as the Seminole people.

In 1836, Osceola led a small group of warriors in the Seminole resistance during the Second Seminole War, when the United States tried to remove the tribe from their lands in Florida to Indian Territory west of the Mississippi River. He became an adviser to Micanopy, the principal chief of the Seminole from 1825 to 1849. Osceola led the Seminole resistance to removal until he was captured on October 21, 1837, by deception, under a flag of truce, when he went to a site near Fort Peyton for peace talks. The United States first imprisoned him at Fort Marion in St. Augustine, then transported him to Fort Moultrie in Charleston, South Carolina. He died there a few months later of causes reported as an internal infection or malaria. Because of his renown, Osceola attracted visitors in prison, including renowned artist George Catlin, who painted perhaps the most well-known portrait of the Seminole leader.

== Early life ==
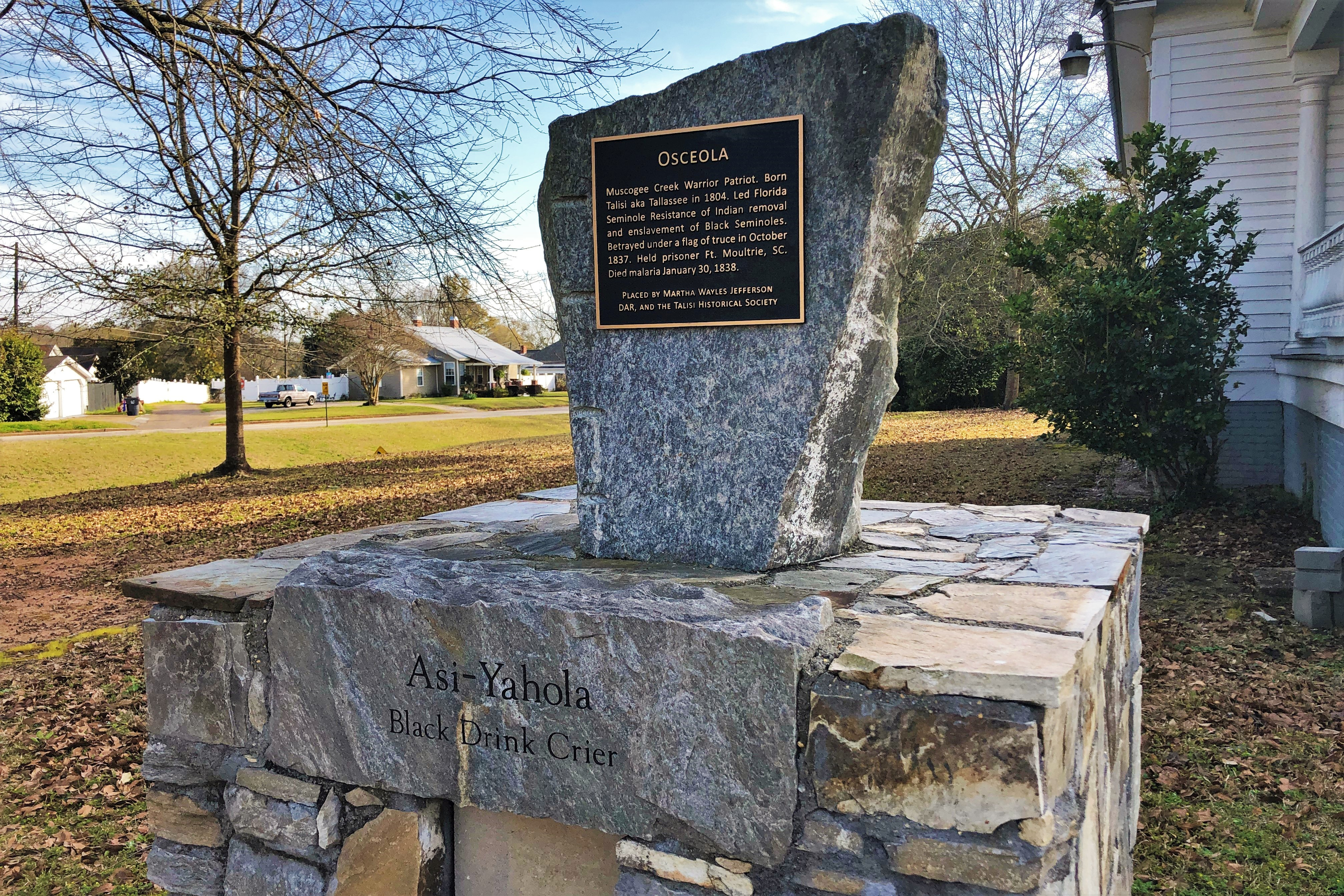
Historical monument honoring Osceola near his birthplace in Tallassee, Alabama.

Osceola was named Billy Powell at his birth in 1804 in the Upper Creek village of Talisi, which means "Old Town". The village site, now the city of Tallassee, Alabama, was located on the banks of the Tallapoosa River about 20 miles (32 km) upstream from Fort Toulouse where the Tallapoosa and the Coosa rivers meet to form the Alabama River. The residents of the original Talisi village and of the current city of Tallassee were a mixture of several ethnicities. The Muscogee Creek were among the Indigenous peoples of the Southeastern Woodlands, and some of them held enslaved black people. Powell was believed to have ancestors from all of these groups. His mother was Polly Coppinger, a mixed-race Creek woman, and his father was most likely William Powell, a Scottish trader.

Polly was also of Muscogee and European ancestry, as the daughter of Ann McQueen and Jose Coppinger. Because the Muscogee had a matrilineal kinship system, Polly and Ann's children were all born into their mother's clan. They were reared by their mothers and their maternal male relatives following Muscogee cultural practices, and they gained their social status from their mother's people. Ann McQueen was also mixed-race Muscogee Creek; her father, James McQueen, was Scottish. Ann was probably the sister or aunt of Peter McQueen, a prominent Muscogee leader and warrior. Like his mother, Billy Powell was raised in the Muscogee Creek confederacy.

Billy Powell's maternal grandfather, James McQueen, was a ship-jumping Scottish sailor who in 1716 became the first recorded white person to trade with the Muscogee Creek Confederacy in Alabama. He stayed in the area as a fur trader and married into a Muscogee family, becoming closely involved with these people. He was buried in 1811 at the Indian cemetery in Franklin, Alabama, near a Methodist missionary church for the Muscogee.

In the telling of an 1872 history of Macon County, Alabama, "Between Ufaupee and Chattabogue (Red creek), and on the railroad, is the birth-place of Ussa-yohola or Oceola ("Black-Drink"), the famous Seminole chief, who made the Everglades of Florida the last stronghold of his race east of the Mississippi. He was a son of an Englishman, name Powell, and of Polly Copinger, a mixed-breed grand-daughter of James McQueen, a Scotchman who died in 1811. McQueen was born in 1693, and deserted from a British ship at St. Augustine in 1716, as he told Col. Hawkins; died at the age of 128 years, and is buried on Ufaupee. Oceola was a blood-thirsty chief, brave and relentless in his hostility. He was decoyed into the American camps, by promises of amnesty, and died in chains at Fort Moultrie. Macon feels a pride in him."

In 1814, after the Red Stick Muscogee Creeks were defeated by United States forces, Polly took Osceola and moved with other Muscogee refugees from Alabama to Florida, where they joined the Seminole. In adulthood, as part of the Seminole, Powell was given his name Osceola (/ˌɒsiːˈoʊlə/ or /ˌoʊseɪˈoʊlə/). This is an anglicized form of the Creek Vsse Yvholv (pronounced [asːi jahoːla]), a combination of vsse, the ceremonial black drink made from the yaupon holly, and yvholv, often translated "shouter" but referring specifically to the one who performs a special whoop at the Green Corn Ceremony or archaically to a tribal town officer responsible for offering the black drink.

In April 1818, during the First Seminole War, Osceola and his mother where living in Peter McQueen's village near the Econfina River, when it was attacked and destroyed by the Lower Creek allies of U.S. General Andrew Jackson that were led by William McIntosh (see the Battle of Econfina River). Many surviving Red Stick warriors and their families, including McQueen, retreated south into the Florida peninsula.

In 1821, the United States acquired Florida from Spain (see the Adams-Onis Treaty), and more European-American settlers started moving in, encroaching on the Seminoles' territory. After early military skirmishes and the signing of the 1823 Treaty of Moultrie Creek, by which the U.S. seized the northern Seminole lands, Osceola and his family moved with the Seminole deeper into the unpopulated wilds of central and southern Florida.

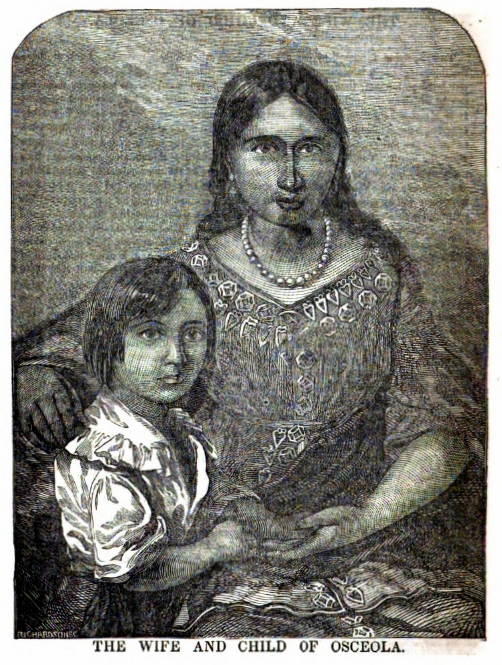
"The Wife and Child of Osceola" from Holden's Dollar Magazine, volume 6, no. 4 (October 1850): 591–592.

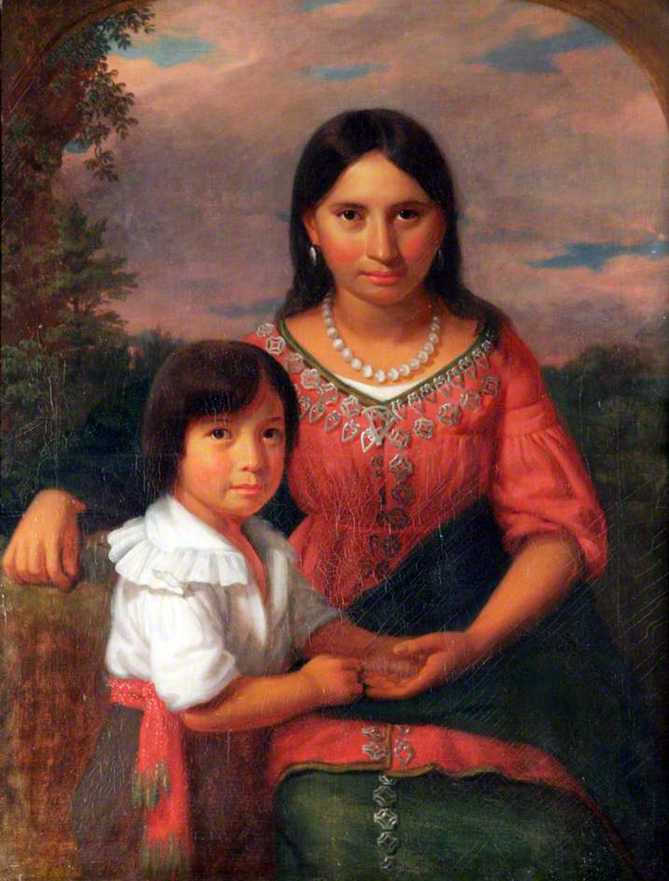
The Sedgeford Hall Portrait, once believed to represent Matoaka (Pocahontas) and her son, has been re-identified as being Pe-o-ka (wife of Osceola) and their son.

As an adult, Osceola took two wives, as did some other high-ranking Muscogee and Seminole leaders. With them, he had at least five children. One of his wives was black, and Osceola fiercely opposed the enslavement of free people. Lt. John T. Sprague mentions in his 1848 history The Florida War that Osceola had a wife named "Che-cho-ter" (Morning Dew), who bore him four children.

== 1830s resistance and war leader ==
Osceola stabbing the treaty with his dagger. Statue in Silver Springs, Florida

Through the 1820s and 1830s American settlers continued pressuring the US government to remove the Seminole from Florida to make way for their desired agricultural development. In 1832, a few Seminole chiefs signed the Treaty of Payne's Landing, by which they agreed to give up their Florida lands in exchange for lands west of the Mississippi River in Indian Territory. According to legend, Osceola stabbed the treaty with his knife, although there are no contemporary reports of this. Donald L. Fixico, an American Indian historian, says he made a research trip to the National Archives to see the original Treaty of Fort Gibson (also known as the Treaty of Payne's Landing), and that upon close inspection, he observed that it had "a small triangular hole shaped like the point of a knife blade."

Five of the most important Seminole chiefs, including Micanopy of the Alachua Seminole, did not agree to removal. In retaliation, the US Indian agent, Wiley Thompson, declared that those chiefs were deposed from their positions. As US relations with the Seminole deteriorated, Thompson forbade the sale of guns and ammunition to them. Osceola, a young warrior rising to prominence, resented this ban. He felt it equated the Seminole with slaves, who were forbidden by law to carry arms.

Thompson considered Osceola to be a friend and gave him a rifle. Osceola had a habit of barging into Thompson's office and shouting complaints at him. On one occasion Osceola quarreled with Thompson, who had the warrior locked up at Fort King for two nights until he agreed to be more respectful. In order to secure his release, Osceola agreed to sign the Treaty of Payne's Landing and to bring his followers into the fort. After his humiliating imprisonment, Osceola secretly prepared vengeance against Thompson.

On December 28, 1835, Osceola, with the same rifle Thompson gave him, killed the Indian agent. Osceola and his followers shot six others outside Fort King, while another group of Seminole ambushed and killed a column of US Army, more than 100 troops, who were marching from Fort Brooke to Fort King. Americans called this event the Dade Massacre. These nearly simultaneous attacks catalyzed the Second Seminole War with the United States.

In April 1836, Osceola led a band of warriors in an attempt to expel U.S. forces and laid siege to Fort Cooper. The fortification was built on the west bank of Lake Holathikaha as an outpost for actions against the local Seminole population. Despite running low on food, the U.S. garrison had enough gunpowder and ammunition to keep the Seminoles from taking the fort before reinforcements arrived.

== Capture and death ==
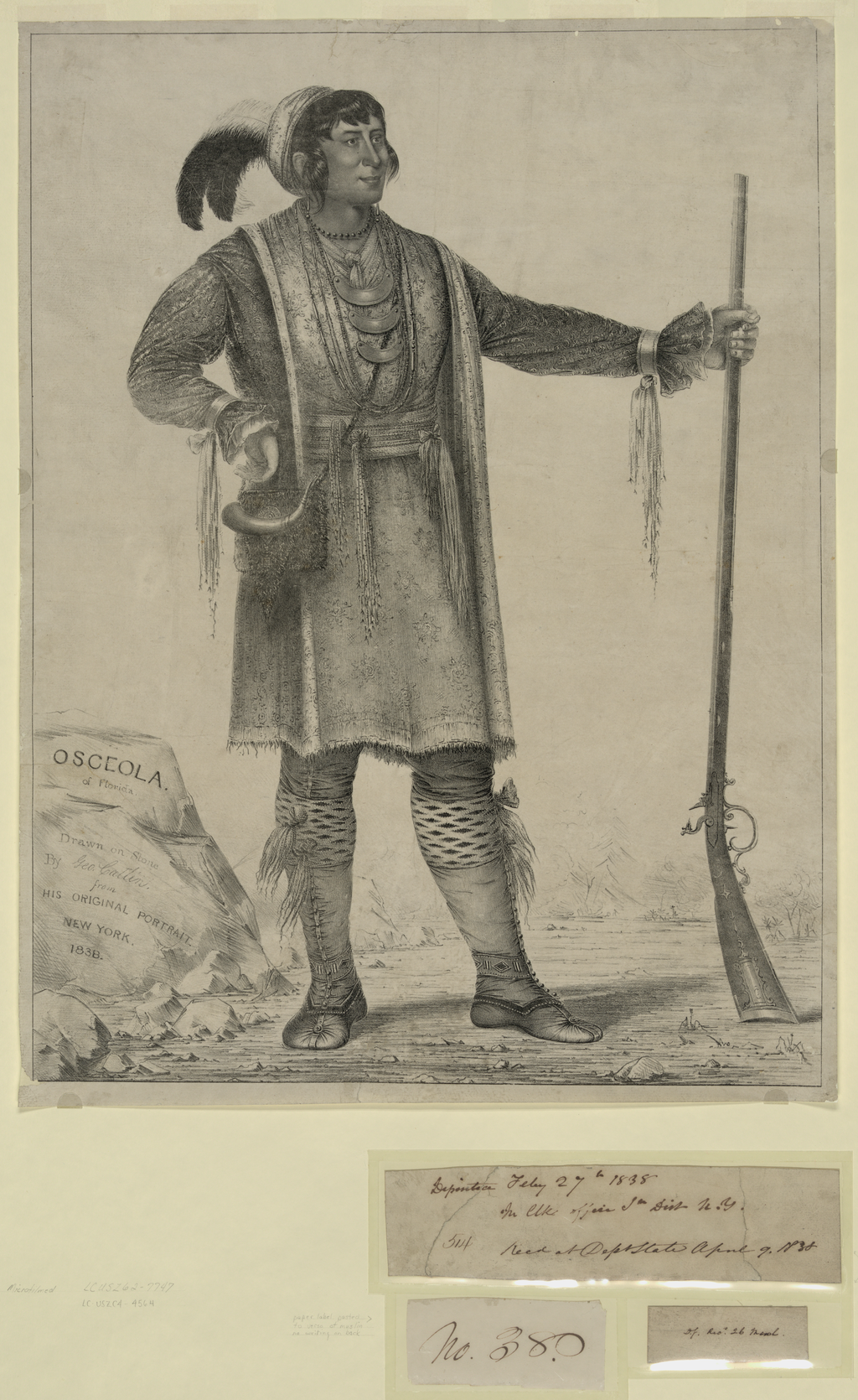
Osceola of Florida, Drawn on Stone by Geo. Catlin, from his Original Portrait

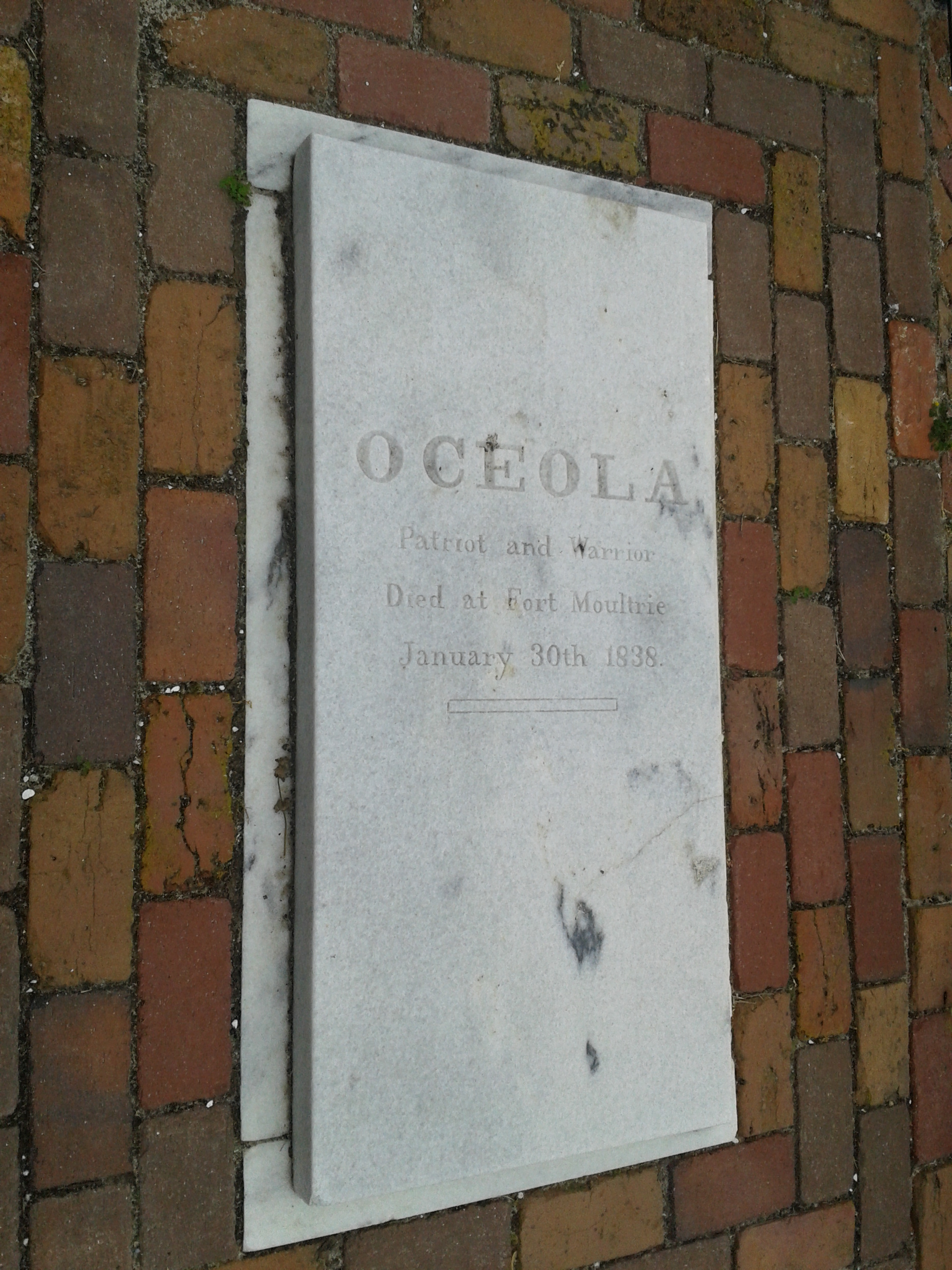
Osceola's grave at Fort Moultrie

On October 21, 1837, Osceola and 81 of his followers were captured by General Joseph Hernández on the orders of General Thomas Jesup, under a white flag of truce, when they went for peace talks to Fort Peyton near St. Augustine. He was initially imprisoned at Fort Marion in St. Augustine, before being transferred to Fort Moultrie on Sullivans Island, outside Charleston, South Carolina. Osceola's capture by deceit caused a national uproar. General Jesup's treacherous act and the administration were condemned by many congressional leaders and vilified by international press. Jesup suffered a loss of reputation that lasted for the rest of his life; his betrayal of the truce flag has been described as "one of the most disgraceful acts in American military history."

That December, Osceola and other Seminole prisoners were moved to Fort Moultrie. They were visited by various townspeople. The portraitists George Catlin, W. M. Laning, and Robert John Curtis, the three artists known to have painted Osceola from life, persuaded the Seminole leader to allow his portrait to be painted despite his being gravely ill. Osceola and Curtis developed a close friendship, conversing at length during the painting sessions; Curtis painted two oil portraits of Osceola, one of which remains in the Charleston Museum. These paintings have inspired numerous widely distributed prints and engravings, and cigar store figures were also based on them.

Osceola, having suffered from chronic malaria since 1836, and having acute tonsillitis as well, developed an abscess. When he was close to death, as his last wish he asked the attending doctor, Frederick Weedon, that his body be returned to Florida, his home, so that he might rest in peace. He died of quinsy on January 30, 1838, three months after his capture. Rather than honoring his last wish, Weedon cut off Osceola's head and buried his decapitated body, displaying the Seminole leader's head in his drug store. During the time Weedon had the head in his possession, he would often place it in the bedroom of his three sons as punishment for misbehavior. Weedon would later give the head to his son-in-law, Dr. Daniel Whitehurst, who gifted the head to Valentine Mott in 1843. Mott placed it in his Surgical and Pathological Museum, where it was presumed destroyed in a fire in 1866.

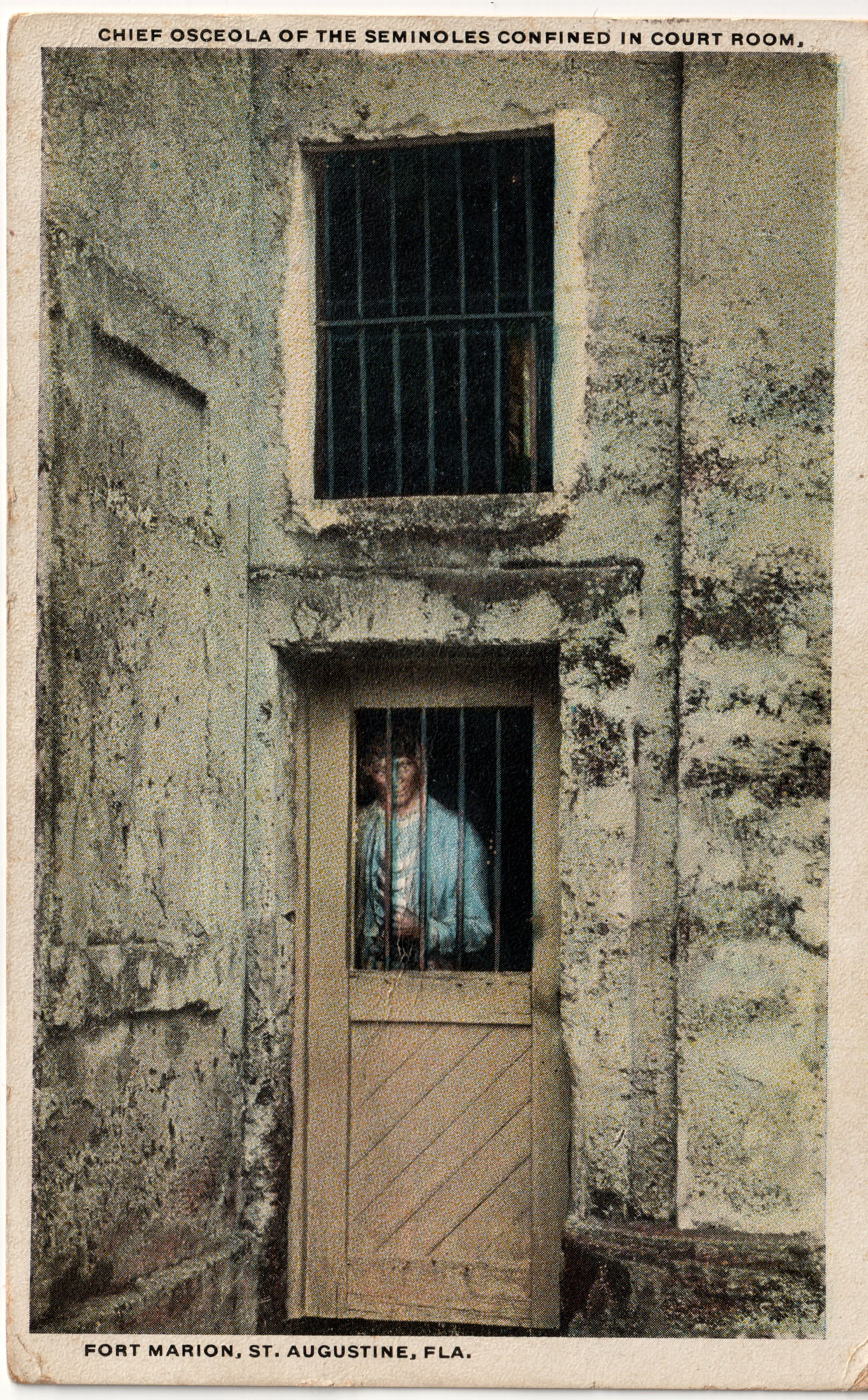
Chief Osceola depicted confined in court room on a postcard

== Legacy and honors ==
- Numerous landmarks and geographic locations have been named in his honor, such as counties in Florida, Iowa, and Michigan.
- The town of Osceola, New York, is named for him. The name was selected by Anna Maria Jay, the granddaughter of John Jay.
- Osceola, Arkansas, one of two county seats in Mississippi County
- Osceola, Indiana, a town
- Osceola, Iowa, county seat of Clarke County
- Osceola, Missouri, county seat of St. Clair County
- Osceola, Nebraska, county seat of Polk County
- Osceola, Wisconsin, a village
- Osceola Township, Renville County, Minnesota
- Florida's Osceola National Forest was named for him.
- Mount Osceola, located in the White Mountains of New Hampshire.
- Two lakes in Florida named Osceola, one located on the University of Miami campus in Coral Gables, and another in Winter Park.
- Battery Osceola at Fort Taylor, Key West, Florida, is named after him.
- Osceola Hall, a dormitory at Florida State University.
- Ocilla, a small town in southern Georgia, may have been named after him.
- The World War II Liberty Ship SS Chief Osceola was named in his honor.
- The U.S. Navy has named three vessels for him.
- Osceola is a symbol for Florida State University athletic teams.

== Descendants ==
- Chairman Joe Dan Osceola (1936–2019), ambassador of the Seminole Tribe, was Osceola's great-great-great grandson.

== Relics ==
According to the oral tradition of his descendants, Dr. Frederick Weedon was alone with the body and cut off Osceola's head, placing it in the coffin with the scarf that Osceola had customarily worn being wrapped around the neck, and immediately before the funeral ceremony removed the head and shut the coffin's lid. Weedon kept the head for himself, as well as other objects belonging to Osceola, including a brass pipe and a silver concho. Capt. Pitcairn Morrison, the U.S. Army officer in charge of the Seminole prisoners who had been transported with Osceola, made a last-minute decision to take other items belonging to Osceola. The historical evidence suggests that it was Morrison who decided that a death mask should be made, a European-American custom at the time for prominent persons, but it was done without the permission of Osceola's people. An acquaintance of Morrison, Dr. Benjamin Strobel, a native of Charleston, made a plaster cast of Osceola's face and upper torso. The process of "pulling" the first mold, which was soon displayed in the window of a Charleston drugstore, destroyed the original cast. Weedon apparently preserved Osceola's head in a large jar of alcohol and took it to St. Augustine, where he exhibited it in the family drugstore.

Captain Pitcairn Morrison sent the death mask and some other objects collected by Weedon to an army officer in Washington. By 1885, the death mask and some of Osceola's belongings were being held in the anthropology collection of the Smithsonian Institution. The death mask is currently housed in the Luce collection of the New-York Historical Society.

In 1966, Miami businessman Otis W. Shriver claimed he had dug up Osceola's grave and put his bones into a bank vault to rebury them at a tourist site at the Rainbow Springs in Marion County. Shriver traveled around the state in 1967 to gather support for his project. Archaeologists later proved that Shriver had dug up animal remains; Osceola's body was still in its coffin.

In 1979, the Seminole Nation of Oklahoma bought Osceola's bandolier and other personal items from a Sotheby's auction. Because of the chief's significance, over time some people have created forgeries of Osceola's belongings. Rumors persist that his embalmed head has been found in various locations.

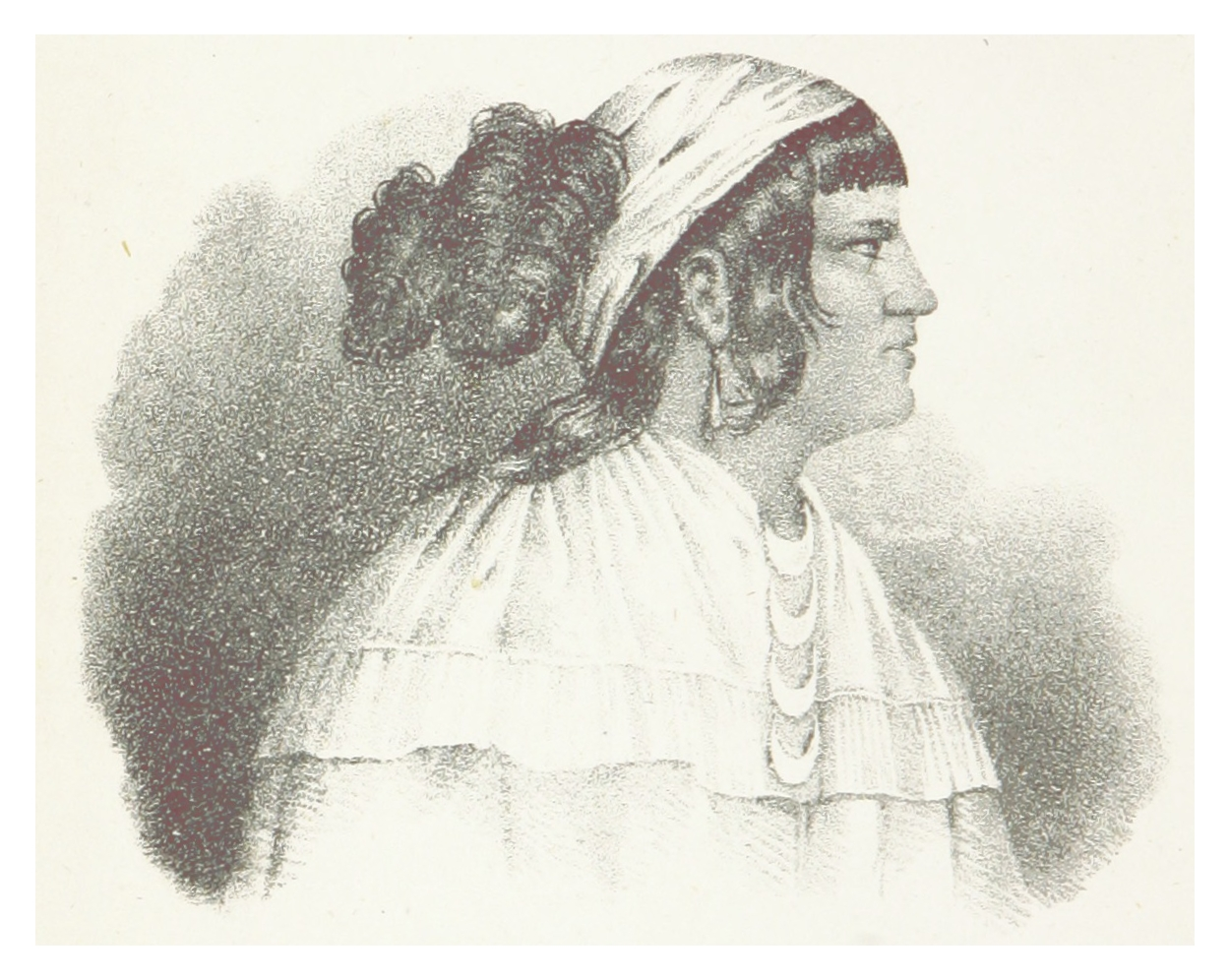
Osceola (1836 lithograph)

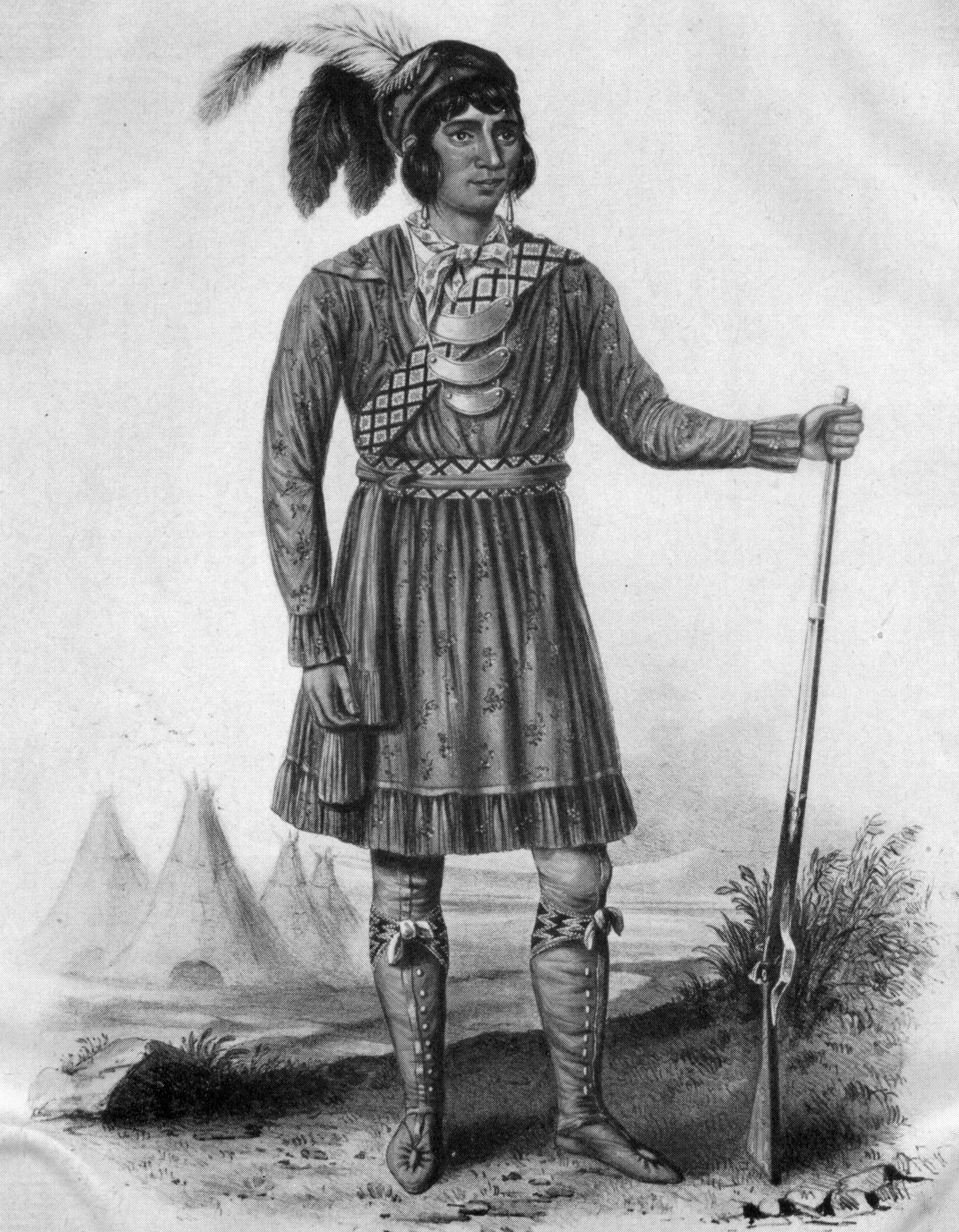
Osceola (1838 lithograph)

== Related media ==
=== Literature ===
- Osceola (1858) by Thomas Mayne Reid
- In the Wilds of Florida: A Tale of Warfare and Hunting (1880) by William Henry G. Kingston
- "Osceola" (1889), a poem by Walt Whitman, featured in Leaves of Grass.
- "Osceola" was an early pen name used by Danish author Karen Blixen (1885–1962), known primarily for her novels and stories set in Kenya during the colonial period. She also published as Isak Dinesen.
- War Chief of the Seminoles (1954), a children's book by May McNeer, is part of the Landmark Books series.
- Osceola, Häuptling der Seminole-Indianer (1963) by Ernie Hearting, is a German novel featuring Osceola and based on historical sources.
- In the alternate history novel The Probability Broach (1979), part of the North American Confederacy Series by L. Neil Smith, the United States becomes a Libertarian State after a successful Whiskey Rebellion and execution of George Washington. The figure of Osceola is featured as the ninth President of the North American Confederacy, serving from 1842 to 1848.
- Tourist Season (1986) and Nature Girl (2006), mystery novels by Carl Hiaasen, each give an abbreviated history of Osceola's capture and imprisonment, as well as that of his contemporary, Thlocklo Tustenuggee.
- Light a Distant Fire (1988) by Lucia St. Clair Robson
- Captive (1996), a historical-fiction book by Heather Graham, features Osceola as one of the protagonists.
- Freedom Land: A Novel (2003) by Martin L. Marcus. In this version, Osceola was the son of a respected British officer and his Creek consort.

=== Films ===
- In the mid-1930s Nathanael West wrote a 17-page film treatment entitled Osceola but failed to sell it to a studio.
- Seminole (1953), highly fictionalized American western film directed by Budd Boetticher and starring Anthony Quinn as Osceola.
- Naked in the Sun (1957), the life of Osceola and the Second Seminole War, starring James Craig as Osceola.
- Osceola – Die rechte Hand der Vergeltung (1971) by Konrad Petzold, an East German western with Gojko Mitić as the Native American leader.

=== Television, music, sports, and art ===
- The Sedgeford Hall Portrait (c. 1830), once thought to be of Pocahontas and her mixed-race son, Thomas Rolfe, is now believed to be of Pe-o-ka (a wife of Osceola) and their son.
- 1957 Jim Bowie TV-series episode "Osceola." When the army attempts to remove the Seminole Indians from their own lands to a less desirable tract, Bowie steps in on their behalf.
- The song "Seminole Wind", the title track of the album by the same name by John Anderson, refers to hearing the ghost of Osceola. The song has been covered by James Taylor and Gravemist.
- Osceola and Renegade are mascots of the Florida State Seminoles football team. The use of Osceola and Renegade as a symbol was approved by the Seminole Tribe of Florida.
