= List of counties in Florida =

Counties of Florida
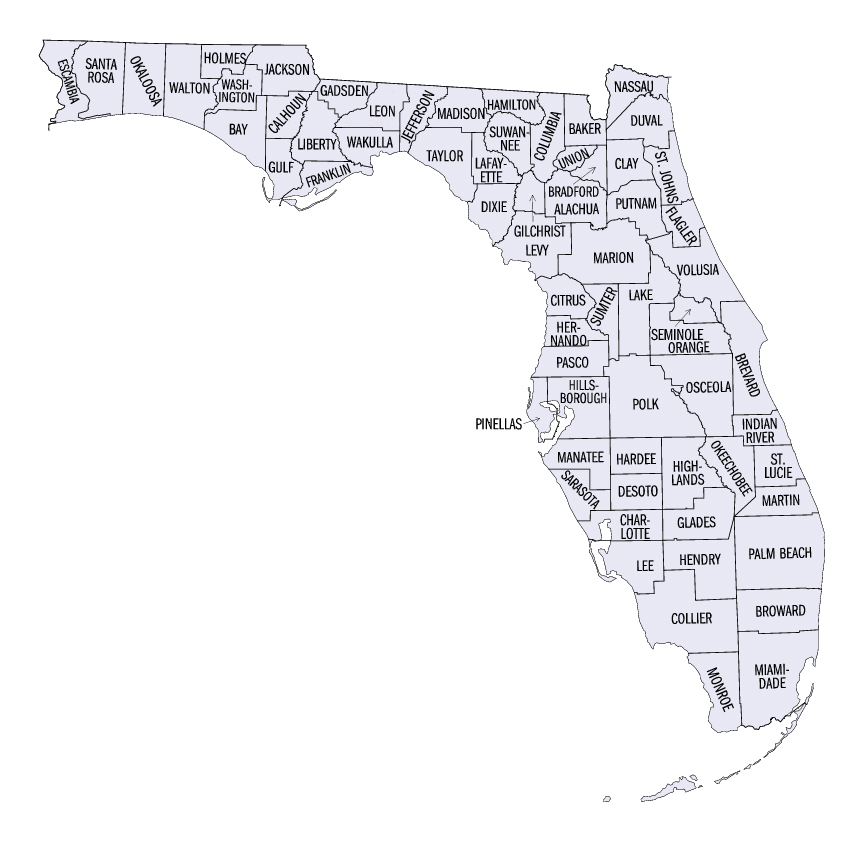
- Location: State of Florida
- Number: 67
- Populations: 8,035 (Liberty) – 2,802,029 (Miami-Dade)
- Areas: 240 square miles (620 km^{2}) (Union) – 2,034 square miles (5,270 km^{2}) (Palm Beach)
- Government: County constitutional officers
- Subdivisions: Communities

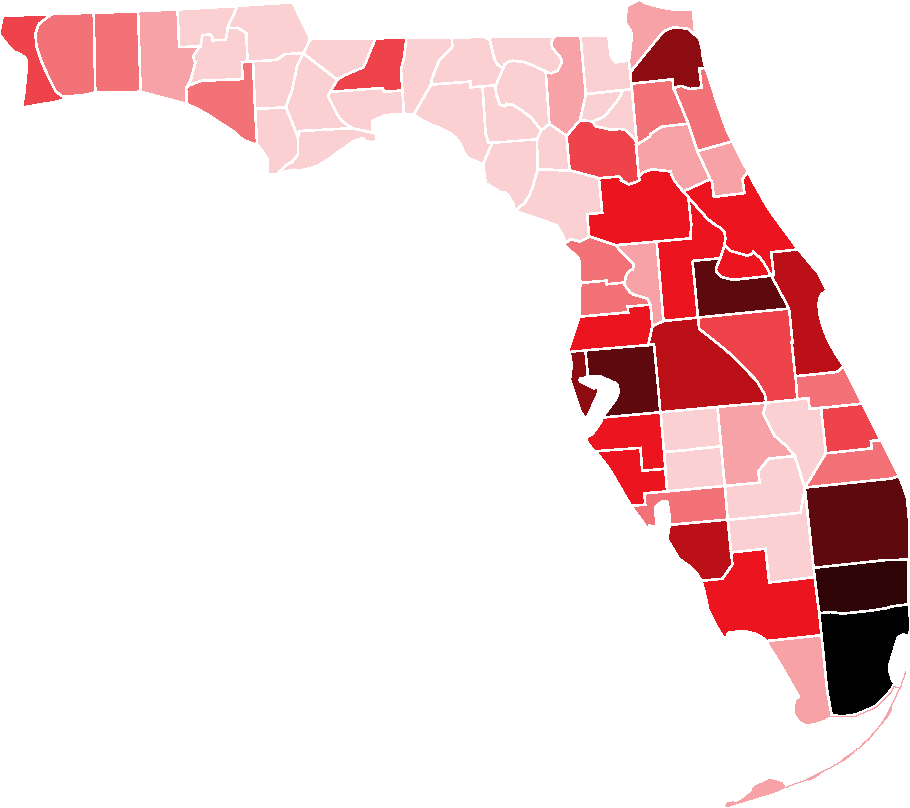
Population by county: 0–49,999 50,000–99,999 100,000–199,999 200,000–299,999 300,000–499,999 500,000–749,999 750,000–999,999 1,000,000–1,499,999 1,500,000–1,999,999 2,000,000+

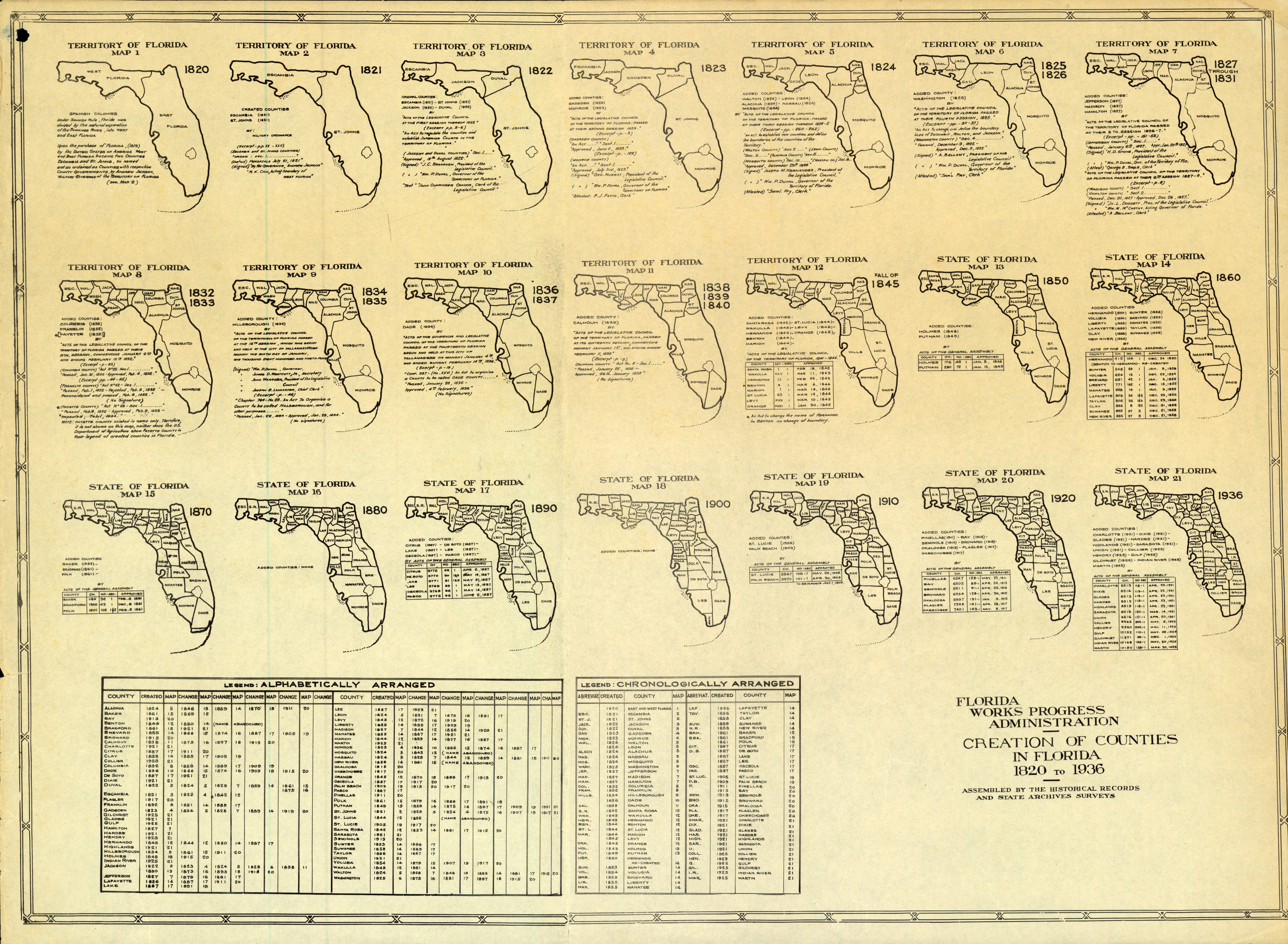
Florida counties 1820-1936

There are 67 counties in the U.S. state of Florida, which became a territory of the U.S. in 1821 with two counties complementing the provincial divisions retained as a Spanish territory, Escambia to the west and St. Johns to the east. The two counties were divided by the Suwannee River. All of the other counties were created later from these two original counties. Florida became the 27th U.S. state in 1845, and its last county was created in 1925 with the formation of Gilchrist County from a segment of Alachua County. Florida's counties are subdivisions of the state government. Florida's most populous county is Miami-Dade County, the seventh most populous county in the nation, with a population of 2,701,767 as of the 2020 census.

In 1968, counties gained the power to develop their own charters. All but two of Florida's county seats are incorporated municipalities: the exceptions are Crawfordville, county seat of rural Wakulla County, and East Naples, located outside Naples city limits in Collier County.

The names of Florida's counties reflect its cultural heritage. Some are named for Confederate political leaders and Spanish explorers, marking the influence of Spanish sovereignty, while others are named for Christian saints, Native American sites, as well as political leaders of the United States. Natural features of the region, including rivers, lakes and flora, are also commonly used for county names. Florida has counties named for participants on both sides of the Second Seminole War: Miami-Dade County is partially named for Francis L. Dade, a major in the U.S. Army at the time; Osceola County is named for the war's native Muscogee-Seminole resistance leader Osceola.

Population figures are based on the 2025 vintage Census population estimates. The population of Florida is 23,462,518, an increase of 8.9% from 2020. The average population of Florida's counties is 350,187; Miami-Dade County is the most populous (2,802,029) and Liberty County is the least (8,035). The average land area is 805 sq mi (2,085 km^{2}). The largest county is Collier County as per 2020 Census bureau of 1,998.32 sq mi.

The Federal Information Processing Standard (FIPS) is used by the U.S. government to uniquely identify counties and is provided for each entry. These codes link to the United States Census Bureau's "quick facts" for each county. Florida's FIPS code of 12 is used to distinguish from counties in other states. For example, Orange County's unique nationwide identifier is 12095.

Under the Florida Constitution the state government has the power to create and abolish counties. Each county in Florida is required to have a county seat under the state constitution.

== Counties ==
County	FIPS code	County seat	Est.	Formed from	Etymology	Density	Population	Area	Map
Alachua County	001	Gainesville	December 29, 1824	Duval and St. Johns	From a Seminole-Creek word meaning "jug", apparently in reference to the sinkholes common in the area	331.84	290,028	874 sq mi (2,264 km^{2})	A state map highlighting Alachua County in the corner part of the state. It is medium in size.
Baker County	003	Macclenny	February 8, 1861	New River	James McNair Baker (1821–1892), a Confederate senator and later a judge in the fourth judicial district	50.83	29,737	585 sq mi (1,515 km^{2})	A state map highlighting Baker County in the corner part of the state. It is medium in size.
Bay County	005	Panama City	July 1, 1913	Calhoun and Washington	St. Andrew's Bay, the central geographic feature of the county	267.64	204,479	764 sq mi (1,979 km^{2})	A state map highlighting Bay County in the panhandle part of the state. It is medium in size.
Bradford County	007	Starke	February 28, 1859	Columbia named New River until 1861	Richard Bradford, the first officer from Florida to die in the Civil War; he was killed during the Battle of Santa Rosa Island	96.61	28,307	293 sq mi (759 km^{2})	A state map highlighting Bradford County in the corner part of the state. It is small in size.
Brevard County	009	Titusville	March 14, 1844	Hillsborough and Mosquito named St. Lucie until 1855	Theodore Washington Brevard, early settler and later state comptroller from 1853 to 1861	652.24	663,982	1,018 sq mi (2,637 km^{2})	A state map highlighting Brevard County in the southeastern part of the state. It is medium in size and narrow in shape.
Broward County	011	Fort Lauderdale	October 1, 1915	Miami-Dade and Palm Beach	Napoleon Bonaparte Broward (1857–1910), 19th governor of Florida from 1905 to 1909	1665.27	2,013,317	1,209 sq mi (3,131 km^{2})	A state map highlighting Broward County in the southern part of the state. It is medium in size and shaped like a rectangle.
Calhoun County	013	Blountstown	January 26, 1838	Franklin, Jackson, and Washington	John C. Calhoun (1782–1850) leading Southern politician from South Carolina	23.44	13,289	567 sq mi (1,469 km^{2})	State map highlighting Calhoun County
Charlotte County	015	Punta Gorda	April 23, 1921	DeSoto	Charlotte of Mecklenburg-Strelitz, wife of King George III	312.99	217,212	694 sq mi (1,797 km^{2})	A state map highlighting Charlotte County in the southern part of the state. It is medium in size.
Citrus County	017	Inverness	June 2, 1887	Hernando	The county's citrus trees	293.95	171,666	584 sq mi (1,513 km^{2})	A state map highlighting Citrus County in the middle part of the state. It is medium in size.
Clay County	019	Green Cove Springs	December 31, 1858	Duval	Henry Clay (1777–1852), Secretary of State from 1825 to 1829 under John Quincy Adams	398.66	239,593	601 sq mi (1,557 km^{2})	A state map highlighting Clay County in the corner part of the state. It is medium in size.
Collier County	021	East Naples	July 7, 1923	Lee	Barron Collier (1873–1939), an advertising entrepreneur who developed much of the land in southern Florida	205.89	417,131	2,026 sq mi (5,247 km^{2})	A state map highlighting Collier County in the southern part of the state. It is large in size.
Columbia County	023	Lake City	February 4, 1832	Alachua	Christopher Columbus (c. 1451–1506), explorer of the Americas	92.97	74,094	797 sq mi (2,064 km^{2})	A state map highlighting Columbia County in the corner part of the state. It is medium in size and narrow in shape.
DeSoto County	027	Arcadia	May 19, 1887	Manatee	Hernando de Soto (c. 1496/1497–1542), a Spanish explorer and conquistador	58.21	37,078	637 sq mi (1,650 km^{2})	A state map highlighting DeSoto County in the southern part of the state. It is small in size and rectangular in shape.
Dixie County	029	Cross City	April 25, 1921	Lafayette	Dixie, the common nickname for the Southern United States	25.62	18,038	704 sq mi (1,823 km^{2})	A state map highlighting Dixie County in the corner part of the state. It is medium in size.
Duval County	031	Jacksonville	August 12, 1822	St. Johns	William Pope Duval (1784–1854), the first governor of the Florida Territory	1373.34	1,062,963	774 sq mi (2,005 km^{2})	A state map highlighting Duval County in the corner part of the state. It is medium in size.
Escambia County	033	Pensacola	July 21, 1821	One of the two original counties	Disputed origin; possibly from the Creek or Choctawword Shambia, meaning "clear water", or from Spanish word "cambiar", meaning to barter	502.76	333,834	664 sq mi (1,720 km^{2})	A state map highlighting Escambia County in the westernmost part of the state. It is medium in size and narrow in shape.
Flagler County	035	Bunnell	June 12, 1917	St. Johns and Volusia	Henry Morrison Flagler (1830–1913), founder of the Florida East Coast Railway	289.40	140,360	485 sq mi (1,256 km^{2})	A state map highlighting Flagler County in the corner part of the state. It is medium in size.
Franklin County	037	Apalachicola	February 8, 1832	Gadsden and Washington	Benjamin Franklin (1706–1790), one of the Founding Fathers of the United States of America	24.40	13,029	534 sq mi (1,383 km^{2})	A state map highlighting Franklin County in the northwestern part of the state. It is medium in size.
Gadsden County	039	Quincy	June 24, 1823	Jackson	James Gadsden (1788–1858), American diplomat and namesake of the Gadsden Purchase	85.85	44,298	516 sq mi (1,336 km^{2})	A state map highlighting Gadsden County in the northwestern part of the state. It is medium in size.
Gilchrist County	041	Trenton	January 1, 1926	Alachua	Albert W. Gilchrist (1858–1926), the 20th governor of Florida	58.70	20,488	349 sq mi (904 km^{2})	A state map highlighting Gilchrist County in the corner part of the state. It is small in size.
Glades County	043	Moore Haven	April 23, 1921	DeSoto	The Florida Everglades	17.14	13,270	774 sq mi (2,005 km^{2})	A state map highlighting Glades County in the southern part of the state. It is medium in size.
Gulf County	045	Port St. Joe	July 7, 1925	Calhoun	The Gulf of Mexico	28.22	15,943	565 sq mi (1,463 km^{2})	A state map highlighting Gulf County in the northwestern part of the state. It is medium in size.
Hamilton County	047	Jasper	December 26, 1827	Jefferson	Alexander Hamilton (1757–1804), the first United States Secretary of the Treasury and a Founding Father	27.53	14,180	515 sq mi (1,334 km^{2})	A state map highlighting Hamilton County in the corner part of the state. It is medium in size.
Hardee County	049	Wauchula	April 23, 1921	DeSoto	Cary A. Hardee (1876–1957), governor of Florida at the time of creation of Hardee County	40.71	25,932	637 sq mi (1,650 km^{2})	A state map highlighting Hardee County in the middle part of the state. It is medium in size and shaped like a rectangle.
Hendry County	051	LaBelle	July 10, 1923	Lee	Francis A. Hendry (1833–1917), early Floridian pioneer and politician	41.87	48,276	1,153 sq mi (2,986 km^{2})	A state map highlighting Hendry County in the southern part of the state. It is medium in size.
Hernando County	053	Brooksville	April 24, 1843	Alachua and Hillsborough named Benton from 1844 to 1850	Hernando de Soto (c. 1496/1497–1542), a Spanish explorer and conquistador	463.81	221,701	478 sq mi (1,238 km^{2})	A state map highlighting Hernando County in the middle part of the state. It is medium in size.
Highlands County	055	Sebring	April 23, 1921	DeSoto	Named for the county's hilly terrain	108.10	111,122	1,028 sq mi (2,663 km^{2})	A state map highlighting Highlands County in the southern part of the state. It is large in size.
Hillsborough County	057	Tampa	January 25, 1834	Alachua	Wills Hill, Earl of Hillsborough (1718–1793), former Secretary of State for the Colonies	1497.73	1,574,115	1,051 sq mi (2,722 km^{2})	A state map highlighting Hillsborough County in the middle part of the state. It is large in size.
Holmes County	059	Bonifay	January 8, 1848	Jackson and Walton	Holmes Creek, which forms the eastern boundary of the county	41.74	20,119	482 sq mi (1,248 km^{2})	A state map highlighting Holmes County in the northwestern part of the state. It is small in size.
Indian River County	061	Vero Beach	June 29, 1825	St. Lucie	The Indian River Lagoon, which flows through the county	343.54	172,799	503 sq mi (1,303 km^{2})	A state map highlighting Indian River County in the eastern part of the state. It is small in size.
Jackson County	063	Marianna	August 12, 1822	Escambia	Andrew Jackson (1767–1845), the seventh President of the United States	54.18	49,629	916 sq mi (2,372 km^{2})	A state map highlighting Jackson County in the northwestern part of the state. It is medium in size.
Jefferson County	065	Monticello	January 20, 1827	Leon	Thomas Jefferson (1743–1826), the third President of the United States and principal author of the Declaration of Independence	26.77	16,007	598 sq mi (1,549 km^{2})	A state map highlighting Jefferson County in the northwestern part of the state. It is medium in size.
Lafayette County	067	Mayo	December 23, 1856	Madison	Gilbert du Motier, marquis de La Fayette (1757–1834), French aristocrat and general in the American Revolutionary War	16.19	8,792	543 sq mi (1,406 km^{2})	A state map highlighting Lafayette County in the corner part of the state. It is medium in size.
Lake County	069	Tavares	July 26, 1887	Orange and Sumter	Named for the many lakes in the region	478.56	456,068	953 sq mi (2,468 km^{2})	A state map highlighting Lake County in the middle part of the state. It is large in size and narrow in shape.
Lee County	071	Fort Myers	May 13, 1887	Monroe	Robert E. Lee (1807–1870), commander of the Confederate Army of Northern Virginia in the American Civil War	1089.06	875,607	804 sq mi (2,082 km^{2})	A state map highlighting Lee County in the southern part of the state. It is medium in size.
Leon County	073	Tallahassee	December 29, 1824	Gadsden	Juan Ponce de León (1474–1521), Spanish explorer who named Florida	448.35	299,048	667 sq mi (1,728 km^{2})	A state map highlighting Leon County in the northwestern part of the state. It is medium in size.
Levy County	075	Bronson	March 10, 1845	Alachua	David Levy Yulee (1810–1886), one of the state's original United States Senators	43.40	48,520	1,118 sq mi (2,896 km^{2})	A state map highlighting Levy County in the corner part of the state. It is large in size.
Liberty County	077	Bristol	December 15, 1855	Gadsden	The patriotic ideal of liberty	9.61	8,035	836 sq mi (2,165 km^{2})	A state map highlighting Liberty County in the northwestern part of the state. It is large in size.
Madison County	079	Madison	December 26, 1827	Jefferson	James Madison (1751–1836), fourth President of the United States	27.11	18,759	692 sq mi (1,792 km^{2})	A state map highlighting Madison County in the corner part of the state. It is medium in size.
Manatee County	081	Bradenton	January 9, 1855	Hillsborough	The manatee, or sea cow, is native to Florida waters.	631.85	468,200	741 sq mi (1,919 km^{2})	A state map highlighting Manatee County in the middle part of the state. It is medium in size.
Marion County	083	Ocala	March 14, 1844	Alachua, Hillsborough, and Mosquito	Francis Marion (c. 1732–1795), military officer during the American Revolution	280.34	442,660	1,579 sq mi (4,090 km^{2})	A state map highlighting Marion County in the corner part of the state. It is large in size.
Martin County	085	Stuart	August 4, 1925	Palm Beach	John W. Martin (1884–1958), governor of Florida at time of creation of the county	299.05	166,272	556 sq mi (1,440 km^{2})	A state map highlighting Martin County in the southern part of the state. It is small in size and shaped like a rectangle.
Miami-Dade County	086	Miami	February 4, 1836	Monroe named Dade until 1997	City of Miami and Francis L. Dade (c. 1793–1835), Major in the United States Army during the Second Seminole War	1439.89	2,802,029	1,946 sq mi (5,040 km^{2})	A state map highlighting Miami-Dade County in the southernmost part of the state. It is large in size.
Monroe County	087	Key West	July 3, 1823	St. Johns	James Monroe (1758–1831), fifth President of the United States	80.65	80,406	997 sq mi (2,582 km^{2})	A state map highlighting Monroe County in the southernmost part of the state. It is medium in size.
Nassau County	089	Fernandina Beach	December 29, 1824	Duval	Duchy of Nassau in Germany	163.92	106,879	652 sq mi (1,689 km^{2})	A state map highlighting Nassau County in the corner part of the state. It is medium in size.
Okaloosa County	091	Crestview	September 7, 1915	Santa Rosa and Walton	A Choctaw word meaning "a pleasant place", "black water", or "beautiful place"	236.98	221,810	936 sq mi (2,424 km^{2})	A state map highlighting Okaloosa County in the northwestern part of the state. It is medium in size and shaped like a narrow rectangle.
Okeechobee County	093	Okeechobee	August 7, 1917	Osceola and St. Lucie	Lake Okeechobee, which was in turn is from the Hitchiti words for "big water"	55.05	42,608	774 sq mi (2,005 km^{2})	A state map highlighting Okeechobee County in the southern part of the state. It is medium in size.
Orange County	095	Orlando	December 29, 1824	St. Johns named Mosquito until 1845	The fruit that was the county's main product	1682.82	1,528,002	908 sq mi (2,352 km^{2})	A state map highlighting Orange County in the middle part of the state. It is medium in size.
Osceola County	097	Kissimmee	July 11, 1887	Brevard and Orange	Osceola (1804–1838), a leader of the Seminole during the Second Seminole War	364.39	481,718	1,322 sq mi (3,424 km^{2})	A state map highlighting Osceola County in the middle part of the state. It is large in size.
Palm Beach County	099	West Palm Beach	July 1, 1909	Miami Dade County	The county's large amounts of palm trees	774.69	1,575,726	2,034 sq mi (5,268 km^{2})	A state map highlighting Palm Beach County in the southern part of the state. It is large in size.
Pasco County	101	Dade City	June 2, 1887	Hernando	Samuel Pasco (1834–1917), United States Senator at the time of creation of the county	905.39	674,516	745 sq mi (1,930 km^{2})	A state map highlighting Pasco County in the middle part of the state. It is medium in size.
Pinellas County	103	Clearwater	November 14, 1911	Hillsborough	From the Spanish Punta Piñal, or "Point of Pines"	3387.73	948,563	280 sq mi (725 km^{2})	A state map highlighting Pinellas County in the middle part of the state. It is small in size.
Polk County	105	Bartow	February 8, 1861	Brevard and Hillsborough	James K. Polk (1795–1849), the 11th President of the United States	466.55	874,790	1,875 sq mi (4,856 km^{2})	A state map highlighting Polk County in the middle part of the state. It is large in size.
Putnam County	107	Palatka	January 13, 1849	Alachua and St. Johns	Benjamin A. Putnam (1801–1869), soldier during the Second Seminole War and Floridian legislator	107.66	77,734	722 sq mi (1,870 km^{2})	A state map highlighting Putnam County in the corner part of the state. It is medium in size.
St. Johns County	109	St. Augustine	July 21, 1821	One of the two original counties	Name derived from the St. Johns River, which in turn derives its name from San Juan del Puerto	568.68	346,328	609 sq mi (1,577 km^{2})	A state map highlighting St. Johns County in the corner part of the state. It is medium in size.
St. Lucie County	111	Fort Pierce	July 1, 1905	Brevard	Saint Lucy (283–304), the Christian martyr	703.58	402,449	572 sq mi (1,481 km^{2})	A state map highlighting St. Lucie County in the southern part of the state. It is small in size.
Santa Rosa County	113	Milton	February 18, 1842	Escambia	Santa Rosa Island, which is in turn named for Saint Rosa de Viterbo (1235–1252), a saint born in Viterbo, Italy	207.79	211,115	1,016 sq mi (2,631 km^{2})	A state map highlighting Santa Rosa County in the northwestern part of the state. It is large in size.
Sarasota County	115	Sarasota	June 15, 1921	Manatee	Native American word, of uncertain meaning, for the area	839.09	479,958	572 sq mi (1,481 km^{2})	A state map highlighting Sarasota County in the southern part of the state. It is medium in size.
Seminole County	117	Sanford	April 25, 1913	Orange	The Seminole Native American tribe	1597.03	491,884	308 sq mi (798 km^{2})	A state map highlighting Seminole County in the middle part of the state. It is small in size.
Sumter County	119	Bushnell	January 8, 1853	Marion	Thomas Sumter (1734–1832), general in the American Revolution	288.96	157,772	546 sq mi (1,414 km^{2})	A state map highlighting Sumter County in the middle part of the state. It is medium in size and narrow in shape.
Suwannee County	121	Live Oak	February 28, 1859	Columbia	The Suwannee River, a 266-mile long river in northern Florida	69.98	48,149	688 sq mi (1,782 km^{2})	A state map highlighting Suwannee County in the corner part of the state. It is medium in size.
Taylor County	123	Perry	December 23, 1856	Madison	Zachary Taylor (1784–1850), 12th President of the United States	20.36	21,210	1,042 sq mi (2,699 km^{2})	A state map highlighting Taylor County in the corner part of the state. It is medium in size.
Union County	125	Lake Butler	October 1, 1921	Bradford	Named for the area's residents united desire to split into a separate county	67.71	16,250	240 sq mi (622 km^{2})	A state map highlighting Union County in the corner part of the state. It is small in size.
Volusia County	127	DeLand	December 29, 1854	Orange	The port of Volusia, whose etymology is uncertain; possibly derived from the Native American word for "Land of the Euchees", the term for the area's native inhabitants	548.44	606,573	1,106 sq mi (2,865 km^{2})	A state map highlighting Volusia County in the middle part of the state. It is large in size.
Wakulla County	129	Crawfordville	March 11, 1843	Leon	The Wakulla River, itself named for a Spanish corruption of a Timucuan word used to describe the body of water, but that is of uncertain meaning	62.75	38,089	607 sq mi (1,572 km^{2})	A state map highlighting Wakulla County in the northwestern part of the state. It is medium in size.
Walton County	131	DeFuniak Springs	December 29, 1824	Escambia and Jackson	George Walton, first Secretary of Florida Territory	88.17	93,288	1,058 sq mi (2,740 km^{2})	A state map highlighting Walton County in the northwestern part of the state. It is medium in size and narrow in shape.
Washington County	133	Chipley	December 9, 1825	Jackson and Walton	George Washington (1732–1799), first President of the United States	46.03	26,695	580 sq mi (1,502 km^{2})	A state map highlighting Washington County in the northwestern part of the state. It is medium in size.

== Racial / Ethnic Profile of counties in Florida (2020 Census) ==
Racial / Ethnic Profile of counties in Florida (2020 Census)
Following is a table of counties in Florida by race/ethnicity. The majority racial/ethnic group is coded per the key below.

Majority minority with no dominant group
Majority White
Majority Black
Majority Hispanic
Majority Asian

Racial and ethnic composition of counties in Florida (2020 Census) (NH = Non-Hispanic) Note: the US Census treats Hispanic/Latino as an ethnic category. This table excludes Latinos from the racial categories and assigns them to a separate category. Hispanics/Latinos may be of any race.
County	Location of County	Total Population	White alone (NH)	%	Black or African American alone (NH)	%	Native American or Alaska Native alone (NH)	%	Asian alone (NH)	%	Pacific Islander alone (NH)	%	Other race alone (NH)	%	Mixed race or Multiracial (NH)	%	Hispanic or Latino (any race)	%
Alachua		278,468	160,463	57.62%	51,171	18.38%	562	0.20%	17,891	6.42%	101	0.04%	1,668	0.60%	12,998	4.67%	33,614	12.07%
Baker		28,259	22,185	78.51%	3,825	13.54%	109	0.39%	157	0.56%	14	0.05%	84	0.30%	912	3.23%	973	3.44%
Bay		175,216	128,348	73.25%	17,549	10.02%	795	0.45%	4,068	2.32%	194	0.11%	720	0.41%	9,696	5.53%	13,846	7.90%
Bradford		28,303	20,320	71.79%	5,427	19.17%	58	0.20%	135	0.48%	12	0.04%	97	0.34%	904	3.19%	1,350	4.77%
Brevard		606,612	430,936	71.04%	56,498	9.31%	1,569	0.26%	15,587	2.57%	482	0.08%	3,389	0.56%	30,244	4.99%	67,907	11.19%
Broward		1,944,375	644,230	33.13%	517,618	26.62%	2,917	0.15%	74,040	3.81%	696	0.04%	21,389	1.10%	74,782	3.85%	608,703	31.31%
Calhoun		13,648	10,490	76.86%	1,668	12.22%	93	0.68%	46	0.34%	0	0.00%	10	0.07%	719	5.27%	622	4.56%
Charlotte		186,847	153,700	82.26%	8,870	4.75%	385	0.21%	2,566	1.37%	63	0.03%	782	0.42%	6,402	3.43%	14,079	7.54%
Citrus		153,843	131,477	85.46%	3,891	2.53%	466	0.30%	2,412	1.57%	43	0.03%	517	0.34%	5,796	3.77%	9,241	6.01%
Clay		218,245	148,986	68.27%	25,621	11.74%	680	0.31%	6,626	3.04%	363	0.17%	1,064	0.49%	11,771	5.39%	23,134	10.60%
Collier		375,752	235,455	62.66%	22,554	6.00%	551	0.15%	5,419	1.44%	61	0.02%	1,502	0.40%	7,961	2.12%	102,249	27.21%
Columbia		69,698	49,096	70.44%	11,441	16.41%	236	0.34%	867	1.24%	27	0.04%	295	0.42%	2,673	3.83%	5,063	7.26%
DeSoto		33,976	18,624	54.81%	4,203	12.37%	80	0.24%	189	0.56%	8	0.02%	80	0.24%	781	2.30%	10,011	29.46%
Dixie		16,759	13,750	82.05%	1,551	9.25%	61	0.36%	58	0.35%	0	0.00%	33	0.20%	618	3.69%	688	4.10%
Duval		995,567	492,039	49.42%	286,344	28.76%	2,306	0.23%	48,652	4.89%	960	0.10%	6,837	0.69%	45,740	4.59%	112,689	11.32%
Escambia		321,905	200,962	62.43%	68,148	21.17%	1,998	0.62%	9,866	3.06%	410	0.13%	1,771	0.55%	17,957	5.58%	20,793	6.46%
Flagler		115,378	84,291	73.06%	10,537	9.13%	291	0.25%	2,450	2.12%	59	0.05%	704	0.61%	4,747	4.11%	12,299	10.66%
Franklin		12,451	9,798	78.69%	1,403	11.27%	41	0.33%	30	0.24%	2	0.02%	41	0.33%	461	3.70%	675	5.42%
Gadsden		43,826	14,093	32.16%	23,326	53.22%	71	0.16%	147	0.34%	4	0.01%	120	0.27%	972	2.22%	5,093	11.62%
Gilchrist		17,864	14,827	83.00%	788	4.41%	62	0.35%	56	0.31%	2	0.01%	45	0.25%	736	4.12%	1,348	7.55%
Glades		12,126	7,132	58.82%	1,434	11.83%	193	1.59%	34	0.28%	0	0.00%	45	0.37%	238	1.96%	3,050	25.15%
Gulf		14,192	11,222	79.07%	1,692	11.92%	66	0.47%	57	0.40%	0	0.00%	34	0.24%	566	3.99%	555	3.91%
Hamilton		14,004	7,633	54.51%	4,422	31.58%	43	0.31%	43	0.31%	0	0.00%	26	0.19%	382	2.73%	1,455	10.39%
Hardee		25,327	11,873	46.88%	2,111	8.34%	55	0.22%	165	0.65%	3	0.01%	35	0.14%	481	1.90%	10,604	41.87%
Hendry		39,619	12,089	30.51%	4,195	10.59%	155	0.39%	339	0.86%	4	0.01%	120	0.30%	605	1.53%	22,112	55.81%
Hernando		194,515	144,060	74.06%	9,507	4.89%	553	0.28%	2,566	1.32%	86	0.04%	868	0.45%	7,830	4.03%	29,045	14.93%
Highlands		101,235	65,511	64.71%	9,484	9.37%	291	0.29%	1,602	1.58%	49	0.05%	307	0.30%	3,048	3.01%	20,943	20.69%
Hillsborough		1,459,762	667,791	45.75%	224,479	15.38%	2,817	0.19%	69,928	4.79%	914	0.06%	9,655	0.66%	56,797	3.89%	427,381	29.28%
Holmes		19,653	16,766	85.31%	1,211	6.16%	120	0.61%	81	0.41%	13	0.07%	27	0.14%	747	3.80%	688	3.50%
Indian River		159,788	117,422	73.49%	13,079	8.18%	273	0.17%	2,341	1.46%	52	0.03%	730	0.46%	5,059	3.17%	20,832	13.04%
Jackson		47,319	30,629	64.73%	12,042	25.45%	196	0.41%	292	0.62%	18	0.04%	144	0.30%	1,783	3.77%	2,215	4.68%
Jefferson		14,510	8,720	60.10%	4,600	31.70%	36	0.25%	34	0.23%	3	0.02%	54	0.37%	405	2.79%	658	4.54%
Lafayette		8,226	6,074	73.84%	1,024	12.45%	16	0.19%	10	0.12%	1	0.01%	18	0.22%	145	1.76%	938	11.40%
Lake		383,956	253,214	65.95%	37,883	9.87%	1,016	0.26%	8,362	2.18%	317	0.08%	2,916	0.76%	14,873	3.87%	65,375	17.03%
Lee		760,822	490,476	64.47%	55,958	7.35%	1,228	0.16%	12,789	1.68%	244	0.03%	3,974	0.52%	22,992	3.02%	173,161	22.76%
Leon		292,198	157,458	53.89%	87,503	29.95%	631	0.22%	10,465	3.58%	155	0.05%	1,261	0.43%	11,811	4.04%	22,914	7.84%
Levy		42,915	32,874	76.60%	3,597	8.38%	122	0.28%	292	0.68%	11	0.03%	170	0.40%	1,769	4.12%	4,080	9.51%
Liberty		7,974	5,729	71.85%	1,353	16.97%	52	0.65%	18	0.23%	1	0.01%	26	0.33%	233	2.92%	562	7.05%
Madison		17,968	10,132	56.39%	6,281	34.96%	53	0.29%	45	0.25%	0	0.00%	63	0.35%	513	2.85%	881	4.90%
Manatee		399,710	273,101	68.32%	31,147	7.79%	779	0.19%	8,433	2.11%	246	0.06%	1,583	0.40%	13,442	3.36%	70,979	17.76%
Marion		375,908	253,837	67.53%	42,795	11.38%	986	0.26%	5,973	1.59%	148	0.04%	1,747	0.46%	14,512	3.86%	55,910	14.87%
Martin		158,431	119,216	75.25%	7,277	4.59%	218	0.14%	2,246	1.42%	42	0.03%	525	0.33%	4,720	2.98%	24,187	15.27%
Miami-Dade		2,701,767	361,517	13.38%	378,756	14.02%	1,589	0.06%	41,672	1.54%	385	0.01%	14,667	0.54%	46,243	1.71%	1,856,938	68.73%
Monroe		82,874	54,731	66.04%	4,517	5.45%	169	0.20%	1,137	1.37%	61	0.07%	407	0.49%	2,420	2.92%	19,432	23.45%
Nassau		90,352	75,817	83.91%	4,945	5.47%	222	0.25%	863	0.96%	52	0.06%	293	0.32%	3,711	4.11%	4,449	4.92%
Okaloosa		211,668	146,271	69.10%	18,896	8.93%	799	0.38%	6,578	3.11%	448	0.21%	1,206	0.57%	14,892	7.04%	22,578	10.67%
Okeechobee		39,644	24,671	62.23%	3,318	8.37%	263	0.66%	332	0.84%	14	0.04%	146	0.37%	1,043	2.63%	9,857	24.86%
Orange		1,429,908	531,362	37.16%	263,624	18.44%	2,207	0.15%	76,870	5.38%	1,114	0.08%	16,015	1.12%	65,691	4.59%	473,025	33.08%
Osceola		388,656	113,362	29.17%	35,145	9.04%	562	0.14%	11,370	2.93%	240	0.06%	4,218	1.09%	12,670	3.26%	211,089	54.31%
Palm Beach		1,492,191	779,759	52.26%	255,724	17.14%	1,536	0.10%	43,356	2.91%	494	0.03%	10,766	0.72%	50,623	3.39%	349,933	23.45%
Pasco		561,891	392,375	69.83%	31,601	5.62%	1,388	0.25%	16,408	2.92%	308	0.05%	2,771	0.49%	23,883	4.25%	93,157	16.58%
Pinellas		959,107	684,463	71.36%	91,431	9.53%	1,942	0.20%	33,700	3.51%	797	0.08%	4,835	0.50%	39,500	4.12%	102,439	10.68%
Polk		725,046	392,621	54.15%	100,950	13.92%	1,623	0.22%	13,181	1.82%	300	0.04%	3,684	0.51%	24,992	3.45%	187,695	25.89%
Putnam		73,321	50,541	68.93%	11,274	15.38%	280	0.38%	469	0.64%	37	0.05%	248	0.34%	2,656	3.62%	7,816	10.66%
St. Johns		273,425	214,428	78.42%	12,940	4.73%	544	0.20%	9,764	3.57%	151	0.06%	1,225	0.45%	11,766	4.30%	22,607	8.27%
St. Lucie		329,226	176,533	53.62%	64,597	19.62%	568	0.17%	5,678	1.72%	141	0.04%	2,470	0.75%	12,919	3.92%	66,320	20.14%
Santa Rosa		188,000	147,518	78.47%	10,690	5.69%	1,112	0.59%	3,818	2.03%	362	0.19%	847	0.45%	11,763	6.26%	11,890	6.32%
Sarasota		434,006	349,700	80.57%	16,165	3.72%	695	0.16%	8,407	1.94%	168	0.04%	1,902	0.44%	13,733	3.16%	43,236	9.96%
Seminole		470,856	264,072	56.08%	50,276	10.68%	765	0.16%	25,164	5.34%	243	0.05%	2,975	0.63%	20,822	4.42%	106,539	22.63%
Sumter		129,752	109,213	84.17%	8,313	6.41%	311	0.24%	1,238	0.95%	31	0.02%	320	0.25%	2,743	2.11%	7,583	5.84%
Suwannee		43,474	31,664	72.83%	4,920	11.32%	167	0.38%	270	0.62%	16	0.04%	143	0.33%	1,509	3.47%	4,785	11.01%
Taylor		21,796	15,629	71.71%	4,196	19.25%	102	0.47%	224	0.03%	0	0.00%	45	0.21%	734	3.37%	866	3.97%
Union		16,147	11,585	71.75%	3,197	19.80%	42	0.26%	35	0.22%	0	0.00%	62	0.38%	462	2.86%	764	4.73%
Volusia		553,543	379,527	68.56%	55,338	10.00%	1,262	0.23%	10,478	1.89%	266	0.05%	2,692	0.49%	21,328	3.85%	82,652	14.93%
Wakulla		33,764	25,987	76.97%	4,202	12.45%	154	0.46%	198	0.59%	19	0.06%	126	0.37%	1,501	4.45%	1,577	4.67%
Walton		75,305	60,644	80.53%	3,294	4.37%	415	0.55%	907	1.20%	38	0.05%	307	0.41%	3,513	4.67%	6,187	8.22%
Washington		25,318	19,484	76.96%	3,236	12.78%	222	0.88%	132	0.52%	28	0.11%	87	0.34%	1,205	4.76%	924	3.65%

== Former counties ==
Fayette County was created in 1832 from the portion of Jackson County east of the Chipola River, with its county seat at Ochesee (now in Calhoun County east of Altha). In 1834, it was merged back into Jackson County.

== Renamed counties ==
Five counties in Florida have been renamed. Most renamings occurred between 1845 and 1861, during the first sixteen years of Florida's statehood. One occurred in 1997, when Dade County changed its name to Miami-Dade County.

County	Dates	Etymology	Fate
Benton County	1844–1850	Thomas Benton (1782–1858), U.S. Senator from Missouri who supported the Armed Occupation Act of 1842 that many Floridians wanted in order to evict Native Americans	Original name of county was Hernando County, and the name was changed back to that in 1850
Dade County	1836–1997	Francis L. Dade (c. 1793–1835), Major in the United States Army during the Second Seminole War	Changed to Miami-Dade County in 1997, in order to benefit from the City of Miami's internationally recognizable name
Mosquito County	1824–1845	Taken from the name the Spanish had given the entire coast, "Los Mosquitos"	Mosquito had already repeatedly ceded land to other counties by 1845, when it was renamed Orange County
New River County	1858–1861	The New River	Renamed to Bradford County in 1861
St. Lucie County	1844–1855	Saint Lucy (283–304), the Christian martyr	Renamed Brevard County in 1855

== Proposed counties ==
County	Proposal date	Etymology	Notes
Leigh Read County	1842	Leigh Read (1809–1841), Florida legislator	Proposed renaming of Mosquito County
Ward County	1870	George Taliaferro Ward (1810–1862), Colonel in the Confederate Army during the American Civil War and Floridian legislator	Proposal to split Hillsborough County roughly along modern Hillsborough-Pinellas boundaries
Gulf County	1887	Gulf of Mexico	Proposal to split Hillsborough County roughly along modern Hillsborough-Pinellas boundaries
Kirby County	1897	Edmund Kirby Smith (1824-1893), General in the Confederate Army who oversaw the Trans-Mississippi Department	Proposal to combine parts of Calhoun County, Holmes County, Jackson County, and Washington County.
Plant County	1911	Henry B. Plant (1819–1899), businessman, industrialist, and railroad magnate	Proposal to split Hillsborough County east of Valrico, with its county seat at Plant City
Sumatra County	1913	Sumatra tobacco in the area	Proposal to split Gadsden County along Attapulgus Creek (a tributary of the Little and Ochlockonee rivers), with its county seat at Havana
Santa Fe County	1915	Santa Fe River	Proposal to combine parts of Putnam County, Alachua County, Clay County, and Bradford County, with its county seat at Melrose
Bloxham County	1915	William D. Bloxham (1835–1911), 13th and 17th governor of Florida	Proposal to combine parts of Levy County and Marion County, with its county seat at Williston
Wilson County	1917	Woodrow Wilson (1856–1924), 28th president of the United States	Proposal to combine parts of Pinellas County north of Dunedin and the western half of Pasco County, with its county seat at Tarpon Springs
Prosperity County	1919	The idea of prosperity	Proposal to combine parts of Lee County, DeSoto County, and Palm Beach County, with its county seat at Moore Haven
Plant County	1921	Henry B. Plant (1819–1899), businessman, industrialist, and railroad magnate	Proposal to split Hillsborough County east of Valrico, with its county seat at Plant City
Henry County	1921	Henry B. Plant (1819–1899), businessman, industrialist, and railroad magnate	Proposal to split Lee County, with its county seat at Ritter
Miami County	1947	City of Miami	Consolidated city-county
Ocean County	1981	Atlantic Ocean	Proposal for barrier island beach communities from Cape Canaveral to Sebastian Inlet to secede from Brevard County
Ocean County	1993	Atlantic Ocean	Proposal for the Jacksonville Beaches communities to secede from Duval County
Springs County	2020	City of High Springs	Proposal to split Alachua County along 34th Street in Gainesville

== See also ==
- List of municipalities in Florida
- List of former municipalities in Florida
- List of places in Florida
- List of county seats in Florida
- List of census-designated places in Florida
