= List of county seats in Florida =

There are 67 counties in the state of Florida. It became a territory of the U.S. in 1821 with two counties complementing the provincial divisions retained as a Spanish territory: Escambia to the west and St. Johns to the east, divided by the Suwannee River. All of the other counties were apportioned from these two original counties. Florida became the 27th U.S. state in 1845, and its last county was created in 1925 with the formation of Gilchrist County from a segment of Alachua County. Each county has a county seat. In Florida, county seats typically have a courthouse at a town square. Of the current 67 counties and one historic county, 31 counties have changed their county seat at least once.

== History ==
When counties were established some counties already had towns, which were soon named county seats. Several counties upon establishment lacked population centers and did not have a county seat for a year or more. Typically during those periods without a definite county seat, county courts and other local government business was held at the residences of community leaders or at churches.

A common cause for a county seat changing is the center of population changing after a new county is created. Railroads bypassing the current county seat is another common cause for a county changing its seat. A hurricane devastating the county seat has led to three counties to change their county seats. The hurricane that made landfall in September 1843 in the Big Bend area devastated Port Leon the county seat of Wakulla County, Florida and St. Joseph the county seat of Calhoun County, Florida. The destruction left in Everglades City by Hurricane Donna in 1960 led to Collier County changing its county seat in 1962. Gulf County is the county to change its seat most recently. In 1965, it changed its county seat from Wewahitchka to Port St. Joe.

Two county seats have lost their status as a county seat and later regained it:

- Newnansville was the county seat of Alachua County from 1828 to 1832. In 1832, it became the county seat of Columbia County. In 1839, it became once again the county seat of Alachua County.
- Miami was the county seat of Dade County from 1844 to 1866, and then regained its status as county seat in 1899.

Five county seats have later become the county seats of other counties:

- Newnansville was the county seat of Alachua County from 1828 to 1832. In 1832, it became the county seat of Columbia County.
- Susannah at Fort Pierce was the county seat of St. Lucie County (renamed Brevard County in 1855) from 1844 to 1864. When a new county named St. Lucie County was established in 1905, Fort Pierce was named the county seat.
- Lake Butler was the county seat of Bradford County, Florida from 1860 until a referendum changed the county seat to Starke, Florida on August 17, 1887. Lake Butler later became the county seat of Union County, Florida when it was established in 1921.
- Pine Level was the county seat of Manatee County from 1866 to 1887. When DeSoto County was created in 1887, it was named the county seat of the newly created county. It remained the county seat of DeSoto County until 1889.
- Enterprise was the county seat of Orange County from 1843 to 1846. It later became the county seat of Volusia upon its creation in 1854, until it was replaced in 1888.

== County seat listing ==
List of County Seats of Florida
County	County Seat	Date	Notes	Coordinates
Alachua; Created 1824	Wanton's	1824		29.506389°N 82.281944°W
Alachua; Created 1824	Newnansville	1828	Transferred to Columbia County in 1832.	29.808611°N 82.476667°W
Alachua; Created 1824	Unknown	1830s		
Alachua; Created 1824	Newnansville	1839	Changed by an act of the state legislature on February 10, 1839, back to Alachua County	29.808611°N 82.476667°W
Alachua; Created 1824	Gainesville	1853	The Florida Railroad bypassed Newnansville and Gainesville was established along the route of the rail line.	29.651997°N 82.324992°W
Baker; Created 1861	Sanderson	1861		30.252222°N 82.272778°W
Baker; Created 1861	Macclenny	1877	Originally called Darbyville. County seat moved from Sanderson after a courthouse fire in 1877.	30.283333°N 82.116667°W
Bay; Created 1913	Panama City	1913	Established in 1888 as Park Resort on St. Andrews Bay (Florida).	30.174444°N 85.664444°W
Bradford; Created 1858	Lake Butler	1860		30.021667°N 82.340833°W
Bradford; Created 1858	Starke	1887	Changed by referendum on August 17, 1887.	29.947222°N 82.108056°W
Brevard; Created 1844	Susannah	1844	Community located outside Fort Pierce.	27.438889°N 80.335556°W
Brevard; Created 1844	Bassville	1864		
Brevard; Created 1844	Eau Gallie	1874		28.129167°N 80.63°W
Brevard; Created 1844	Lake View	1875		
Brevard; Created 1844	Titusville	1879	Changed by referendum in 1879.	28.591111°N 80.82°W
Broward; Created 1915	Fort Lauderdale	1915	Began to grow as a community once the Florida East Coast Railway reached the area in the 1890s.	30.174444°N 80.137397°W
Calhoun; Created 1838	St. Joseph	1838	Established 1835 on St. Joseph Bay and soon became the most populous town in the territory of Florida; Suffered a yellow fever outbreak in 1841. Remains of the abandoned town destroyed by the storm surge of a hurricane that stuck the Gulf Coast in September 1843.	
Calhoun; Created 1838	Abe Springs	1850s		30.365833°N 85.1475°W
Calhoun; Created 1838	Blountstown	1880	Established on the Apalachicola River as a river port prior to the American Civil War; Changed by referendum on April 1, 1880.	30.443056°N 85.045278°W
Charlotte; Created 1921	Punta Gorda	1921	Began to grow as a community as the terminus of the Florida Southern Railway on Charlotte Harbor when the line reached the area in the 1886.	26.915833°N 82.047778°W
Citrus; Created 1887	Mannfield	1887		
Citrus; Created 1887	Inverness	1891	Established as a sawmill town by the late 1860s.	28.839167°N 82.340278°W
Clay; Created 1858	Middleburg	1858		30.050833°N 81.901944°W
Clay; Created 1858	Whitesville	1859	Changed by referendum on October 3, 1859. Whitesvilles was renamed Webster.	
Clay; Created 1858	Green Cove Springs	1872		29.992778°N 81.683889°W
Collier; Created 1923	Everglades	1923	Began to grow as a community as the terminus of the Florida Southern Railway on Charlotte Harbor when the line reached the area in the 1886. Everglades suffered damage during Hurricane Donna in 1960.	25.858889°N 81.384722°W
Collier; Created 1923	East Naples	1962		26.138056°N 81.766667°W
Columbia; Created 1832	Newnansville	1832	Previously the county seat of Alachua County from 1828 to 1832. Transferred to Alachua County by the state legislature on February 10, 1839.	29.808611°N 82.476667°W
Columbia; Created 1832	Alligator	1839	Alligator was renamed Lake City in 1859.	30.183333°N 82.633333°W
DeSoto; Created 1887	Pine Level	1887	Formerly the county seat of Manatee County	27.265132°N 81.991960°W
DeSoto; Created 1887	Arcadia	1889		27.215819°N 81.858266°W
Dixie; Created 1921	Cross City	1921		29.635278°N 83.124722°W
Duval; Created 1822	Jacksonville	1822		30.336944°N 81.661389°W
Escambia; Created 1821	Pensacola	1821	Capital of West Florida from 1763 to 1821.	30.421591°N 87.216478°W
Fayette County; Created 1832; Merged with Jackson 1834	Ochesee	1832		
Flagler; Created 1917	Bunnell	1917		29.4675°N 81.256944°W
Franklin; Created 1832	Apalachicola	1832		29.725278°N 84.9925°W
Gadsden; Created 1823	Quincy	1823		30.583333°N 84.583333°W
Gilchrist; Created 1925	Trenton	1925		29.613405°N 82.818209°W
Glades; Created 1921	Moore Haven	1921		26.833425°N 81.091816°W
Gulf; Created 1925	Wewahitchka	1925		30.114167°N 85.198611°W
Gulf; Created 1925	Port St. Joe	1965		29.814722°N 85.297222°W
Hamilton; Created 1827	Micco Town	1827	Previously a Seminole town.	
Hamilton; Created 1827	Jasper	1835		30.518889°N 82.951111°W
Hardee; Created 1921	Wauchula	1921		27.546111°N 81.814444°W
Hendry; Created 1923	LaBelle	1923		26.760556°N 81.439167°W
Hernando; Created 1843	De Soto	1843	Previously a fort during the Seminole Wars.	
Hernando; Created 1843	Bayport	1860	Bombed during the American Civil War by the United States Navy	28.548333°N 82.645278°W
Hernando; Created 1843	Brooksville	1863	Established in 1856; Became county seat in response to the bombing of Bayport	28.553611°N 82.388611°W
Highlands; Created 1921	Sebring	1921		27.495620°N 81.441001°W
Hillsborough; Created 1834	Tampa	1834		27.968056°N 82.476389°W
Holmes; Created 1848	Cerrogordo	1848		30.831944°N 85.8875°W
Holmes; Created 1848	Pittman's Ferry	18??		
Holmes; Created 1848	Westville	187?		28.553611°N 82.388611°W
Holmes; Created 1848	Bonifay	1904		30.783333°N 85.683333°W
Indian River; Created 1925	Vero Beach	1925		27.638648°N 80.397264°W
Jackson; Created 1822	Webbville	1822		
Jackson; Created 1822	Marianna	1828		30.776389°N 85.238056°W
Jefferson; Created 1827	Monticello	1828		30.545131°N 83.870254°W
Lafayette; Created 1853	New Troy	1858		
Lafayette; Created 1853	Mayo	1892	County seat changed after the courthouse at New Troy was destroyed by fire.	30.051944°N 83.175556°W
Lake; Created 1887	Bloomfield	1887		
Lake; Created 1887	Tavares	1888		28.801667°N 81.733611°W
Lee; Created 1887	Fort Myers	1887		26.616667°N 81.833333°W
Leon; Created 1824	Tallahassee	1824	Capital of Florida from its founding, replacing former capitals St. Augustine (East Florida) and Pensacola (West Florida).	30.438147°N 84.280561°W
Levy; Created 1845	Sodom	1852	Renamed Mount Pleasant in 1854. Renamed Levyville in 1856.	
Levy; Created 1845	Bronson	1869		29.448889°N 82.636389°W
Liberty; Created 1855	Riddleysville	185?		
Liberty; Created 1855	Bristol	18??		30.426944°N 84.979167°W
Madison; Created 1827	San Pedro	1835		
Madison; Created 1827	Madison	1836		30.466667°N 83.416667°W
Manatee; Created 1855	Manatee	1855		
Manatee; Created 1855	Pine Level	1866	Later the county seat of DeSoto County	27.265229°N 81.991835°W
Manatee; Created 1855	Bradenton	1887		27.483333°N 82.583333°W
Marion; Created 1844	Ocala	1846	The community grew up around Fort King.	29.187778°N 82.130556°W
Martin; Created 1925	Stuart	1925		27.192222°N 80.243056°W
Miami-Dade; Created 1836	Indian Key	1836		24.883333°N 80.683333°W
Miami-Dade; Created 1836	Miami	1844		25.775278°N 80.208889°W
Miami-Dade; Created 1836	Juno	1866		
Miami-Dade; Created 1836	Miami	1899		25.775278°N 80.208889°W
Monroe; Created 1823	Key West	1823		24.559167°N 81.784031°W
Nassau; Created 1824	Fernandina Beach	1824		30.669444°N 81.461667°W
Okaloosa; Created 1915	Milligan	1915	Damaged when the Yellow River flooded in 1917.	
Okaloosa; Created 1915	Crestview	1917		30.754167°N 86.572778°W
Okeechobee; Created 1917	Okeechobee	1917		27.243889°N 80.821389°W
Orange; Created 1824	John Bunch's	1824	County seat of then Mosquito County	
Orange; Created 1824	New Smyrna	1835		
Orange; Created 1824	Enterprise	1843	Northern half of Mosquito County renamed Orange County in 1845. Southern half established as St. Lucie County in 1844.	28.869167°N 81.266667°W
Orange; Created 1824	Mellonville	1846		
Orange; Created 1824	Orlando	1856		28.538434°N 81.379108°W
Osceola; Created 1887	Kissimmee	1887		28.303889°N 81.412778°W
Palm Beach; Created 1909	West Palm Beach	1909	Established along the route of the Florida East Coast Railway in 1894.	26.709722°N 80.064167°W
Pasco Beach; Created 1887	Dade City	1887		28.361389°N 82.193333°W
Pinellas; Created 1912	Clearwater	1912	Clearwater's status as county seat was legally contentious for a number of years after the establishment of Pinellas County.	27.973611°N 82.764167°W
Polk; Created 1861	Jefferson	1862		
Polk; Created 1861	Bartow	1867		27.8925°N 81.839722°W
Putnam; Created 1849	Palatka	1849		29.647778°N 81.651389°W
St. Johns; Created 1821	St. Augustine	1821	Capital of Spanish Florida from 1565 to 1763. Capital of East Florida from 1763 to 1821. Capital of Florida Territory from 1822 to 1824.	29.894722°N 81.314444°W
St. Lucie; Created 1905	Fort Pierce	1905	Former county seat of Brevard County from 1844 to 1864.	27.438889°N 80.335556°W
Santa Rosa; Created 1842	Milton	1842		30.630278°N 87.046389°W
Sarasota; Created 1921	Sarasota	1921		27.337222°N 82.535278°W
Seminole; Created 1913	Sanford	1913		28.789444°N 81.275556°W
Sumter; Created 1853	Adamsville	1853		28.799722°N 82.020556°W
Sumter; Created 1853	Leesburg	185?		28.810556°N 81.883333°W
Sumter; Created 1853	Sumterville	1881	Changed by referendum on October 15, 1881. Courthouse destroyed by fire on January 30, 1909.	28.7475°N 82.063889°W
Sumter; Created 1853	Bushnell	1912	Changed by referendum in 1912 after political fighting arose after the courthouse fire at Sumterville.	28.663889°N 82.114167°W
Suwannee; Created 1858	Houston	1858		30.256944°N 82.9025°W
Suwannee; Created 1858	Live Oak	186?	Located at the junction of the Florida spur of the Atlantic and Gulf Railroad and the Florida, Atlantic and Gulf Central Railroad.	30.294444°N 82.985833°W
Taylor; Created 1856	Perry	1856		30.114444°N 83.5825°W
Union; Created 1921	Lake Butler	1921	Formerly the county seat of Bradford County from 1860 until 1887.	30.022602°N 82.339643°W
Volusia; Created 1854	Enterprise	1856	Formerly the county seat of Orange County from 1843 to 1846.	28.869167°N 81.266667°W
Volusia; Created 1854	Deland	1888	Courthouse rebuilt in 2001.	29.028889°N 81.300556°W
Wakulla; Created 1843	Port Leon	1843	Declared county seat on March 11, 1843; Devastated by a hurricane on September 13, 1843.	30.131111°N 84.195°W
Wakulla; Created 1843	Newport	1843	Residents of Port Leon moved to Newport following the devastation of the hurricane.	30.199421°N 84.180700°W
Wakulla; Created 1843	Crawfordville	1865/6		30.176111°N 84.375278°W
Walton; Created 1824	Alaqua	182?		
Walton; Created 1824	Eucheanna	184?	Courthouse destroyed by fire in 1885.	
Walton; Created 1824	DeFuniak Springs	1886	Changed by referendum on February 16, 1886.	30.716667°N 86.116667°W
Washington; Created 1825	Vernon	1825		30.621667°N 85.711667°W
Washington; Created 1825	Chipley	1927		30.779167°N 85.539167°W

== See also ==
List of counties in Florida
