= Dunlawton Plantation and Sugar Mill =

- Dunlawton Plantation-Sugar Mill Ruins
- U.S. National Register of Historic Places
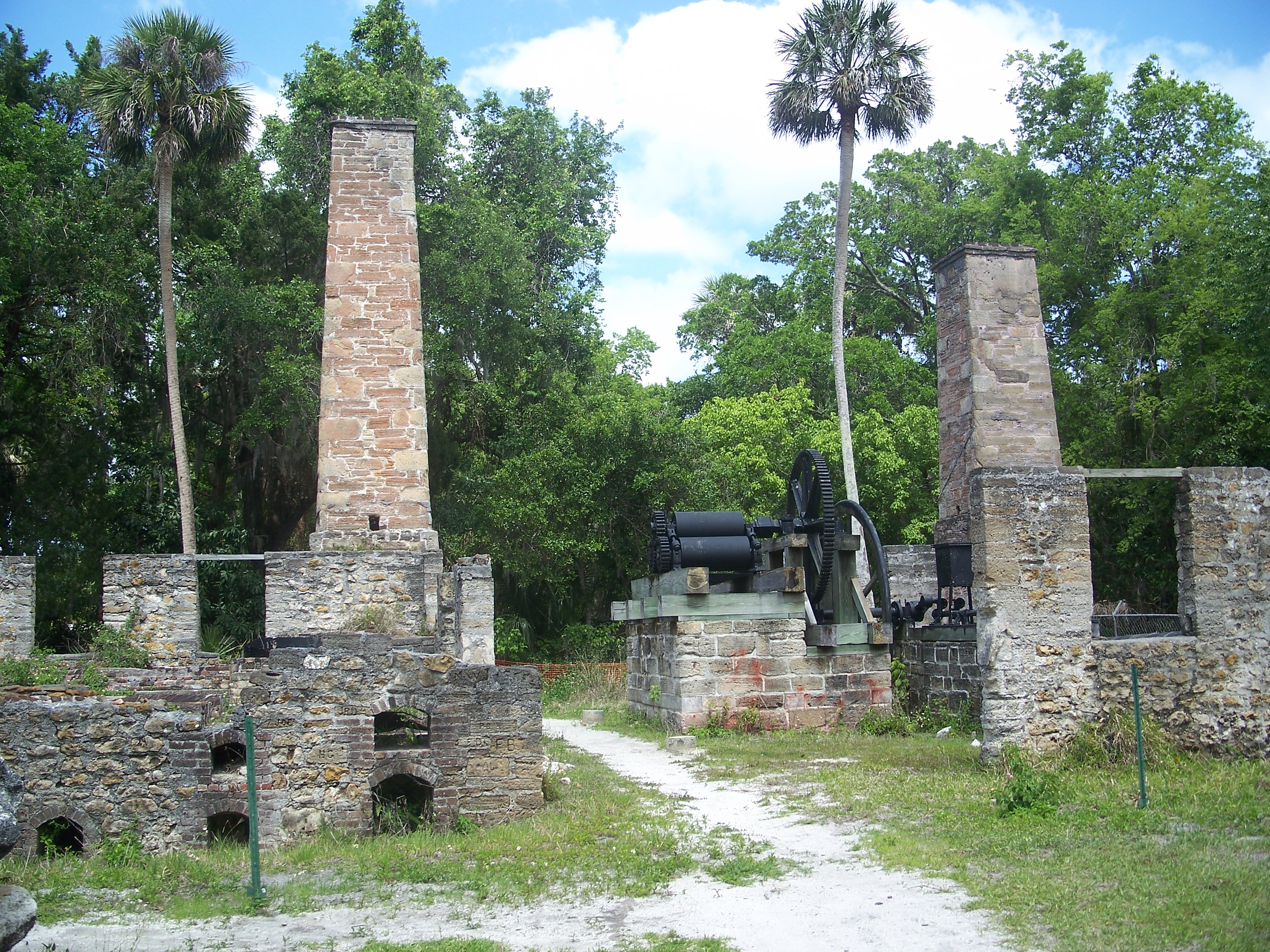

- Location within Volusia County
- Location: Port Orange, Florida
- Coordinates: 29°8′27″N 81°0′22″W
- NRHP reference No.: 73000606
- Added to NRHP: August 28, 1973

The Dunlawton Plantation and Sugar Mill, a 19th-century cane sugar plantation in north-central Florida, was destroyed by the Seminoles at the beginning of the Second Seminole War. The ruins are located at 950 Old Sugar Mill Road, Port Orange, Florida. On August 28, 1973, the site was added to the United States National Register of Historic Places under the title of Dunlawton Plantation-Sugar Mill Ruins.

The ruins are now part of the Dunlawton Sugar Mill Gardens. The botanical gardens include interpretive signs about the enclosed ruins, large concrete sculptures of dinosaurs and a giant ground sloth, a gazebo, and plantings of grasses, flowers, bushes and native plants under a canopy of oak trees.

== History ==
=== Early years ===
The Dunlawton Plantation and its sugar mill date to the latter years of the Second Spanish period in Florida. In August 1804, Patrick Dean, a merchant from the Bahamas, and his uncle John Bunch, a planter from Nassau, were granted by the Spanish Crown land in Florida that had been part of the British Turnbull grant of 1777. Dean established a 995-acre indigo and sugarcane plantation in what is now the Port Orange area, using the labor of enslaved Africans to cultivate and process the crops. Dean apparently was killed by a renegade Indian or slave during the First Seminole War in 1818, and left the plantation to his aunt Cecily, the wife of his uncle John Bunch, who had set up his own plantation on the grant to the north of Dean's property. Cecily died soon after Dean, and the plantation passed to John Bunch, who operated the two properties until 1830 as a single plantation.

John B. Bunch McHardy, an officer in the British Navy and grandson of John and Cecily Bunch, eventually inherited the former Dean property. He had no interest in running a plantation, and sold the land to land dealers Charles and Joseph Lawton for $3,000. In 1832, the brokers sold it to Sarah Anderson and her two sons, George and James, for $4,500 (~$159,453 in 2025). The name Dunlawton was formed by combining her maiden name, Dunn, with the land dealers' name, Lawton. The brothers operated the mill with slave labor—processing sugar, molasses and rum on the property until December 1835, when the Second Seminole Indian War began.

=== Second Seminole War ===
By late November, 1835, white settlers in the Territory of Florida were becoming alarmed by the activities of the Seminole Indians, some of whose leaders vehemently protested the official Indian removal policy of the United States, and Osceola's killing of Charley Emathla threatened to provoke an armed confrontation. On December 17, 1835, Gen. Joseph Hernández ordered troops to protect the plantations in the vicinity of the Matanzas, Tomoka, and Mosquito Rivers. Major Benjamin A. Putnam, a St. Augustine lawyer, led a detachment of the local militia, Company A of the St. Augustine Guards, to Dunlawton, where "the Anderson brothers were endeavoring to place the estate in a condition for defense by erecting a stockade. These efforts were terminated by the impressment of the brothers into service with the detachment."

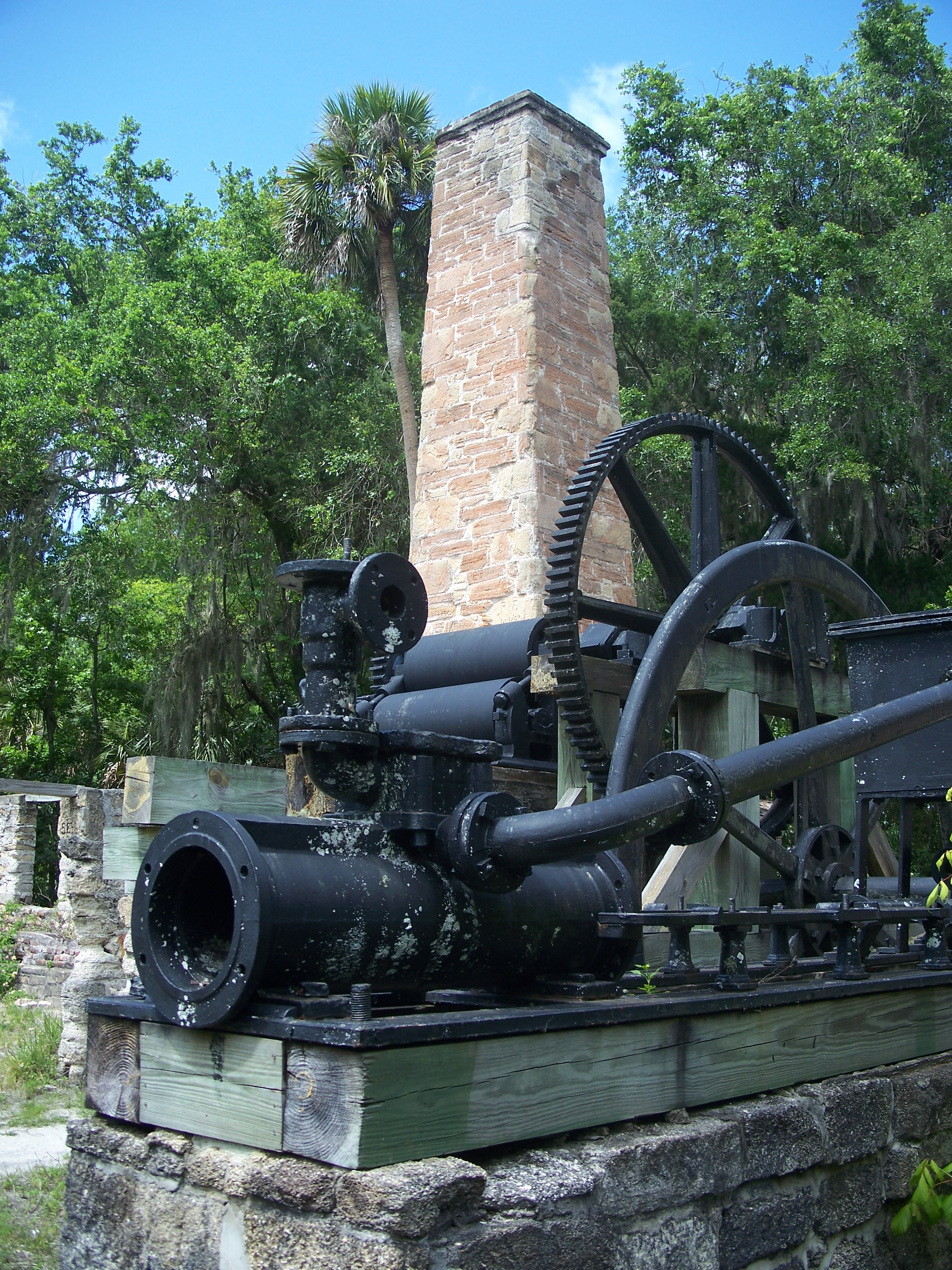
Port Orange Sugar Mill Ruins machinery

On the night of December 24, 1835, the Seminoles began their depredations against the plantations south of St. Augustine,) and during the next several weeks, the marauding Indians burned or ransacked sixteen plantations, including Dunlawton. Many of the refugees who fled from the destroyed plantations gathered at Charles Wilhelm Bulow's estate. Upon his return from the south, Gen. Hernández ordered Capt. Keogh to occupy Bulowville. Maj. Putnam and his company of poorly trained militia, as well as the "Mosquito Roarers", a company from Mosquito Inlet under Capt. Douglas Dummett, were dispatched to Dunlawton plantation to recover abandoned stores. On January 17, 1836, Putnam led the troops down Bulow Creek to the Halifax River and southward to Dunlawton. As they approached, they saw that a large war party of Seminoles still occupied the place. According to M. M. Cohen's journal of the campaign against the Seminoles in 1836, Notices of Florida and the Campaigns, the Andersons' dwelling house and several slave houses were burning when the command arrived. Heavy fire was exchanged in the skirmish, but the militiamen were unable to drive away the Indians. Dunlawton plantation was only partly destroyed by the Seminoles, who burned some of its buildings when they attacked the string of plantations stretching between St. Augustine and New Smyrna. By early February, the Seminoles had succeeded in forcing the white settlers to abandon most of the territory south of St. Augustine.

This event is also viewed as a liberation of the enslaved workers, part of a large scale slave rebellion facilitated by Seminoles. Florida historian Canter Brown claims that “When open warfare commenced in December 1835 and January 1836, hundreds-if not 1,000 or more-bondsmen cooperated by deserting to Indian and black settlements.” Dec. 26, 1835: Second Seminole War

=== Rebuilding of the sugar mill ===
In 1846, Sarah Anderson sold Dunlawton to John J. Marshall, a master builder from Charleston, South Carolina, for $8,000 (~$256,040 in 2025). Marshall rebuilt the mill and expanded it in an effort to make the sugar plantation productive again. He installed processing machinery bought from the destroyed Cruger and DePeyster mill in New Smyrna, and with the labor of 25 slaves produced nearly 200 tons of sugar in 1851. The eventual collapse of the sugar market caused Marshall to quit the enterprise and sell the property. His failure marked the effective demise of Dunlawton Plantation, and its role in the political history of East Florida ended. The property changed hands several times in the following years, being used for various purposes.

=== Civil War and following years ===
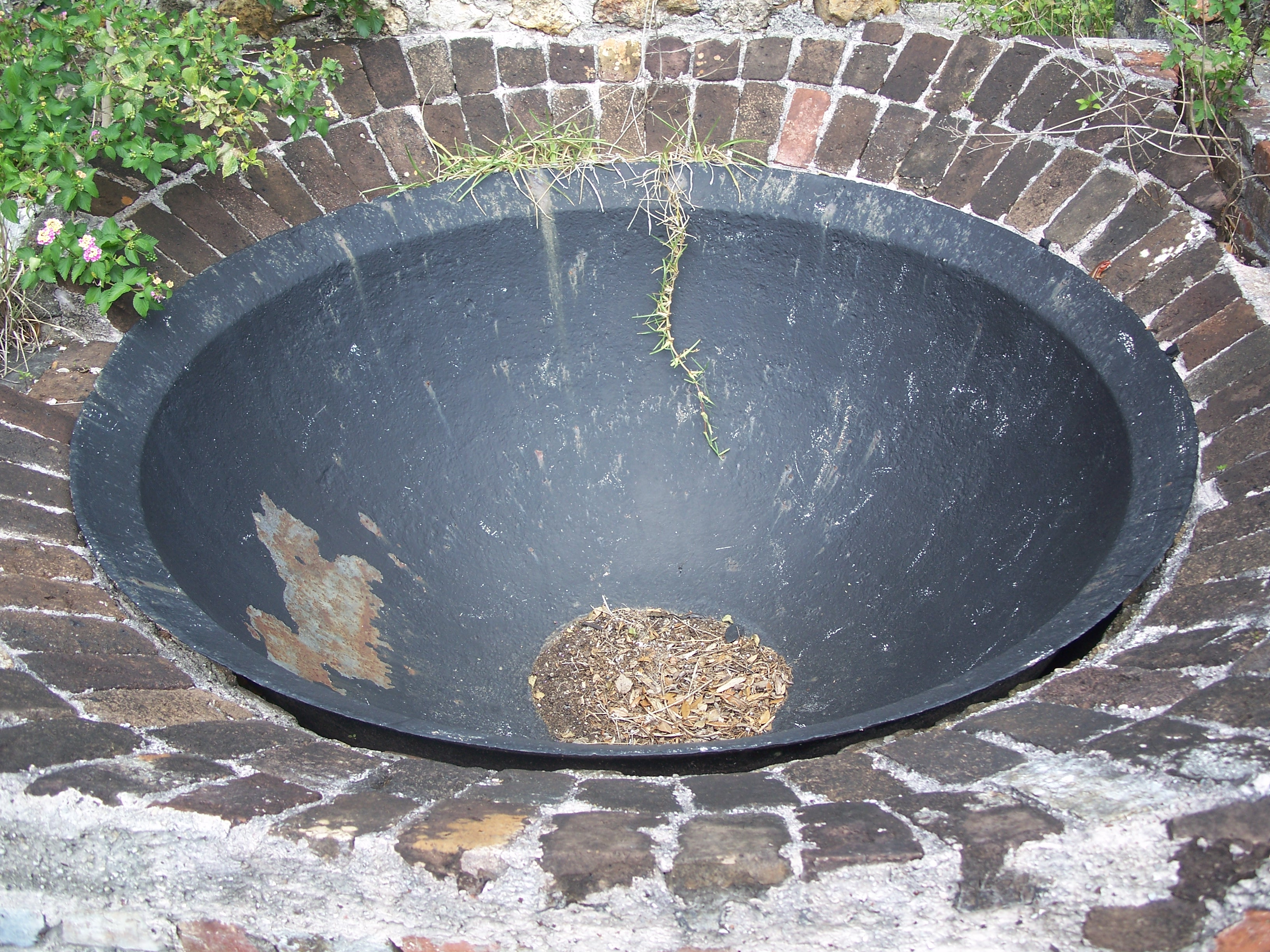
Iron cane juice boiling kettle

During the American Civil War, the kettles for boiling cane juice were used by the Confederates for salt-making. A Confederate reconnaissance patrol called the St. John Rangers made their headquarters at the Dunlawton millhouse, hitching their horses and camping under a large live oak now called the "Confederate Oak".

John Marshall sold the plantation in 1871 to William Dougherty, whose son Charles inherited the property when his father died. A successful lawyer, Charles was elected Florida's first United States Congressman. He showed no interest in agriculture, however, and the mill was never operated again.

The mill sugar boiling kettles were no longer used to process sugar after the Civil War, but when two whales beached themselves below the newly built wooden Port Orange bridge in 1906, their carcasses were dragged to Dunlawton plantation where the furnaces were fired up and the oil from the whales' blubber rendered in the old kettles.

The remains of the sugar mill include the ruins of coquina block and brick structures, and an assortment of sugar processing equipment including the gear mechanisms of the rolling sugar cane press, the iron boiling kettles, and the steam furnace and piston mechanisms used in operating the cane press. This assembly is one of the earliest extant examples in the United States of the machinery required to produce sugar, molasses, and rum.

=== Bongoland ===
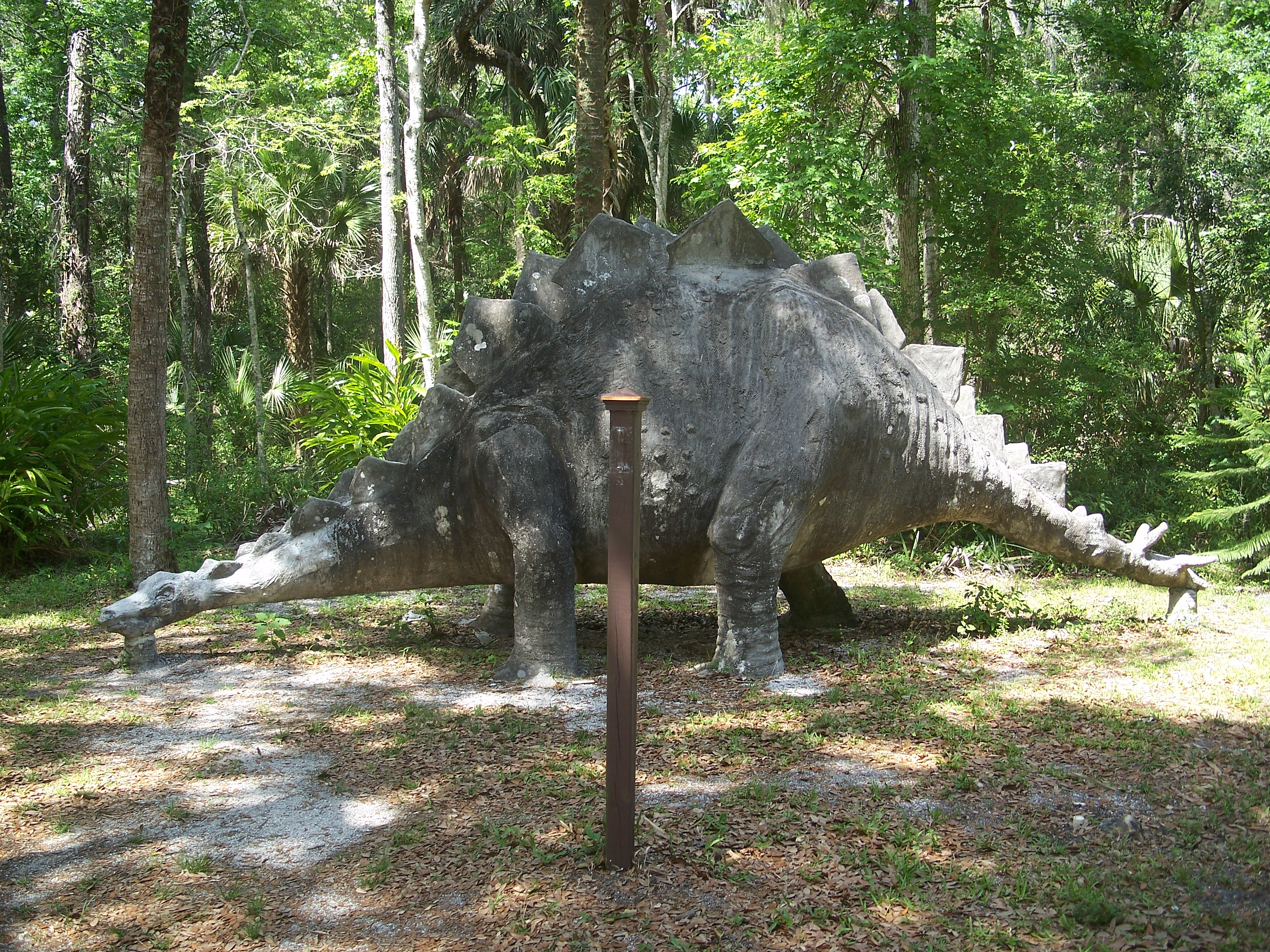
Anatomically inaccurate statue of a stegosaurus at Bongoland

In 1948, Dr. Perry Sperber, a dermatologist practicing in Daytona Beach, leased the Dunlawton plantation property from J. Saxton Lloyd, and opened one of the first theme-parks in Florida, Bongoland, named after Bongo, a trained baboon kept in captivity there. The new attraction was advertised to tourists traveling south on U.S. Highway 1, but it proved to be short-lived, operating only from 1948 to 1952.

A miniature train carried visitors past life-sized statues of so-called "prehistoric monsters"—dinosaurs fashioned by M.D. "Manny" Lawrence out of chicken wire and concrete. Among the five statues still existing are a triceratops, a stegosaurus, a tyrannosaurus rex, a dimetrodon and a giant ground sloth added later. According to a 1991 article in the Orlando Sentinel, a Seminole family lived on the grounds for two years in a chickee, or outdoor shelter with a thatched roof and open sides. In 1963, Lloyd landscaped the site, retaining the dinosaurs, and donated it to the county.

== See also ==
- List of dinosaur parks
