= Mosquito Roarers =

American militia company

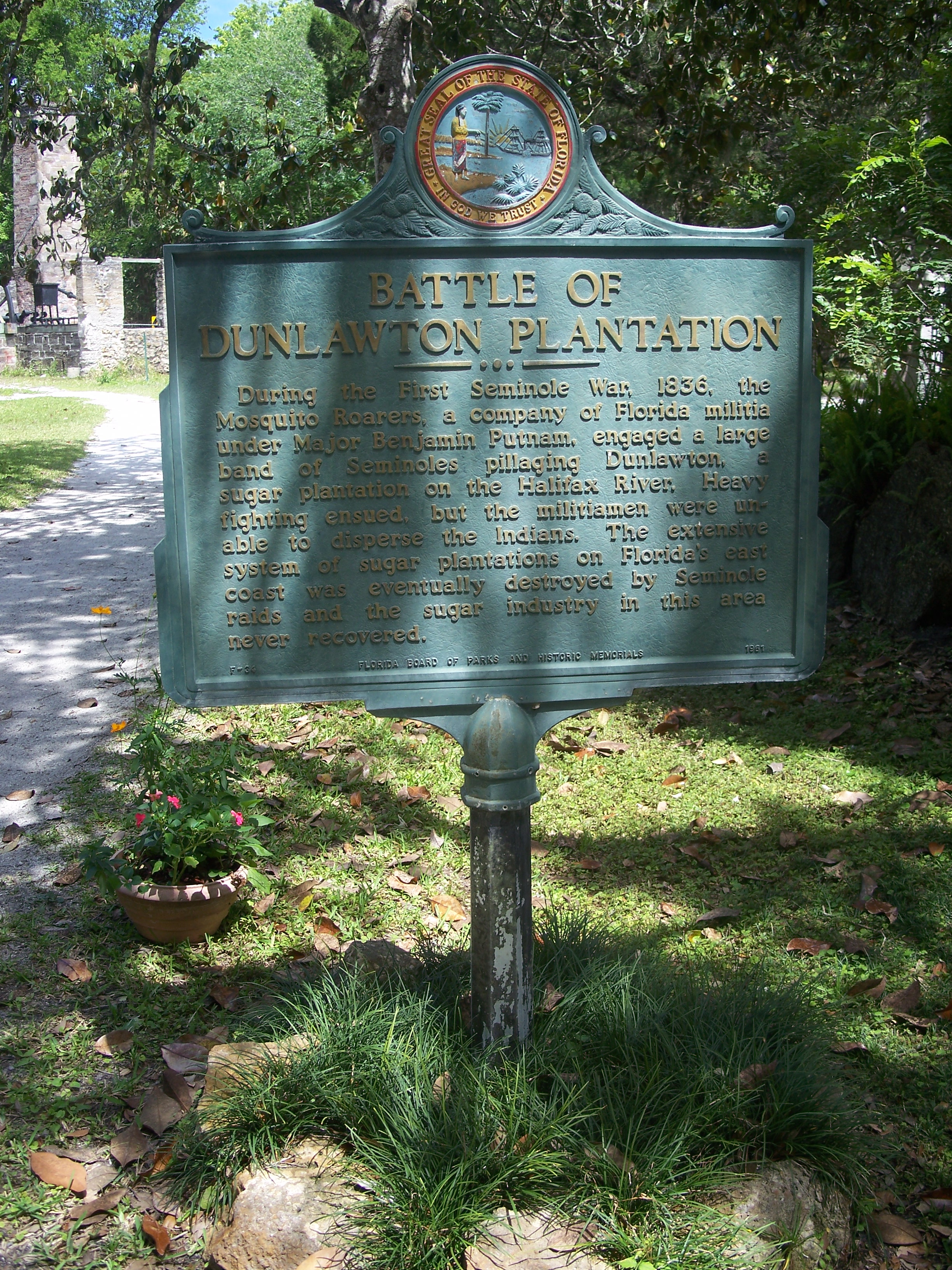
- Dunlawton Plantation historical marker
- Active: 1835-1840s
- Country: Florida Territory
- Allegiance: United States
- Branch: Florida Militia
- Type: Militia
- Size: Company
- Engagements: Second Seminole War: Battle of Ouithlacoochie; Battle of Dunlawton Plantation

Commanders
- Notable commanders: Maj. Benjamin Putnam; Lt. Dummett

The Mosquito Roarers was an American militia company formed in Mosquito County, Florida. Called into service during the Fall of 1835, the militia became Company B of the Florida militia. They were involved in battles against the Seminole people.

== History ==
The regiment's commanding officer was Major Benjamin Putnam and companies were commanded by Lt. Douglas Dummett, the son of a local Halifax River plantation owner, James Ormond II, whose family Ormond Beach, Florida is named for, and Colonel Joseph Sanchez.

On December 21, 1835 the Mosquito Roarers, along with other companies, arrived at an outpost on the Tomoka River named Rosetta (named for the Rosetta Plantation owned by John Moultrie). Seminole Indians began later that month attacking plantations throughout New Smryna, Florida and the rest of Mosquito County.

On New Years eve of 1835, the Mosquito Roarers were present and took part in the Battle of Ouithlacoochie along the Withlacoochee River in present-day Citrus County, one of the first major battles of the Second Seminole War. The Mosquito Roarers aided in providing cover for the US Army as their troops ferried themselves and supplies across the banks.

On January 17, 1836 the Mosquito Roarers were involved in another confrontation with the Seminole Indians on Dunlawton Plantation in present-day Port Orange, Florida. This skirmish was eventually put to an end when Coacoochee arrived with more Seminoles and forced the Mosquito Roarers to retreat.

After the conclusion of the Second Seminole War, the Mosquito Roarers remained relatively active as support for local sheriffs and law enforcement when hunting criminals and stopping disturbances.
