= History of Brevard County, Florida =

The history of Brevard County can be traced to the prehistory of native cultures living in the area from pre-Columbian times to the present age. Brevard County is a county in the U.S. state of Florida, along the coast of the Atlantic Ocean. The geographic boundaries of the county have changed significantly since its founding. The county is named for Judge Theodore W. Brevard, an early settler, and state comptroller, and was originally named St. Lucie County until 1855. The official county seat has been located in Titusville since 1894, although most of the county's administration is performed from Viera.

== History ==
=== Precolumbian ===
The first Paleoindians arrived in the area near Brevard county between 12,000 and 10,000 years ago. The Paleoindians were semi-nomadic people who lived in smaller groups. At that time, the Earth was warming from its most recent ice age. The climate of the area then was very different from now; it was similar to that of Great Britain today. The area which today is Brevard County was probably not coastal at this period in time. The coast of Florida was about 100 miles (160 km) wider and the Indian River was simply a lower point on dry land.

After a few thousand years, perhaps by around 3000 B.C. peninsular Florida resembled the land of today; in shape, climate, fauna, and flora. The ocean had risen enough to flood the Indian River with salt water.

About this time, a new group of settlers appeared known as "the archaic people." These people were primarily fishermen, as opposed to the hunting and gathering way of life which characterized the Paleoindians. It is believed that these were the ancestors of the Native Americans who would come in contact with the Europeans when they arrived.

=== From Spanish rule to statehood ===
The Ais and the Jaega were the dominant tribes in the area when it is thought that Ponce De Leon landed on the shores near Melbourne Beach in 1513. There were about 10,000 of these natives in the area.

According to a local legend, French survivors from Jean Ribault's expedition built a fort in the area with timbers from the wreckage of the flagship of Ribault's fleet, the Trinite, which wrecked on the shores of Cape Canaveral. Pedro Menéndez de Avilés gave an early account of the Ais people in 1570 when he was shipwrecked off of Cape Canaveral. He faced hostile natives but through the use of a bluff was able to escape from them and get back to St. Augustine.

In 1605, Alvero Mexia was dispatched from St. Augustine to the Indian River area on a diplomatic mission to the Ais Indian Nation. He helped establish a "Period of Friendship" with the Ais Caciques(Chiefs) and made a color map of the area.

Heavy mosquito infestation and the threat of Indian attacks kept the area from having any permanent white settlements. The Spanish quickly left the area, but left a deadly reminder of their visit: European diseases. In 1763, the Spanish took the last 80 natives to Cuba. By that time, almost the entire precolumbian population of Florida had died out. Creek Indians from the north quickly swept down from Georgia and the Carolinas to fill the void. These Indians became known as the Seminole. Their activity in Brevard County was intermittent and usually not permanent. Between 1650 and 1720 the area that is today Brevard County was very remote and inaccessible to Europeans. As a result of this the only Europeans in this time period to visit what has since become Brevard County and Indian River County were pirates, the vast and overwhelming majority of whom were British. Spanish ships laden with gold would travel via the gulf stream, and British pirates would hide in the then-remote waters off of the coast of Florida.

Throughout the 18th century, the great European powers Spain, Great Britain and France vied for power in Florida. Their interest in the peninsula was more strategic than for building any real settlements. In contrast to today, where living in Florida means comfort and the "good life" to many people, Florida in the 18th century was seen as a hostile place with dangerous fauna such as venomous snakes, alligators and panthers. Death by malaria was a possibility and death at the hands of angry Indians seemed even more likely. After being under Spanish, French, British, and then Spanish rule again, Florida finally became a United States territory.

In 1837, Fort Ann was established on the eastern shore of the Indian River on a narrow strip of land on Merritt Island. During the construction of the Hernández–Capron Trail, General Joseph Hernandez and his militiamen encamped near present-day Mims. These settlements were short lived and were abandoned shortly thereafter.

=== Statehood to 1900 ===
Boundaries of Brevard County in 1855, when it was renamed from St. Lucie County

In 1845, Florida became the 27th state of the Union.

During the 19th century, the state of Florida was constantly changing the names and borders of counties. St. Lucie County was split off from Mosquito County in 1844. St. Lucie County was renamed Brevard County in 1855 after Theodore Washington Brevard, who served as Florida Comptroller from 1854 to 1860. This "Brevard County" contained very little of present-day Brevard County. Most of present-day Brevard north of Melbourne was part of either Volusia or Orange counties. Brevard County in 1856 extended as far west as Polk County and as far south as coastal Dade County. Complicating the discussion of Brevard County in the 19th century is that the boundaries have shifted such that the southernmost parts of present-day Brevard, were originally the northernmost parts. The original county seat was located at Susannah, an early name for present day Fort Pierce. Later the southern part of Brevard split off to form a new county, St. Lucie County in 1905. Gradually, the borders of Brevard County were shifted northward while the county got "pinched" eastward. The portions of Brevard County in present-day Broward and Palm Beach counties were given to Dade County, western areas of the county were given to Polk and Osceola County, and parts of Volusia and Orange Counties were given to Brevard including the eventual county seat of Titusville. Later, the southern portion of the county was cut off to form St. Lucie County, which in turn spawned Martin and Indian River County.

The first permanent settlement in present-day Brevard was established near Cape Canaveral in 1848. After the establishment of a lighthouse, a few families moved in and a small, but stable settlement was born. Gradually, as the threat of Seminole Indian attacks became increasingly unlikely, European Americans began to move into the area around the Indian River. In the 1850s a small community developed at Sand Point, which eventually became the city of Titusville. Unlike other areas of Florida, the American Civil War had little effect on Brevard County, other than perhaps to slow the movement of settlers to the area.

In 1864, the county seat was moved to Bassvile, an area presently in Osceola County on the southeast shore of Lake Tohopekaliga. In 1874, the county seat was moved to Eau Gallie. Then in 1875 the seat was moved to Lake View.

In 1870, the Barber–Mizell feud erupted due to resentment over Reconstruction, a boundary dispute with Orange County, and cattle taxation.

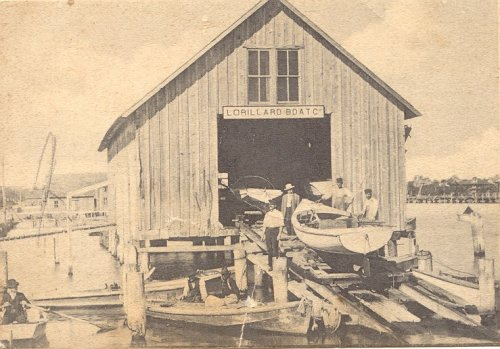
Boathouse, Titusville, Florida 1885.

By the 1880s, the cities along the Indian River included Melbourne, Eau Gallie, Titusville, Rockledge, and Cocoa. Unlike cities further inland in Florida, these cities did not have to rely as heavily on roads. The primary way of transversing the county was by water. In 1877 commercial steamboat transportation became a reality as the steamboat Pioneer was brought to the area.

The first real boom to the area occurred with the extension of Henry Flagler's Florida East Coast Railroad into the area. The railroad reached Titusville in 1886 and Melbourne in 1894. With the railroad came increased settlement and the first tourists.

In 1895, the first library in Brevard County was established in Cocoa as a community effort undertaken by the women of Cocoa. In 1959, after five libraries had been established in Brevard County, Florida Statute 150 was put into effect to provide public funding to these libraries in recognition that they would serve all residents in Brevard County. In the 1960s, the number of libraries in the county increased to 9. Further funding was secured for the Brevard County Library System in 1972 through a public vote establishing a Library Tax District. As the area's population grew, the number of libraries in the county nearly doubled in the following 50 years.

=== 20th century to present ===
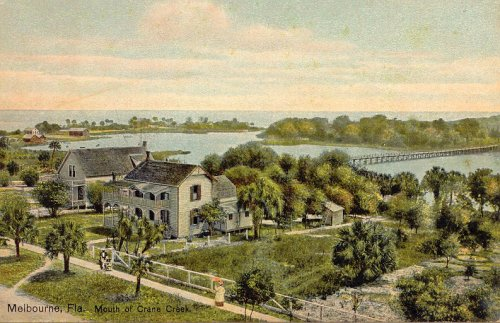
Crane Creek, Melbourne circa 1900

The advent of the automobile age brought accelerated growth to Brevard County as resorts and hotels were developed all around the county. As the automobile became increasingly important as a means of transportation, roads were built connecting Brevard County to the rest of Florida, and ultimately the rest of the nation. Ferries provided the first connections across the rivers, and were replaced by wooden bridges in the early 20th century. They had gates to allow the passage of boats through the waterways.

The first major land boom began in the 1920s after the end of World War I. People flooded into the state of Florida, both tourists from northern winters and new full-time residents, and land prices soared. The Great Depression temporarily stopped growth in Florida. Before the start of World War II, the largest industries in Brevard were commercial fishing, citrus, and tourism.

In 1926, ten white men lynched a black man in Eau Gallie. This was the last person lynched in the county. The perpetrators were never brought to justice.

In 1940, the government built Naval Air Station Banana River (now Patrick Space Force Base). This military installation was the first of major federal investment in projects to aid the development of Brevard County. The federal government also funded construction of what is now Florida State Road A1A, paralleling the ocean and providing vehicle access to the NAS. It funded the replacement of the three wooden bridges connecting the mainland to the barrier island with concrete ones. The wooden bridges had still accommodated both horses and wagons, and automobiles. The Melbourne-Eau Gallie airport was given $5 million in upgrades to become a major regional airport.

In 1941, wartime forced blackouts along the coast. Submarines were using lights from shore to outline targeted ships. Residents found it awkward driving at night without headlights.

As in the rest of the state and most of the South, African Americans in the county were largely disenfranchised and oppressed by Jim Crow conditions, but beginning to organize to restore their constitutional rights. Beginning in the 1930s, Harry T. Moore was a civil rights leader, teacher, and founder of the Brevard County NAACP. After the war he became president of the state NAACP. After the Supreme Court had ruled in 1944 that white primaries were unconstitutional, he conducted voter registration drives and succeeded in registering 31% of black voters in Florida, a higher percentage than in any other southern state. The white establishment resisted, firing both him and his wife Harriette in 1946 from their teaching positions as economic blackmail against them because of their activism. On Christmas night, 1951, a bomb exploded under their home, fatally injuring both of them. The murders were racially motivated and believed committed by members of the Ku Klux Klan. Four separate investigations were conducted, including the first by the FBI in 1951–52, and the last in 2005 by the state. No one was ever prosecuted.

In the late 1950s, the government opened the Long Range Proving Ground. This later became the Kennedy Space Center. This helped stimulate development in the county; where Brevard had once been considered a "backwoods" area of Florida, it attracted more educated workers and scientists associated with the program. What had once been a primarily low-tech farmer/fisherman economy was transformed into a high-tech engineering and computer economy.

New residents in the 1960s found local retailing unappealing and drove to nearby Orlando to shop. Locals were concerned that the construction of malls would draw off business and lead to the disintegration of the Cocoa, Melbourne and Titusville downtowns. This did happen, but the downtown areas have been revived in the 21st century based on their historic assets and pedestrian scale.

While the county was technically habitable, it was overrun by mosquitoes much of the year in the wet areas covering a great portion of its territory. Mosquitoes were controlled in 1950 by widespread use of the insecticide, DDT, which was banned in the late 20th century because of its adverse environmental effects. Reducing mosquitoes resulted in more residents being attracted to the county. When DDT became illegal, more environmentally-friendly insecticides and other mosquito-control methods were used.

Beginning in the 1960s, new bridges constructed across the waterways were designed as high-rise steel, designed to be high enough to allow passage of boats underneath.

In 1982, Windover Archaeological Site was discovered.

As the county was long, people in the southern, more populous side of the county complained about being so distant from the county seat. The county seat of Titusville was 50 miles (80 km) from Palm Bay, the most populous city in the county. Residents in the southern end of the county talked of creating a new county to serve them. The county decided to build a new county administration complex at Viera, near the geographical center of the county. This complex was started in 1989. Residents in the north also threatened secession. Their proposal to form a new county, to be called Playalinda, had some momentum in the early 90s. The county made a few concessions to the people in the northern part of the county, and agreed not to officially move the county seat. Since construction of the new center, Viera has been for all intents and purposes the de facto seat of Brevard County.

During the summer of 1998, some of the worst brush fires on record broke out and could not be controlled. 70,000 acres (280 km^{2}; 110 sq mi) were burned. Prior to property managers instituting controlled burns, the county forests and pastures had burned for months during the dry season.

From the 1940s to the 1970s, the state assumed control of burning in order to prevent uncontrolled fires. It also developed a policy of controlled burns based on more understanding of fire's role in the state's environment. In 2006, the state burned a record 72,065 acres (291.64 km^{2}; 112.602 sq mi) in the county. Because of Florida's dry winters and lush vegetation, the fire threat is always high. Only California surpassed Florida in the number of fires fought by the state Forest Service, and none set so many controlled fires.

=== Job growth ===
In 2004, Brevard County ranked 13th out of 318 largest counties in the US for increase in the number of jobs. The county moved from 70 to 31 out of the top 200 metropolitan areas "Best Performing". This improvement was driven mainly by job growth. The 2004 hurricane recovery helped the area achieve high employment.

In 2004, Brevard had its best October and November tourism season until then, despite widespread hurricane damage and the loss of five beachside hotels. Four of these hotels were restored by 2006.

The Milken Institute ranked Brevard number one, out of 200 largest metropolitan areas, in overall job growth for 2005.

== Effects of hurricanes ==
Hurricane Matthew, which passed east of Brevard in 2016, caused about $38 million in damage.

In 2017, nearly all county residents were left without power as the result of the effect of Hurricane Irma, which struck the county with tropical storm force on September 10–11, 2017. This was largely rectified by September 19. Irma resulted in $157 million in damage. Most residents were left without potable water after the storm passed, when electric power failed to maintain the necessary 20 pounds per square inch (140 kPa) pressure to keep out potential contaminants, plus water main breaks, and stress on the system from the extra water from subsequent heavy rainfall.

== Demographics ==
In 1966, the population was 200,700. There were 73,624 licensed drivers, 16,612 registered Republicans, 49,261 registered Democrats, 1,545 independents. There were 4,291 births, 1,018 deaths, 94,500 in the civilian labor force, and 1,800 unemployed.

In 2016, the population was 561,716. There were 470,993 licensed drivers, 164,663 registered Republicans, 127,430 registered Democrats, 101,721 independents. There were 5,299 births, 6,693 deaths, 255,465 in the civilian labor force, and 12,981 unemployed.

== Economy ==
In 1966, the county produced 2,880,000 boxes of oranges; in 2016, 382,000 boxes.

Orange production dropped 87% from the 2008–09 season to the 2016–17 season. The decline was mostly due to canker, citrus greening disease, and hurricane damage. Unless a cure can be found for greening, the outlook is dim for improved production.

== See also ==
- Timeline of Installs and Open dates
- List of members of the Florida House of Representatives from Brevard County, Florida
