= Benjamin Alexander Putnam =

American politician

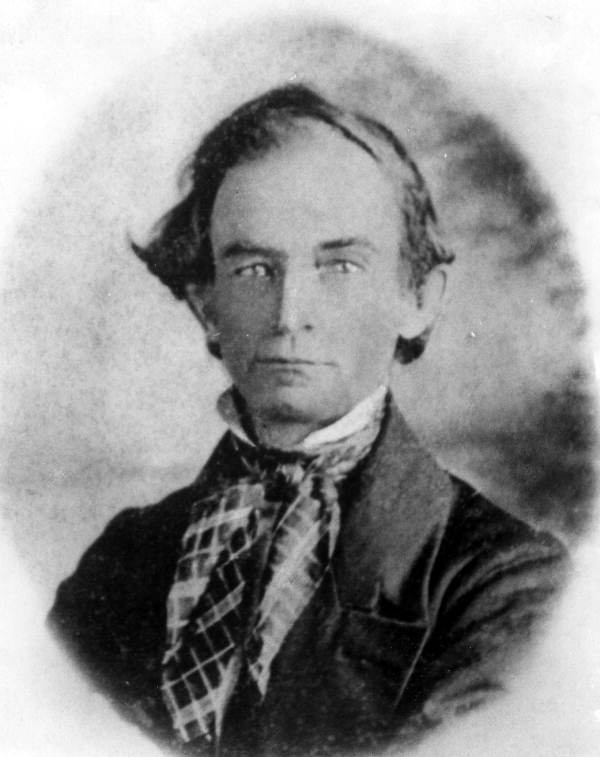
Photograph

Benjamin Alexander Putnam (1801 or 1803 - January 25, 1869) was a lawyer, state legislator, state surveyor, officer in the military during the Seminole Wars, judge, and president of the Florida Historical Society.

He was born in 1800 or 1801 on the Putnam Plantation near Savannah, Georgia. He was the grandson of Israel Putnam. In 1830 he married Helen Kirby, daughter of Ephraim Kirby.

Benjamin attended Harvard and then studied law privately in Saint Augustine, Florida where he established a law practice. He served in the Seminole Wars from 1835 until 1842, leading a company of militia named the Mosquito Roarers and eventually rising in rank from major to adjutant general.

He served in both houses of the Florida legislature including as Speaker of the Florida House of Representatives in 1848. He was appointed Surveyor-General of Florida by U.S. President Zachary Taylor and held that office from May 1848 until 1854. He also served as President of the Florida Historical Society from 1856 until 1859. He died on January 25, 1869, in Palatka, Florida. Putnam County, Florida is named for him.

The University of Florida Libraries have a view of his home from St. George Street. The home was torn down in 1886.

His daughter married into the Calhoun family. Benjamin Putnam Calhoun was his grandson. A collection of Putnam-Calhoun papers is listed on WorldCat.
