= Leigh Read =

American politician and military commander

Leigh Read (1809-1841) was a Democratic Party politician in Florida and general in the Second Seminole War. Born in 1809 in Sumner County, Tennessee, Read migrated to Florida and settled in Centerville, Florida in 1831. Read studied in Richard K. Call's law library before being admitted to the bar in April 1833. He married twice; first to a daughter of John Bellamy, an affluent planter and road builder from Jefferson County. After her death he married Eliza Branch, daughter of former North Carolina governor John Branch.

== Second Seminole War and career ==
During the Second Seminole War, Read signed on with Governor Call's volunteers to fight against the Seminole. Read was wounded at the Battle of Withlacoochee. After recovering, he was elected as commander of a militia battalion that participated in the 1836 campaign. During the spring of that campaign, Read led his unit in a rescue of fifty-eight Jefferson County volunteers who were stranded at an outpost on the Withlacoochee River. Around this time, President Andrew Jackson appointed Read as the brigadier general of the Florida militia.

Read was critical of General Winfield Scott's strategy in the Second Seminole War and said that he was employing "obsolete...European tactics where they could not possibly work".

In 1837 Read ran to become Florida's delegate to Congress but lost to Charles Downing. The following year Read was elected to represent Leon County at the Florida Constitutional Convention of 1838.

== Dueling ==
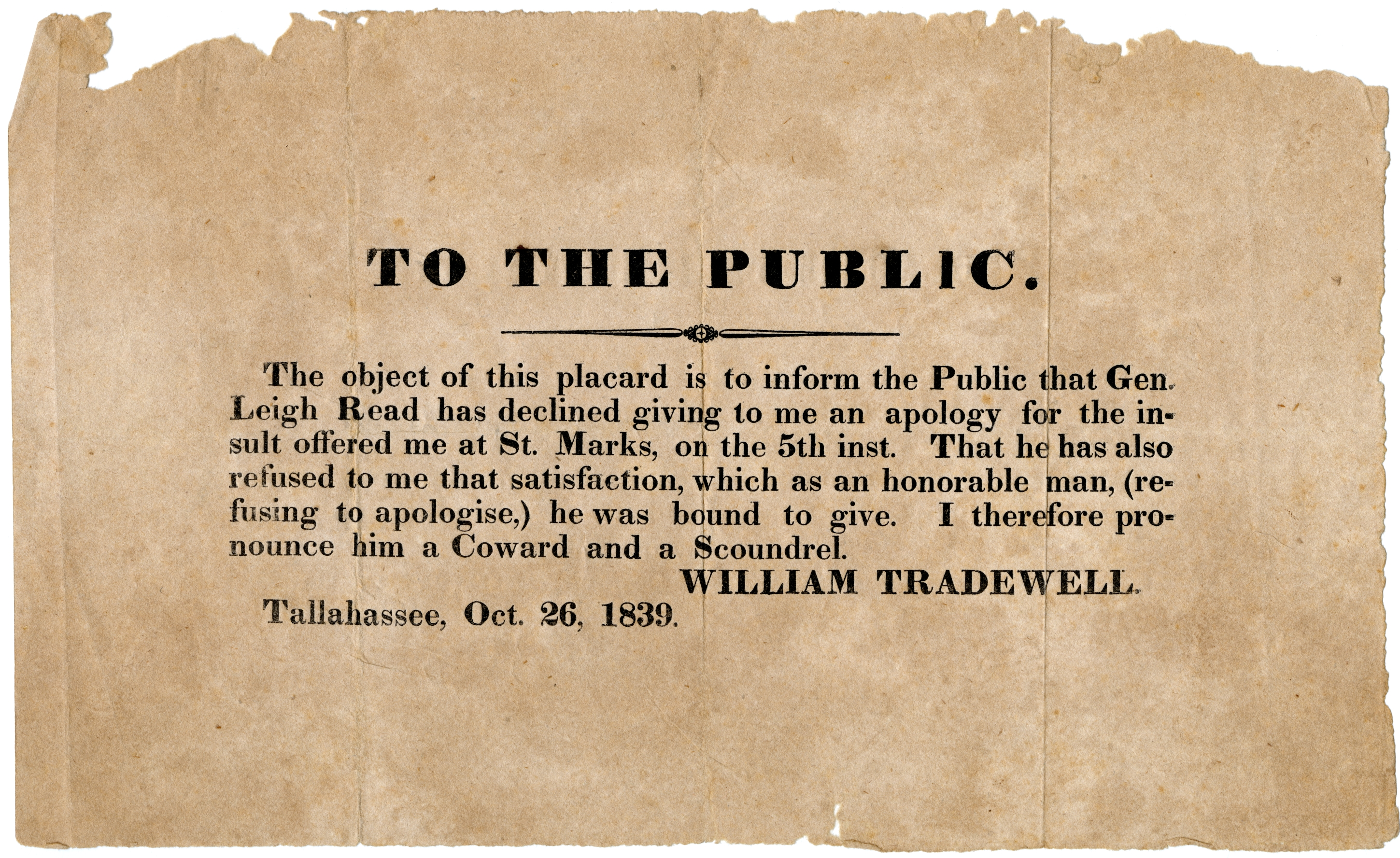
Public Notice of call for duel between Leigh Read and William Tradewell

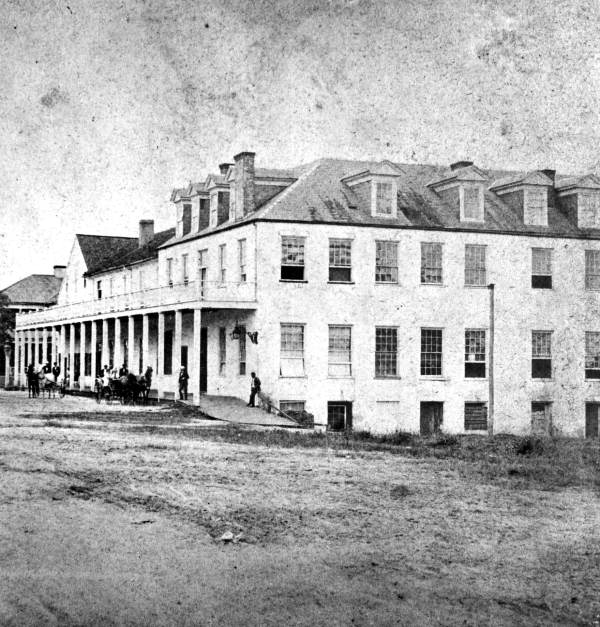
Photograph of the Tallahassee City Hotel, where Read was first attacked by Willis Alston.

While Read was practicing law in Florida in the 1830s, he became involved in a number of duels, both as a primary combatant as well as a second. His propensity for dueling gave him a "reputation as a worthy adversary on the field of honor".

As Read's fame and notoriety as an outspoken Democrat and frequent duelist rose, he increasingly became the target of physical and verbal attacks from members of the opposing Whig Party. During this period, anti-bank Democrats and pro-bank Whigs fought each other, both verbally and physically, over the future of Florida's banking system.

Augustus Alston, a leading Whig politician and director of the Union Bank of Florida, was one of the most outspoken critics of Read. After the two had several verbal exchanges, in late November 1839 Read formally challenged Alston to a duel. Rifles were chosen as the weapon at fifteen paces.

On the morning of December 12, 1839, Read and Alston met at Mannington, near the Florida-Georgia border. The small isolated community had become a popular dueling site since an ongoing border dispute between Florida and Georgia over the land made prosecuting duelists more difficult. After taking their fifteen paces, the men turned and were to shoot on the count of four. Alston slipped and fired before the full count. The bullet missed Read, who then returned fire and hit Alston in the chest, killing him instantly.

In early January, Augustus's brother, Willis Alston, attacked Read at Tallahassee's City Hotel. During the attack, Read was stabbed and shot. Alston was able to escape and avoided capture for the next several weeks. Though severely wounded, Read survived the attack.

While still recovering from his wounds, Read was made commander of 1,500 volunteers who were ordered to protect settlers west of the Suwannee River from the Seminole. On May 22, 1840, he was also appointed United States Marshal for the Middle District of Florida by the Democrat President Martin Van Buren. However, this appointment was short-lived. After the 1840 United States presidential election, the new Whig president, William Henry Harrison, replaced Read.

On April 26, 1841, Willis Alston ambushed and killed Read as he was headed to the court house in Tallahassee.

== Legacy ==
In 1842 the Florida Territorial Council wrote a bill that proposed to change the name of Mosquito County to Leigh Read County to honor Read. Although the bill eventually failed, several maps were published that depict Leigh Read County in existence.
