= Douglas Dummett =

American politician

- Dummett and his wife Leandra

Member of the Legislative Council of the Territory of Florida representing St. Johns County
- In office 1843–1845

Member of the Florida House of Representatives from Mosquito County
- In office 1845–1845 Serving with Algernon S. Speer
- Preceded by: Thomas T. Russell
- Succeeded by: Mosquito County split and renamed

Personal details
- Born: 1806 Barbados
- Died: 1873 (aged 66–67) Florida
- Party: Democratic
- Spouse(s): Frances Hunter (m. 1837, div. 1844), Leandra Fernandez

Douglas Dummett (1806–1873) was an American planter, plantation owner, and politician. He served as a member of the Legislative Council of the Territory of Florida representing St. Johns County in 1843, and a member of the Florida House of Representatives representing Mosquito County in 1845. He was instrumental in developing the Indian River Citrus industry in Florida.

== Early life ==
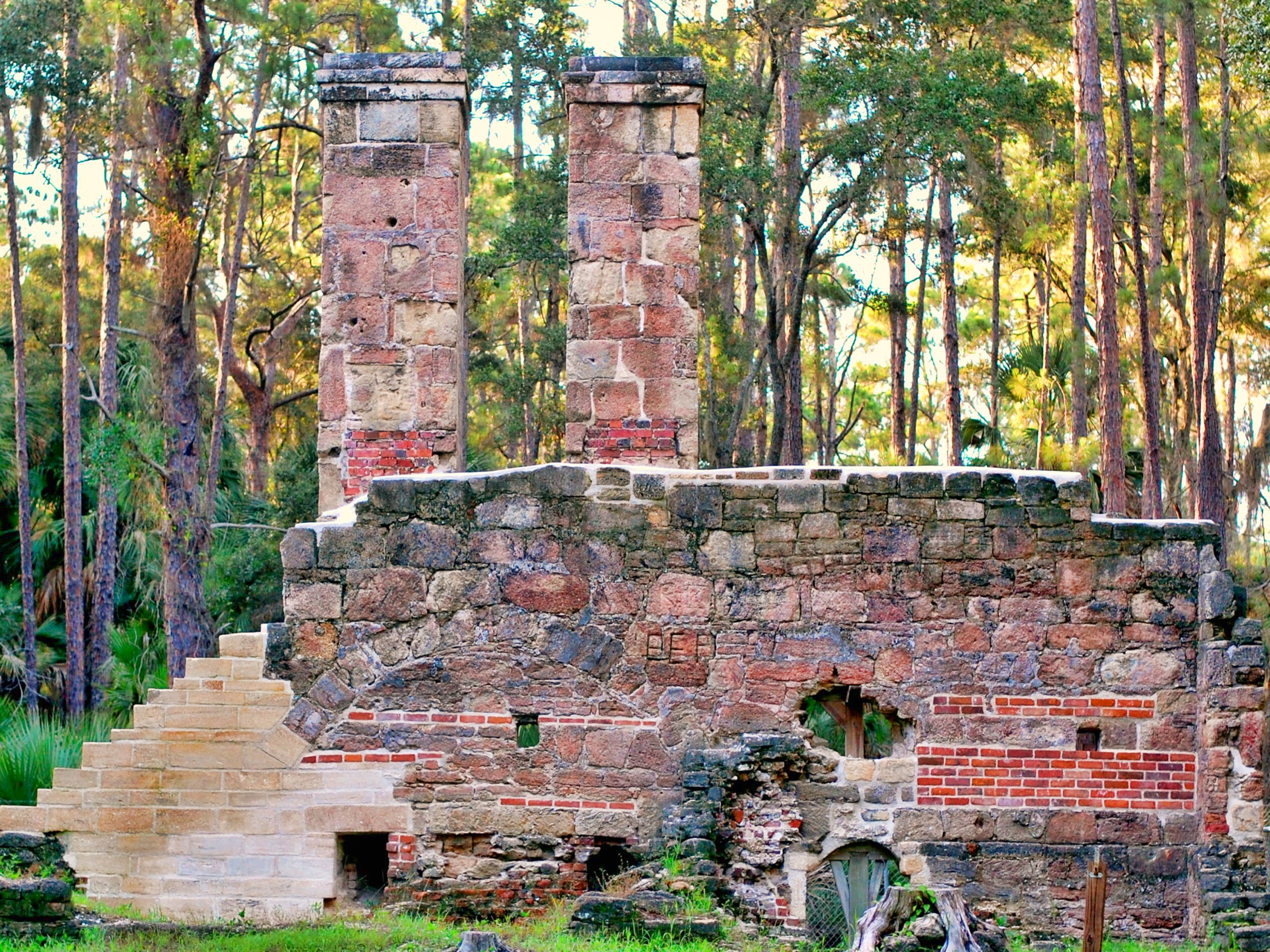
Dummett Sugar Mill Ormond Beach Florida 1825

Douglas Dummett's father, Col. Thomas Henry Dummett (1775–1839), had served in the British Royal Marines and became a planter in Barbados. He and his wife Mary, with their eleven children, left the island in 1817 after a slave uprising and lived in New Haven, Connecticut for several years before moving to Florida in 1821.

Col. Dummett bought John Addison's plantation of 1,404 acres, "Carrickfergus", on the west side of the Tomoka River, a mile west of present-day Tomoka State Park. The purchase included 67 enslaved Africans, horses, and cattle. He sold the Carrickfergus property to Duncan and Kenneth MacRae, then bought John Bunch's plantation of about 2,000 acres, including houses and outbuildings, as well about 90 slaves. Col. Dummett apparently shipped his steam boiler engine from Barbados to use in processing the sugarcane produced at his plantation, and commissioned Reuben Loring to build a sugar mill and rum distillery. During the annual sugar cane grinding season, about 100 slaves and 40 Indians operated the sugar mill, heating and processing the sugar cane juice to produce molasses, which was stored in three cisterns, and passed to the plantation's own rum distillery. The Indians would trade wild game they killed for the sugar works’ products.

According to the memoirs of Douglas's sister, Anna, the family lived in a sizable log house with a palmetto-thatched roof shaded by live oak trees draped with Spanish moss, and a yard of Bermuda grass. The house, probably the former dwelling of John Bunch, had a large fireplace with polished brass andirons, and was elegantly furnished with a sideboard holding heavy silverware, a brass-bound mahogany wine cooler, claw-footed tables, and family portraits hanging on the walls.

After a succession of financial setbacks, Col. Dummett moved to St. Augustine and conveyed the plantation to his son, Douglas, Before moving to what is now the Titusville area, the younger Dummett served as the first postmaster at Tomoka in Volusia County, where he farmed sugarcane during the 1820s and 1830s. He was one of only a few planters at the time who also cultivated oranges, selling his first crop in 1828 and later transplanting some of the trees to his groves on Merritt Island.

== Second Seminole War ==
Early in 1836, during the Second Seminole War, Douglas Dummett joined a militia company known as the Mosquito Roarers and was assigned the rank of captain. He was wounded in the neck while defending a neighbor's sugar plantation at the battle of Dunlawton Plantation. After recovering from his wounds, he married the socialite Frances Hunter in 1837, the same year he became a member of the Territorial Council. His wife petitioned for a divorce in 1844.

== Move to New Smyrna ==
Failing to adapt to city life in Tallahassee, Dummett returned to his home on the north end of Mosquito Lagoon. In 1843 he filed for a new homestead under the Armed Occupation Act and built his home near New Smyrna. He then became deputy collector for the nearby port and began a new romance with a young mulatto girl named Leandra Fernandez; contravening an 1832 Territorial Act, Dummett started a family with her.

== Family ==
Douglas Dummett had a son and three daughters. After his favorite child, Charles, died from a hunting mishap in 1860, Dummett moved his family to the remote southern end of the Mosquito Lagoon in present-day Brevard County. It is uncertain when Dummett became aware of the orange trees in this area near the old haulover used to transit small boats over a narrow strip of land between Mosquito Lagoon and the Indian River. It has been reported that his first shipment of oranges, 500 barrels, was in 1828. These may have been taken from the wild sour trees found along the lagoon. It is widely asserted, though, that Dummett discovered some sweet orange trees on the old Turnbull lands and began grafting sweet buds to the root stock of the common sour orange trees of the haulover area before 1835.

== Indian River oranges ==
Dummett's quest for seclusion led him to devote much of his time to this well-protected grove lodged between two large temperate lagoons. It is thought that Dummett's experiments with grafting, as well as the mild lagoon climate, helped his grove survive the record-setting freeze of 1835 that killed groves throughout the territory.

Dummett's oranges were known for their flavor, and commanded a premium of one dollar per box in New York. He shared his knowledge of the grafting and cultivation of citrus with many of the new settlers in the north Indian River area, and lived near his grove until his death in 1873. During the late 1800s his techniques spread south along the Indian River Lagoon, and were eventually adopted by other growers around Florida.

In 1930 the Federal Trade Commission was forced to issue an order to stop growers in other areas of the state from labeling their oranges "Indian River Citrus".
