= J. Saxton Lloyd =

American businessman involved in marketing and car racing

Joseph Saxton Lloyd
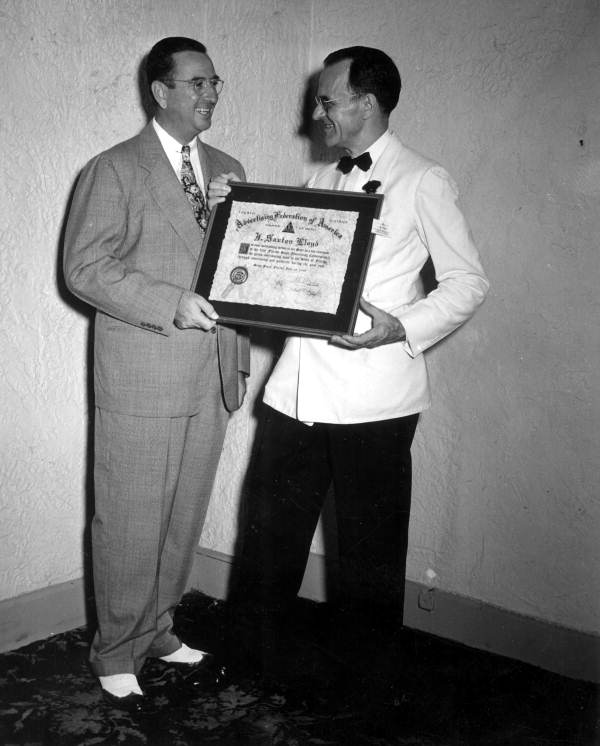
- Lloyd (right) in 1947
- Born: 1907; Savannah, Georgia, United States
- Died: 1991 (aged 83–84); Florida
- Occupation: Businessman
- Known for: Lloyd Lake on the Daytona International Speedway was named after him

Joseph Saxton Lloyd (1907–1991) was an American businessman in the mid-to-late twentieth century. He was born in Savannah, Georgia, and was a longtime resident of Daytona Beach, Florida.

== Early life ==
Joseph Saxton Lloyd lived in Jacksonville, Florida, with his parents from 1916 to 1923 and then moved to Orlando, Florida. They then moved to Daytona Beach, where he finished high school at Seabreeze High School. Saxton's father was a Frigidaire salesperson. Saxton's first job was with the Buick car dealership.

== Civic career ==
When Saxton Lloyd was 22, he was asked to head a Chamber of Commerce advertising scheme to attract beachgoers in Daytona. Later in life he served as chairman of an advertising advisory committee for Florida and as chairman of the State Advertising and Tourist Development Division of the State Chamber of Commerce. In 1953 he served as chairman of the Florida State Racing Commission. In 1955 Saxton Lloyd launched the Florida State Development Commission. He replaced Henrietta Poynter on the St. Augustine Historical Preservation and Restoration Commission, which later became the Historic St. Augustine Preservation Board. Saxton Lloyd was friends with Mary McLeod Bethune and for a time served on the board of directors for the Bethune-Cookman College.

== Business career ==
Saxton Lloyd became the owner of the Buick-Cadillac agency and President of Daytona Motor Company. After World War II, Lloyd reorganized the Florida Automobile Dealers Association. He also became the first chairman of the Florida Advertising Commission. Lloyd was the president of the National Automobile Dealers Association from 1952-1953, a high honor. He was responsible for getting route U.S. 1 fourlaning financed through four counties in Florida, a feat of which he was extremely proud. In 1990 Lloyd's Buick-Cadillac-BMW office celebrated its 60th anniversary.

== Family and legacy ==
Lloyd Lake, on the Daytona International Speedway, is named for Saxton Lloyd. The founder of NASCAR, Bill France Sr., named the lake (originally a retention pond) for his friend when it was constructed in the late 1950s. Lloyd had given France his first job as a mechanic. Lloyd also gifted Sugar Mill Gardens, a 13-acre (5.3 ha) property of sugar mill ruins and indigo vats, to Volusia County. Saxton married Adelaide Crane in 1934.
