= Benjamin Putnam Calhoun =

American lawyer and politician

Benjamin Putnam Calhoun (1855 - 1907) was an American lawyer and politician.

He was born in St. Augustine, Florida. He was a one term state legislator who served on the South Carolina House of Representatives. A Democrat, he served as one of five representatives for Orangeburg, South Carolina. Benjamin K. Randolph was state senator for the area.

His wife died a year after he did on July 26, 1908. An 1886 Bar Association of New Mexico meeting report identified him as living in Grants, New Mexico.
