= Hernández–Capron Trail =

Long-distance hiking trail in the United States

Hernandez–Capron Trail
- Length: 200 mi (320 km)
- Location: Volusia County and Brevard County, Florida, United States

The Hernández–Capron Trail also known as the Hernández Trail is a historic trail in Eastern Florida (then Mosquito County) extending between New Smyrna in Volusia County and Fort Pierce in St. Lucie County. It was the first road from St. Augustine to the Fort Pierce area. It was originally cut through the Atlantic Coastal Ridge by Joseph Marion Hernández. The majority of the trail is in wilderness, although some portions traverse developed areas.

== Markers ==
There is a historical marker (Marker ID: FLHM F-69) commemorating the Hernandez Trail in Cocoa. The marker is at 28°21.35′N 80°44.006′W on West King Street (Florida Route 520) west of South Cocoa Boulevard (U.S. 1), on the right when traveling west. The marker is located east of the railroad crossing. The marker is inscribed with the following text:

One half mile to the west ran the Hernandez Trail used during the Seminole War. It connected forts along the east Coast to Ft. Dallas in Miami and across from Ft. Pierce and Ft. Capron to Ft. Brooke near Tampa. Brig. General Joseph M. Hernandez, born 1792 in St. Augustine, served as the first delegate to Congress and held a number of positions of importance in the Territory of East Florida. In 1837 under orders from General Thomas S. Jesup, he captured Indian Chief Osceola.
