= Leigh Read County, Florida =

Leigh Read County was a county in Florida proposed to honor General and Legislator Leigh Read following his assassination. In 1842, the Democrats in the Florida Territorial Council passed a bill that would have renamed Mosquito County, which at the time included all of today's Orange, Seminole, and Volusia as well as parts of Lake, Osceola, Polk and Brevard Counties, to Leigh Read County. Many claim that the bill passed the Territorial Council, but there are no legislative records of the bill. What happened is unclear, but some claim a clerk withheld the bill, while others claim Whig governor Richard K. Call, who routinely clashed with Read, refused to sign the bill. One historian says Governor Call claims to have signed the bill, "but through some misadventure the law never appeared on the books."
