= Troy, Florida =

Coordinates: 30.0275°N 83.0126°W

- Interactive map of Troy, Florida
- Country: United States
- State: Florida
- County: Lafayette County
- Settled: 1845

Troy is an abandoned town in Lafayette County, Florida, United States that served as its county seat. Just like Fort Fanning, Fort "McKoon" (Macomb), Branford, Luraville and Wilcox, it was built as a boat landing on the Suwannee River about nine miles upriver from Branford. It was also known at times as Macintosh. According to one account, it was built between 1860 and 1862, so close to the water that the courthouse had to be moved a quarter of a mile because of flooding. A second account says its log courthouse was built in 1857.

Most of the town was burned in the chaos following the end of the Civil War. The first account says that the county records were lost, but the second contradicts this, saying that the local tax assessor and clerk of the circuit court hid them at his home. A third account agrees that the county records were saved by being hidden in a corn crib. The town was rebuilt a quarter of a mile away, named New Troy, and remained the county seat until the courthouse burned again and county governance was moved to Mayo in 1893.

== See also ==
Maps showing Troy (Macintosh) and New Troy archived here.
