= Mosquito County, Florida =

Former county in Florida, United States

Coordinates: 29.3085°N 81.0960°W

Mosquito County
- Former county
- Country: United States
- State: Florida
- County seat: near Ormond (1824–1835), New Smyrna (1835–1843), Enterprise (1843–1844)
- Founded: December 29, 1824
- Disestablished: March 14, 1844

Population (1830)
  - Total: 733 (15 heads of families)

Mosquito County (also labeled on maps as Musquito County) is the historic name of an early county that once comprised most of the eastern part of Florida. Its land included all of present-day Volusia, Brevard, Indian River, St. Lucie, Marion, Martin, Seminole, Osceola, Orange, Lake, Polk and Palm Beach counties.

Mosquito County was disbanded in 1844.

== History ==
The whole east coast of central Florida was known as "Los Musquitos" starting from the 1500s until 1844.

After Andrew Jackson received authority to take possession of the Florida territory ceded by Spain in 1821, he divided the whole territory into two counties, along the Suwannee River. All of the area west formed Escambia, and all of it east formed St. Johns County. This was largely consistent with the previously existing British colonies of West Florida and East Florida.

Mosquito County was split off from St. Johns on December 29, 1824, and the county seat was designated at John Bunch's house just west of the present location of Tomoka State Park. At roughly 220 miles (350 km) long by 90 miles (140 km) wide, it was the largest county in the new territory.

In 1830, the census listed 15 heads of households, and a total of 733 persons, mostly slaves. In January 1835, the county seat was moved to New Smyrna on Bunch's forced-labor farm. However, the Second Seminole War had largely depopulated Mosquito County of white settlers by the end of that year. In 1838, there was so little activity in the county that the St. Johns County Clerk was designated to keep the records of the county. However, by 1840, although the census listed no white inhabitants other than the military personnel based at Fort Pierce and New Smyrna, the county had its own officials.

In 1841, legislation was introduced and passed to rename the county "Leigh Read County". However the governor did not sign the bill within the legal time, so the renaming did not take place.

In 1842, the Armed Occupation Act was passed, providing a quarter section (160 acres or 65 ha) to any head of family who settled on property south of Ocala/Ormond.

In 1843, the county seat had moved again to Enterprise.

In 1844, the expansive area of Mosquito County was cut in half with the southern half being named St. Lucie County, and the northern half being renamed Orange County. St. Lucie County was renamed Brevard County in 1855.

== See also ==
- Spanish Florida
- East Florida
- Florida Territory
- Hernández–Capron Trail
- Charles Downing
- Douglas Dummett
- William Henry Brockenbrough
- Frederick Weedon
