= Francis L. V. Hoppin =

American architect and painter (1866–1941)

Col. Frank Hoppin
- Born: Francis Laurens Vinton Hoppin; October 7, 1866; Providence, Rhode Island, US
- Died: October 9, 1941 (aged 75); Newport, Rhode Island, US
- Education: Brown University; Massachusetts Institute of Technology
- Occupation: Architect
- Spouses: Sarah Carnes Weeks (m. 1893, divorced) Mary Latham Gurnee (m. 1910)
- Practice: McKim, Mead and White; Hoppin, Read & Hoppin; Hoppin & Koen
- Projects: The Mount, New York City Police Headquarters, Wadsworth Mansion, Springwood

Colonel Francis Laurens Vinton Hoppin (October 7, 1866 – October 9, 1941) was a prominent American architect and painter from Providence, Rhode Island.

== Early life ==
Hopping was born on October 7, 1866, in Providence, Rhode Island. He was a son of Dr. Washington Hoppin (1824–1867), a homeopathic physician, and Louise Claire (née Vinton) Hoppin (1832–1891). Among his siblings was Howard Hoppin, Louise Claire Hoppin (a founder of the Red Cross), Harriet (née Hoppin) Jacob, and Washington Hoppin, Jr.

Francis was from a prominent and talented Providence family; his paternal grandparents were Thomas Coles Hoppin and Harriet Dunn (née Jones) Hoppin. His maternal grandparents were Maj. John Rogers Vinton (who was killed during the Siege of Veracruz and became the namesake of Fort Vinton) and Lucretia Dutton (née Parker) Vinton of Boston. Among his paternal uncles were Augustus Hoppin, a prominent illustrator (who wrote about the family in his novel, Recollections of Auton House), and Dr. Courtland Hoppin, also a homeopathic physician, was the grandfather of Courtland Hector Hoppin, a pioneer in the field of animated film. His maternal uncle, David Hammond Vinton, Quartermaster General of Florida (who married Pamela, a daughter of Maj. Gen. Jacob Brown), was the father of The Right Reverend Alexander Hamilton Vinton, the first Bishop of Western Massachusetts, and Harriette Arnold Vinton (wife of Dr. John Clarkson Jay, son of Dr. John Clarkson Jay).

After early training at the Trinity Military Institute, Providence, he prepared for a career in the U.S. Army, but left to study architecture at Brown University and at the Massachusetts Institute of Technology. After MIT, he went to Paris for training, but apparently not at the École des Beaux Arts as has been reported.

== Career ==
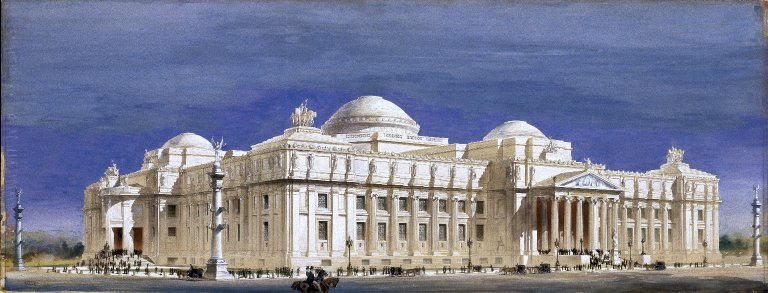
Hoppin's drawing of the design for The Brooklyn Museum.

On returning to the United States, Hoppin joined the firm of McKim, Mead and White in 1886. Reportedly, while with the firm, McKim noted Hoppin's exceptional skill at rendering with one architectural historian writing: "Among architects that had a facility for perspective Francis L.V. Hoppin stands out..." He became the office specialist in perspective, exemplified in his drawings for the Century Club and The Brooklyn Museum. Fellow office architect, Egerton Swartwout, characterized Hoppin's drawings as "colored, blue sky and trees where there aren't any, and flying shadows on the building, you know, a real snappy piece of work."

In 1890, he joined his brother Howard and Spencer P. Read to form a new firm was known as Hoppin, Read & Hoppin. They worked together until 1896, when Francis left to found the firm of Hoppin & Koen in New York City with Terence A. Koen. The firm was based is known for police stations, fire stations and dignified town houses in the Beaux Arts style. Among his apprentices at Hoppin & Koen were Robert P. Huntington and Dudley Newton, Jr., the son of a prominent Newport architect.

The firm became well known for its large country houses in the most fashionable parts of America during the Gilded Age. They designed homes for Francis Vinton Greene (a relative), James F. D. Lanier, Andrew C. Zabriskie, John J. Wysong, Harris C. Fahnestock, Charles Oliver Iselin, Henry Clews, and William Watts Sherman. One of Hoppin's best known works was The Mount, Edith Wharton's home in Lenox. Wharton commissioned the firm to design her Lenox residence (with major input from her at every stage of the process), after having a falling out with Ogden Codman, Jr. Hoppin retired in 1923 to pursue a career as an artist, and Koen died the following year in 1923.

When the Spanish–American War began, Hoppin enlisted in the 12th Regiment of the New York National Guard, reaching the rank of Major, and at one time was Adjutant General of the First Brigade, New York National Guard. He was later granted the title of "Colonel" by Gov. Charles Seymour Whitman, which he answered for the rest of his life.

=== Painting career ===
In 1925 and 1929, Hoppin gave a one-man show of his watercolors in New York. He largely painted on location at visits to Soissons, Rheims, Arras, Ypres, Rome, Paris, Newport and Bar Harbor, Maine.

He produced dozens of watercolors usually of architectural subjects or of gardens.

=== Notable architectural projects ===
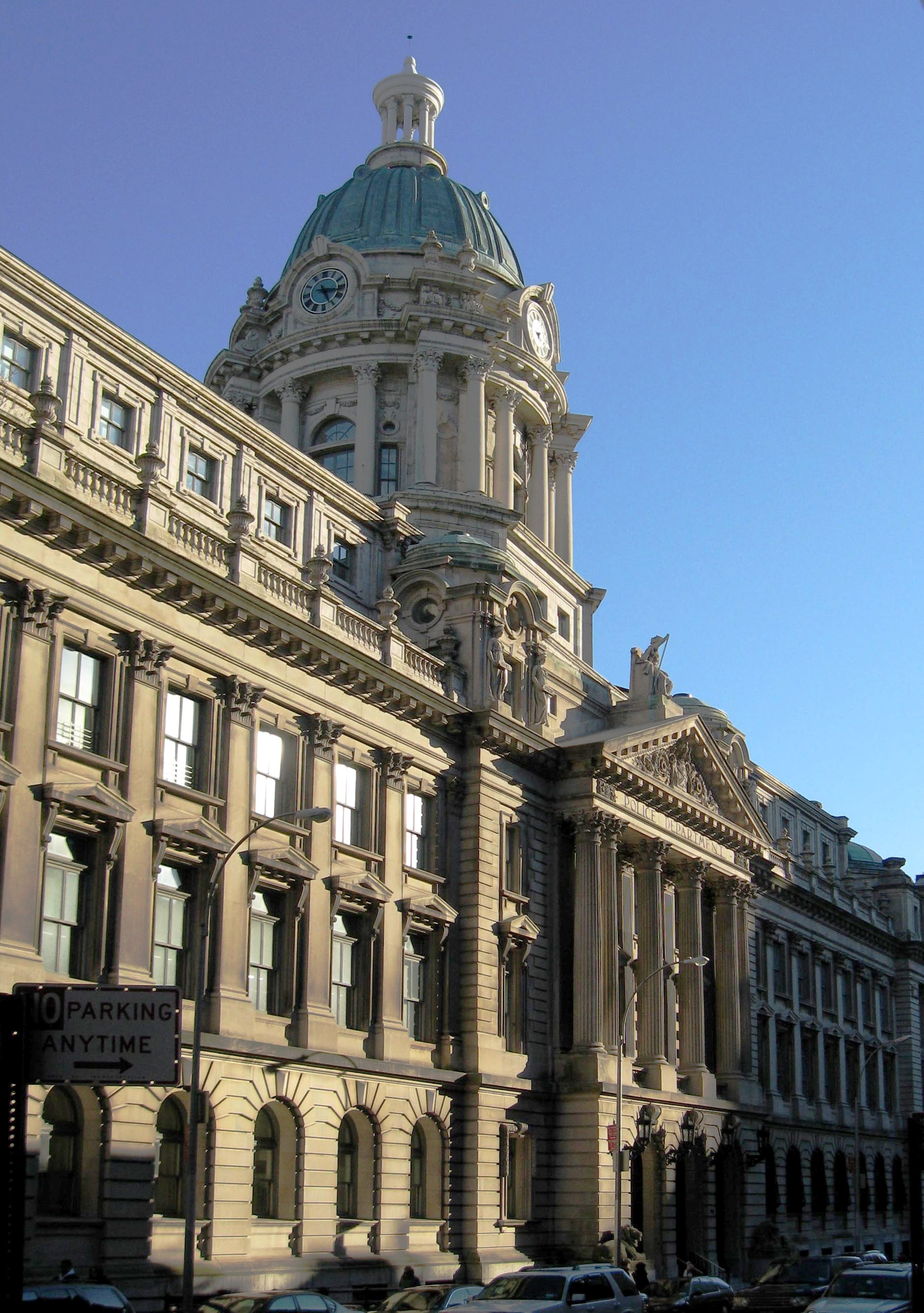
New York City Police Headquarters, 1909

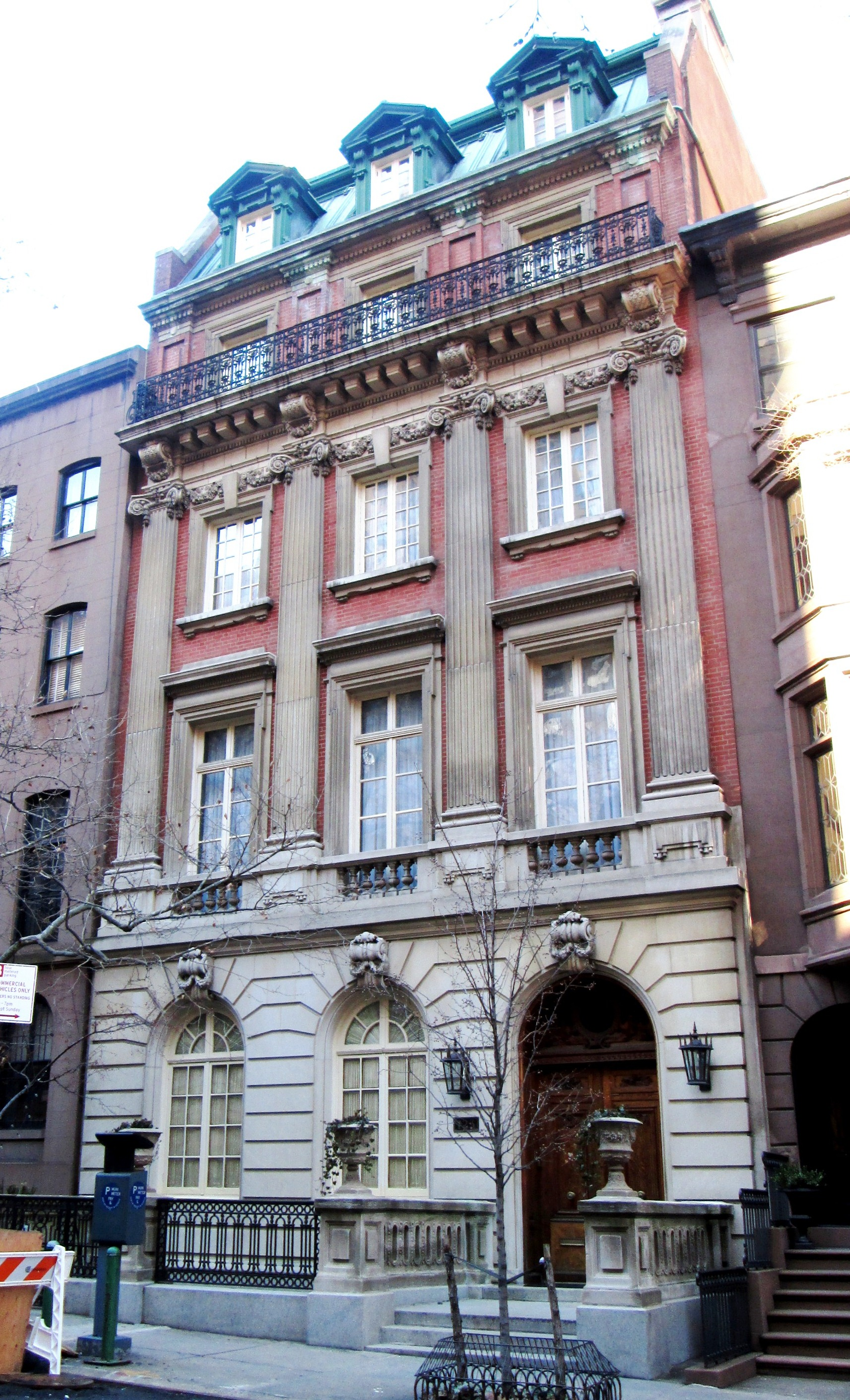
James F. D. Lanier Residence, 1901–1903

As Hoppin, Read & Hoppin, 1890–1896:

- Charles Street Grammar School (1891), 291 Charles St., Providence, RI - Demolished.
- Olney Street Fire Station (1892), 355 Hope St., Providence, RI
- Psi Upsilon Residence (1892), 4 Manning St., Providence, RI - Demolished in 1972.
- Harry A. Waldron Residence (1893), 9 Stimson Ave., Providence, RI
- Hayter Reed Residence (1894), Ottawa, Ontario - Demolished in 1970.
- Howard Hoppin Residence (c. 1894), 86 Brown St., Providence, RI - His brother's residence.
- Maxcy Hall (1895), 108 George St., Brown University, Providence, RI - Altered.
- Stephen A. Cooke Residence (1895), 37 Manning St., Providence, RI

As Hoppin & Koen, 1896–1922:

- Buildings in the Riverside–West 105th Street Historic District (1899–1902), Manhattan, New York
- Charles W. Cooper Residence (1900), Tuxedo Park, NY
- Francis Vinton Greene Residence "Armsea Hall" (1901), Newport, RI (next to Hammersmith Farm) (Note: President John F. Kennedy privately leased the estate as his summer White House for his planned 1964 summer season, but was assassinated in 1963.) - Demolished in 1969
- James F. D. Lanier Residence (1901–1903), 123 East 35th Street, New York, NY.
- Andrew C. Zabriskie Residence "Blithewood" (1902), Annandale-on-Hudson, NY
- Edward and Edith Wharton Residence "The Mount" (1902), 2 Plunkett Street, Lenox, MA.
- Richard Thornton Wilson Jr. Residence (1905), 15 East 57th Street, New York, NY.
- Morton Memorial Library (1905), Rhinecliff, NY
- New York City Police Headquarters (1905–1909), 240 Centre Street, New York, NY
- Clarence S. Wadsworth Residence (1909–1911) Middletown, CT
- George Rose Residence "Overland House" (1910), Old Westbury, NY - Demolished
- New York City Fire Department Building (1911), East 111th Street and Second Avenue, New York, NY.
- Mount Morris Theater (1911–1912), at Fifth Avenue and 116th Street, New York, NY.
- Newbold Morris Residence (1913), Lenox, MA
- Albany County Courthouse (1913–1915), Eagle Street, Albany, NY - Renovation and expansion in 2006.
- Sara Delano Roosevelt Residence renovation (1915), Hyde Park, NY
- Sterling Postley Residence "Framewood" (1918), Upper Brookville, NY
- United States Housing Corporation Historic District (1919), New London, CT
- Theodore Frelinghuysen Residence "Southways" (1919–1920), Palm Beach, FL (Note: Southways was known as the "Winter White House" after President Warren Harding stayed there as a guest.)
- George B. McClellan Jr. Residence (1922), Princeton, NJ
- George B. McClellan Jr. Residence (1922), Washington, D.C.
- Manhattan Terminal of the Brooklyn Bridge (undated), Not constructed.

== Personal life ==
On June 3, 1893, Hoppin was married to Sarah Carnes Weeks (1863–1956) at Oyster Bay on Long Island. She was the youngest daughter of John Abeel Weeks (son of Robert D. Weeks, co-founder and president of the New York Stock Exchange) and Alice Hathaway (née Delano) Weeks (a distant cousin of Franklin D. Roosevelt). Sarah was a first cousin of Henry W. DeForest and Robert W. DeForest.

In 1910, he married, secondly, to Mary Latham Gurnee (1880–1968), a daughter of Walter Scott Gurnee and Mary Isabelle (née Barney) Gurnee (daughter of Danford N. Barney, president of Wells Fargo & Company). After his retirement, the Hoppins were frequent hosts at their homes in Newport, and Palm Beach.

Hoppin died at Auton House, his residence on Harrison Avenue in Newport, Rhode Island, on October 9, 1941. Hoppin had two services, first at Emmanuel Episcopal Church in Newport and second at St. Thomas Episcopal Church in New York City before being buried at Sleepy Hollow Cemetery at Tarrytown, New York. After his death, his widow remarried twice; first to Alfred Hudson Townley in 1949 (former Justice of the First Judicial Department in New York and widower of Martha Depew Strang, niece of U.S. Senator Chauncey Depew); and, after his death in 1954, Cyril Barthurst Judge (whose late wife, Annie Lyman, had also died in 1954) past president of the Newport Country Club, in 1963.
