= Howard Hoppin =

American architect (1856–1940)

- Born: April 17, 1856; Providence, Rhode Island, US
- Died: October 19, 1940 (aged 84)
- Occupation: Architect

Howard Hoppin (April 17, 1856 – October 19, 1940) was an American architect from Providence, Rhode Island.

== Early life ==
Hoppin was born on April 17, 1856, in Providence, Rhode Island. He was a son of Dr. Washington Hoppin (1824–1867), a homeopathic physician, and Louise Claire (née Vinton) Hoppin (1832–1891). Among his siblings were Francis L. V. Hoppin, Louise Claire Hoppin (a founder of the Red Cross), Harriet (née Hoppin) Jacob, and Washington Hoppin, Jr.

Hoppin was from a prominent and talented Providence family; his paternal grandparents were Thomas Coles Hoppin and Harriet Dunn (née Jones) Hoppin. His maternal grandparents were Maj. John Rogers Vinton (who was killed during the Siege of Veracruz and became the namesake of Fort Vinton) and Lucretia Dutton (née Parker) Vinton of Boston. Among his paternal uncles were Augustus Hoppin, a prominent illustrator (who wrote about the family in his novel, Recollections of Auton House), and Dr. Courtland Hoppin, also a homeopathic physician, was the grandfather of Courtland Hector Hoppin, a pioneer in the field of animated film. His maternal uncle, David Hammond Vinton, Quartermaster General of Florida (who married Pamela, a daughter of Maj. Gen. Jacob Brown), was the father of The Right Reverend Alexander Hamilton Vinton, the first Bishop of Western Massachusetts, and Harriette Arnold Vinton (wife of Dr. John Clarkson Jay, son of Dr. John Clarkson Jay).

== Career ==
Selected works

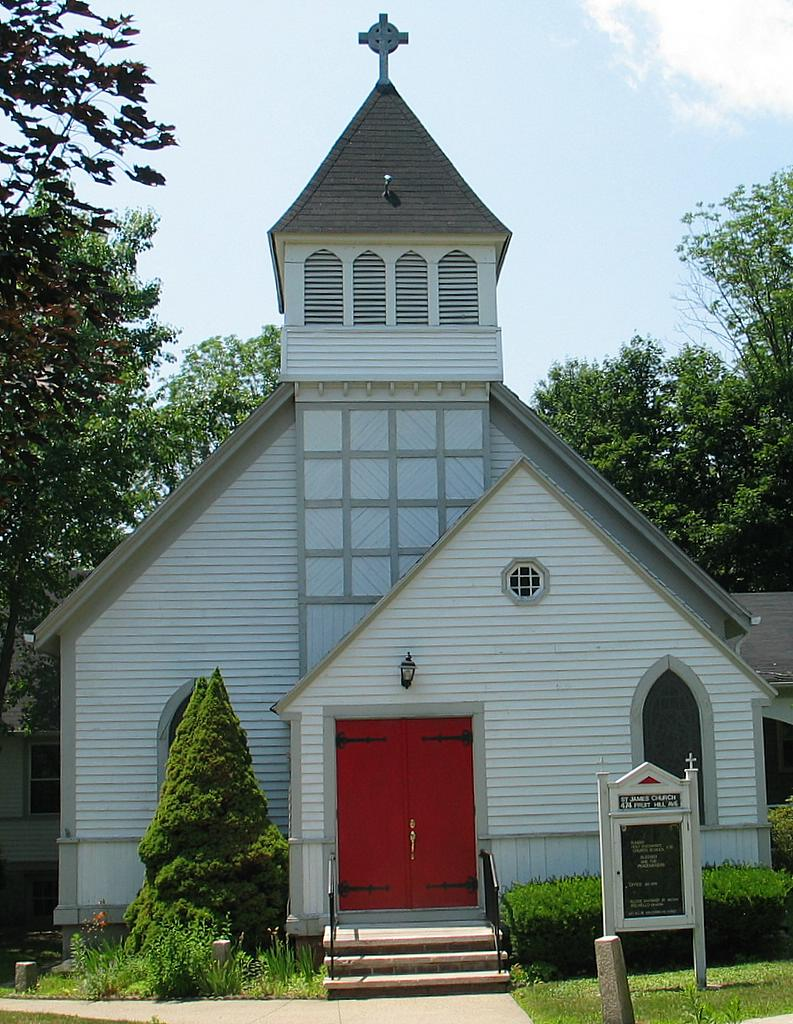
St. James Church, Fruit Hill (1879)

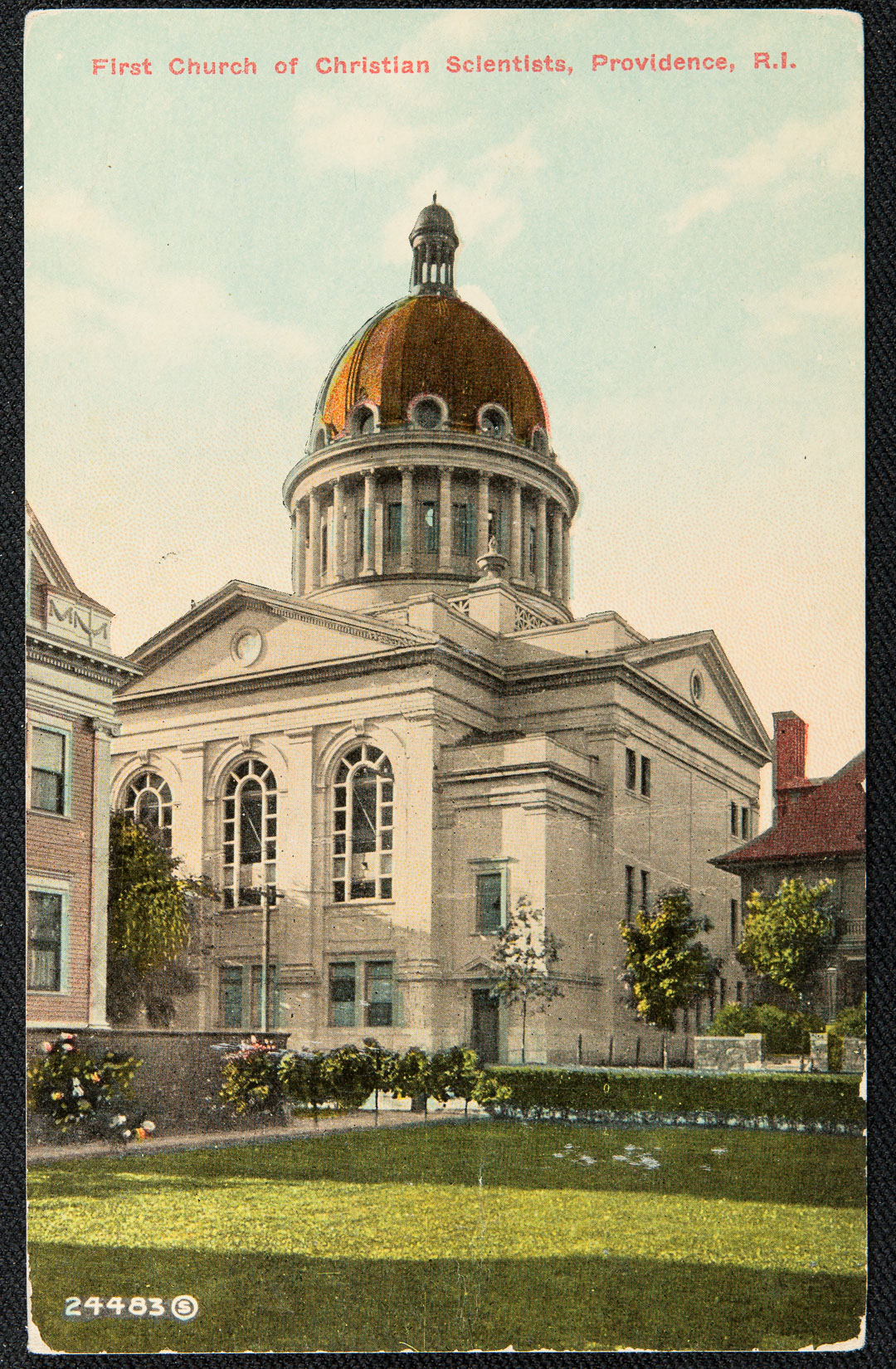
First Church of Christ, Scientist, Providence (1906–1913)

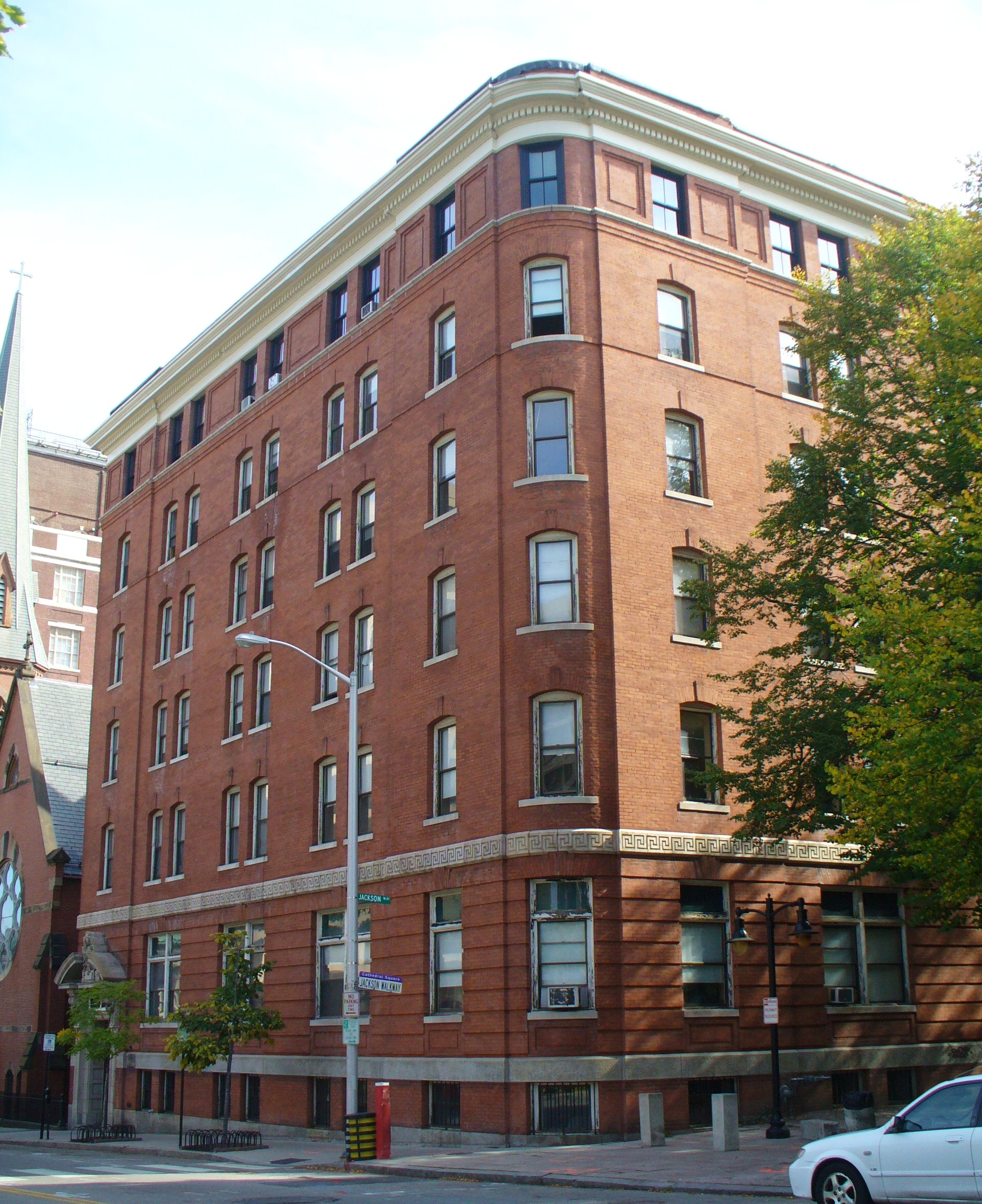
Y. W. C. A. Building, Providence (1905)

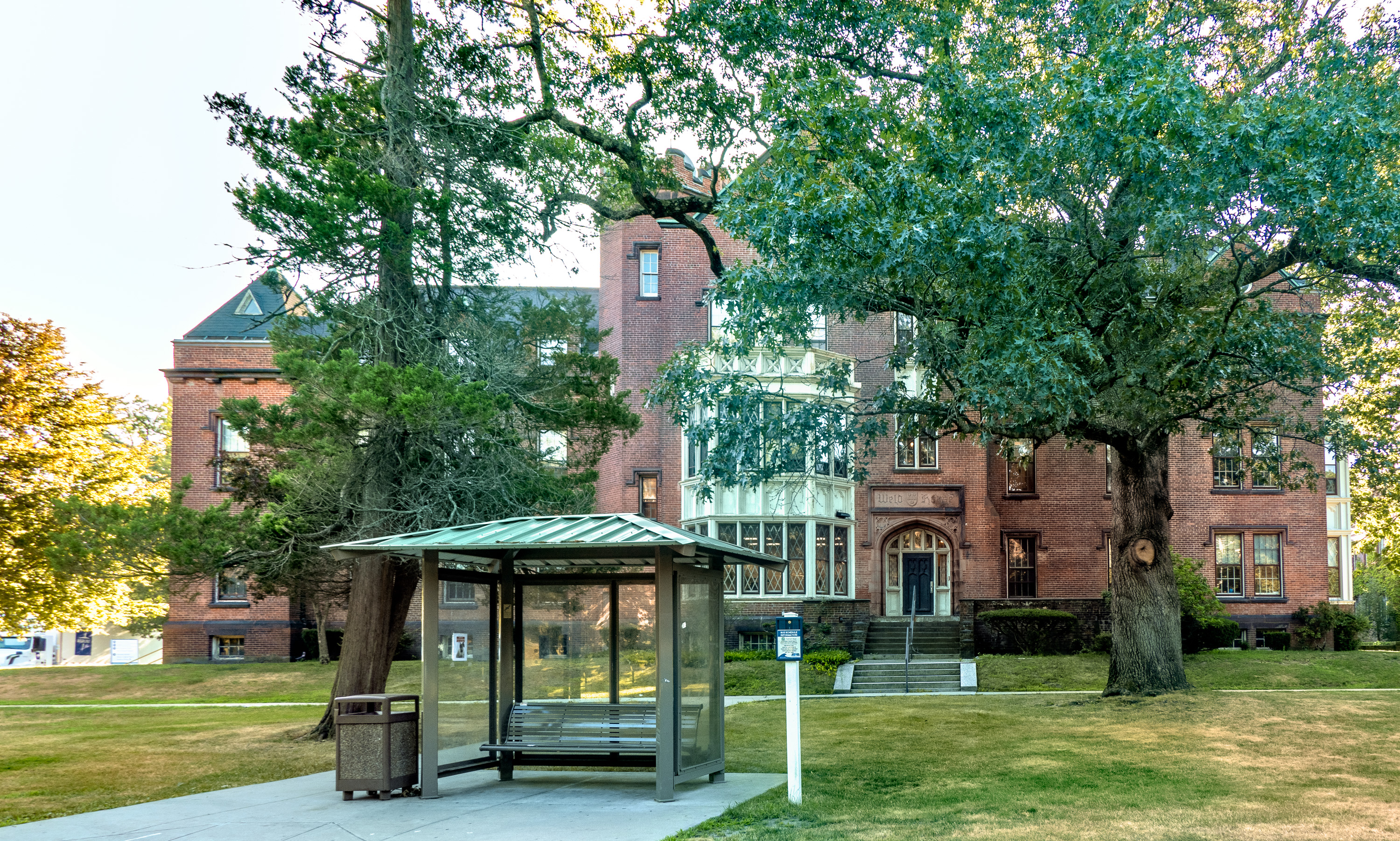
Weld House, Butler Hospital (1900)

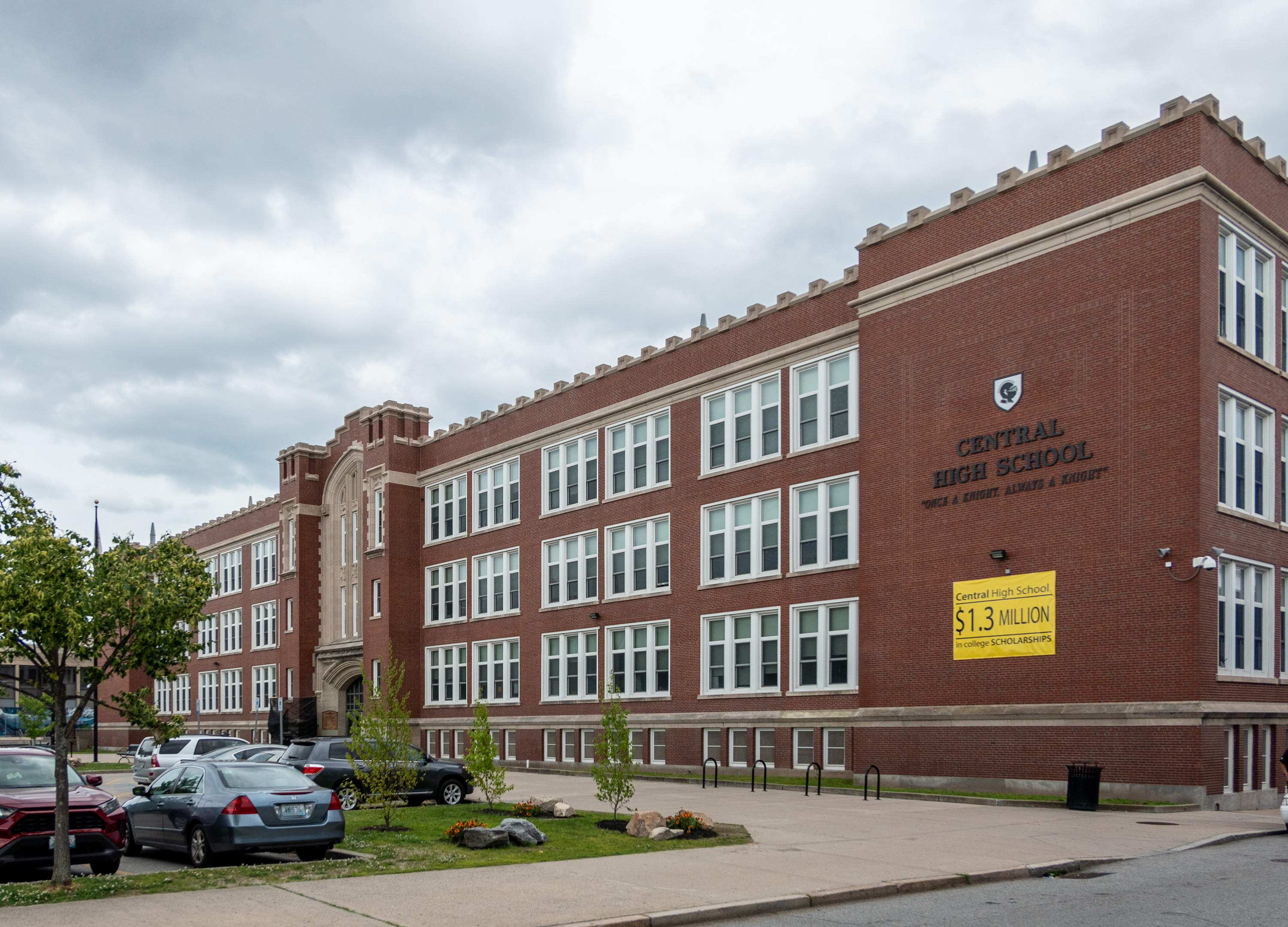
Central High School, Providence (1921)

Hoppin began his architectural practice in Providence in the late 1870s. Early on, he developed a specialty in small churches. He worked alone until 1890, when he was joined by Spencer P. Read and his brother, Francis L. V. Hoppin. The new firm was known as Hoppin, Read & Hoppin. They worked together until 1896, when Francis left to found the firm of Hoppin & Koen in New York City. It was at this time that Hoppin took Edward F. Ely (1858-1920) into the firm, as Hoppin & Ely. In 1907, Ely left to become a member of the city's Board of Park Commissioners. At this point, Frederick E. Field became partner. This arrangement lasted until 1922, when Thomas J. Hill Peirce, joined, the firm becoming Hoppin, Field & Peirce. It was dissolved within a few years, at which point Hoppin appears to have retired.

=== Architectural works ===
In private practice, before 1890:

- St. James Episcopal Church, 474 Fruit Hill Ave., Fruit Hill, RI (1879)
- Rathlin (George L. Bradley Estate), Bradley Rd., Pomfret, CT (1882) - Demolished.
- St. Barnabas' Episcopal Church, 3257 Post Rd., Apponaug, RI (1882) - Burned in 1911.
- Christ Episcopal Church, 527 Pomfret St., Pomfret, CT (1883)
- Union Chapel, 1003 Buttonwoods Ave., Buttonwoods, RI (1884)
- Oberthal (Frederick W. Chapin House), 6 Needles Eye Rd., Pomfret, CT (c.1885)
- Rectory for Christ Episcopal Church, 521 Pomfret St., Pomfret, CT (1885)
- Whitfield Apartments, 280-300 Broad St., Providence, RI (1886) - Demolished.
- Truman Beckwith House, 205 Governor St., Providence, RI (1887)
- All Saints Episcopal Church, 111 Greenwich Ave., Pontiac, RI (c.1888)
- Obwebetuck Inn, Sanitarium Rd., South Windham, CT (c.1888) - Burned in 1907.
- St. Mark's Episcopal Church, 10 Turner Ave., Riverside, RI (1888) - Demolished.

As Hoppin, Read & Hoppin, 1890-1896:

- Charles Street Grammar School, 291 Charles St., Providence, RI (1891) - Demolished.
- Olney Street Fire Station, 355 Hope St., Providence, RI (1892)
- Psi Upsilon House, 4 Manning St., Providence, RI (1892) - Demolished in 1972.
- Harry A. Waldron House, 9 Stimson Ave., Providence, RI (1893)
- Howard Hoppin House, 86 Brown St., Providence, RI (c.1894) - The architect's own residence.
- Maxcy Hall, 108 George St., Brown University, Providence, RI (1895) - Altered.

As Hoppin & Ely, 1896-1907:

- Goddard House, Butler Hospital, Providence, RI (1897)
- C. Franklin Nugent House, 67 Orchard Ave., Providence, RI (1898)
- St. Stephen's Episcopal Church (Tower), 114 George St., Providence, RI (1900)
- Weld House, Butler Hospital, Providence, RI (1900)
- President's House, Brown University, Providence, RI (1901) - Demolished 1953.
- Administration Building (Van Wickle Hall), Brown University, Providence, RI (1902) - Demolished 1962.
- Caswell Hall, Brown University, Providence, RI (1902)
- Memorial Hall (Remodeling), RISD, Providence, RI (1902) - Built 1853.
- Perimeter Fence, Brown University, Providence, RI (1903)
- Lapham Building, 290 Westminster St., Providence, RI (1904)
- Y. W. C. A. Building, 254 Washington St., Providence, RI (1905)

As Hoppin & Field, 1907-1922:

- First Church of Christ, Scientist, 71 Prospect St., Providence, RI (1906–13)
- Horatio E. Bellows House, 96 Alumni Ave., Providence, RI (1908)
- Burroughs Apartments, 372-374 Lloyd Ave., Providence, RI (1909)
- Jenkins Street Primary School, 53 Jenkins St., Providence, RI (c.1909) - Demolished.
- U. S. Post Office, 1619 Lonsdale Ave., Lonsdale, RI (1909) - Built by the Lonsdale Company, leased to the post office.
- E. H. Baker House, 410 S. Washington St., North Attleborough, MA (c.1910)
- Varnum Memorial Armory, 6 Main St., East Greenwich, RI (1913)
- St. Barnabas' Episcopal Church, 3257 Post Rd., Apponaug, RI (1917-1926)
- Samuel W. Bridgham School, 359 Carpenter St., Providence, RI (1919)
- Central High School, Fricker St., Providence, RI (1921)

As Hoppin, Field & Peirce, 1922-?:

- Bradford School, Church St., Bradford, RI (1923) - Altered.
- High Street School, 140 High St., Westerly, RI (1923)
- Henry Warner Budlong Memorial Library, 3267 Post Rd., Apponaug, RI (1924–25)
- The Providence, 18 Boulevard Ter., Middletown, RI (1924)
