= Hoppin =

Hoppin is a surname. Its roots have been tracked to medieval England where its believed to have been a diminutive form of the given name Hob, which itself is a medieval variant of Robert

Notable people with the surname include:

- Augustus Hoppin (1828–1896), American book illustrator
- Courtland Hector Hoppin (1906–1974), American artist
- Howard Hoppin (1856–1940), American architect
- James Mason Hoppin (1820-1906), American educator and writer
- Richard Hoppin (1913-1991), American musicologist
