= Joseph Marion Hernández =

Spanish-American planter, politician and military officer

Joseph M. Hernández
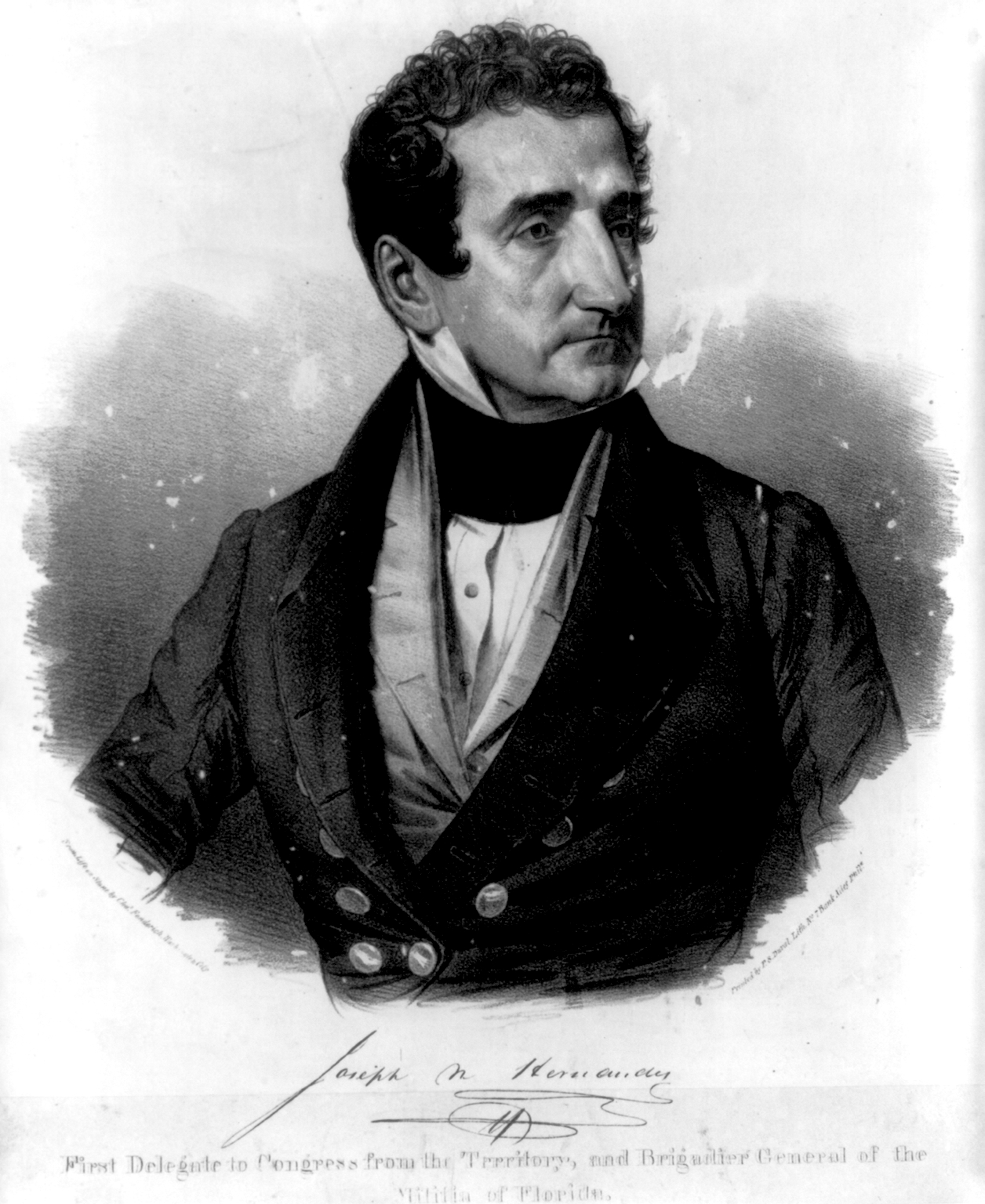

Delegate to the United States House of Representatives from Florida Territory's at-large district
- In office September 30, 1822 – March 3, 1823
- Preceded by: Office established
- Succeeded by: Richard K. Call

Personal details
- Born: May 26, 1788; St. Augustine, Spanish Florida, Viceroyalty of New Spain
- Died: June 8, 1857 (aged 69) Matanzas, Captaincy General of Cuba
- Resting place: Necropolis San Carlos Borromeo
- Party: Democratic-Republican Party; Whig Party
- Known for: First Delegate from the Florida Territory and the first Hispanic American to serve in the United States Congress

Joseph Marion Hernández (José Mariano Hernández; May 26, 1788 – June 8, 1857) was a slave-owning Spanish-American planter, politician and military officer. He was the first delegate from the Florida Territory and the first Hispanic American to serve in the United States Congress. A member of the Democratic-Republican Party, he served from September 1822 to March 1823.

== Biography ==
Joseph Marion Hernández was born in St. Augustine, Florida during Florida's second Spanish period. His parents were Minorcans who had originally come to the region as indentured servants in Andrew Turnbull's New Smyrna colony. Prior to the American acquisition of Florida, Hernández owned three plantations south of St. Augustine (in what was then East Florida): San Jose, Mala Compra, and Bella Vista.

He married the widowed Ana María Hill Williams on February 25, 1814, in St. Augustine. Ana María Hill was born on June 6, 1787, in St. Augustine, and was the daughter of the South Carolinian merchant Theophilus Hill and his wife Theresa Thomas; they had immigrated from South Carolina by the 1780s. Hernández and Ana María had at least one child, Dora Hernández. The properties owned by Ana, including a 3,200-acre plantation called "Orange Grove", enabled Hernández to establish himself as a planter of some standing. He had also acquired several profitable land grants during the so-called "Patriot War" in 1812.

After the First Seminole War broke out in the province of West Florida in 1817, Andrew Jackson led a force of 4,800 men into the Floridas in January of the following year, destroying Seminole towns and taking the Spanish fort at St. Marks. The campaign ended in May 1818 with the cession of West Florida to the United States with the signing of the Adams–Onís Treaty on February 22, 1819, following which Hernández pledged his allegiance to the US. The treaty was finally approved by the US Senate on February 22, 1821. Although it is not clear what role Hernández had in the war, he profited from it by receiving more land grants from the Spanish government. The land that he bought or inherited by marriage along with the large holdings he received as service grants from the Spanish crown amounted to 25,670 acres by the time of the annexation to the US.

After the organization of the Florida Territory, he was elected Florida's first Delegate to the United States House of Representatives, and was approved by President James Monroe on September 30, 1822. He thus became the first Hispanic ever to serve in the U.S. Congress. He served for six months, leaving office on March 3, 1823.

During the 1820s, Hernández became a major planter in the territory, his properties producing some of its biggest cash crops, including sugar cane and cotton, with the forced labor of between 60 and 150 enslaved black persons on his three largest holdings, especially the Mala Compra and the St. Joseph plantations. In spite of his success as a planter, Hernández was forced to sell off large tracts of his land during the mid-1820s to discharge debts and make mortgage payments. In 1835 he used his estates as collateral to borrow money and preserve his solvency.

Hernández was appointed to the Florida territorial legislative council by President Monroe, and the appointment renewed by President John Quincy Adams in 1825. He continued running his plantations, which were burned by the Seminoles in the Second Seminole War. The ruins of his plantation Mala Compra is today a preserved archaeological site. He was appointed Brigadier General over a troop of volunteers from the Mosquito Roarers militia during the war and was subsequently commissioned in the United States Army, serving from 1835 to 1838. Hernández was the commanding officer responsible for the imprisonment of the Seminole leader Osceola upon the orders of General Thomas Jesup, as well as the capture of Seminole chiefs Ee-mat-la (King Philip) and Seminole ally Uchee Billy. He retired with the rank of Brigadier General.

Hernández was an unsuccessful Whig candidate for the United States Senate in 1845. He later moved to Cuba and engaged as a planter in the District of Coliseo, near Matanzas, and died at the family's sugar estate, "Audaz", in the District of Coliseo, in Matanzas Province. He is interred in the Del Junco family vault in Necropolis San Carlos Borromeo, Matanzas.

== Hernández–Capron Trail ==
In 1837, while with the U.S. Army, Hernández was ordered to build a road between St. Augustine, Florida and Fort Capron, located near present-day Fort Pierce, Florida, on the St. Lucie River. He directed the blazing and clearing of the route that, 12 years earlier, Col. James Gadsden had cleared along the Atlantic Coastal Ridge to the St. Lucie River. It passed from Fort Capron through Fort Vinton, Fort Drum, Fort Kissimmee, Fort Meade to Fort Brooke (Tampa).

== See also ==
- List of Hispanic Americans in the United States Congress

U.S. House of Representatives
Preceded by none	Delegate to the U.S. House of Representatives from Florida Territory's at-large congressional district September 30, 1822 – March 3, 1823	Succeeded by Richard Keith Call
