= Frelinghuysen Morris House and Studio =

Historic house in Massachusetts, United States

- U.S. National Register of Historic Places
- U.S. Historic district
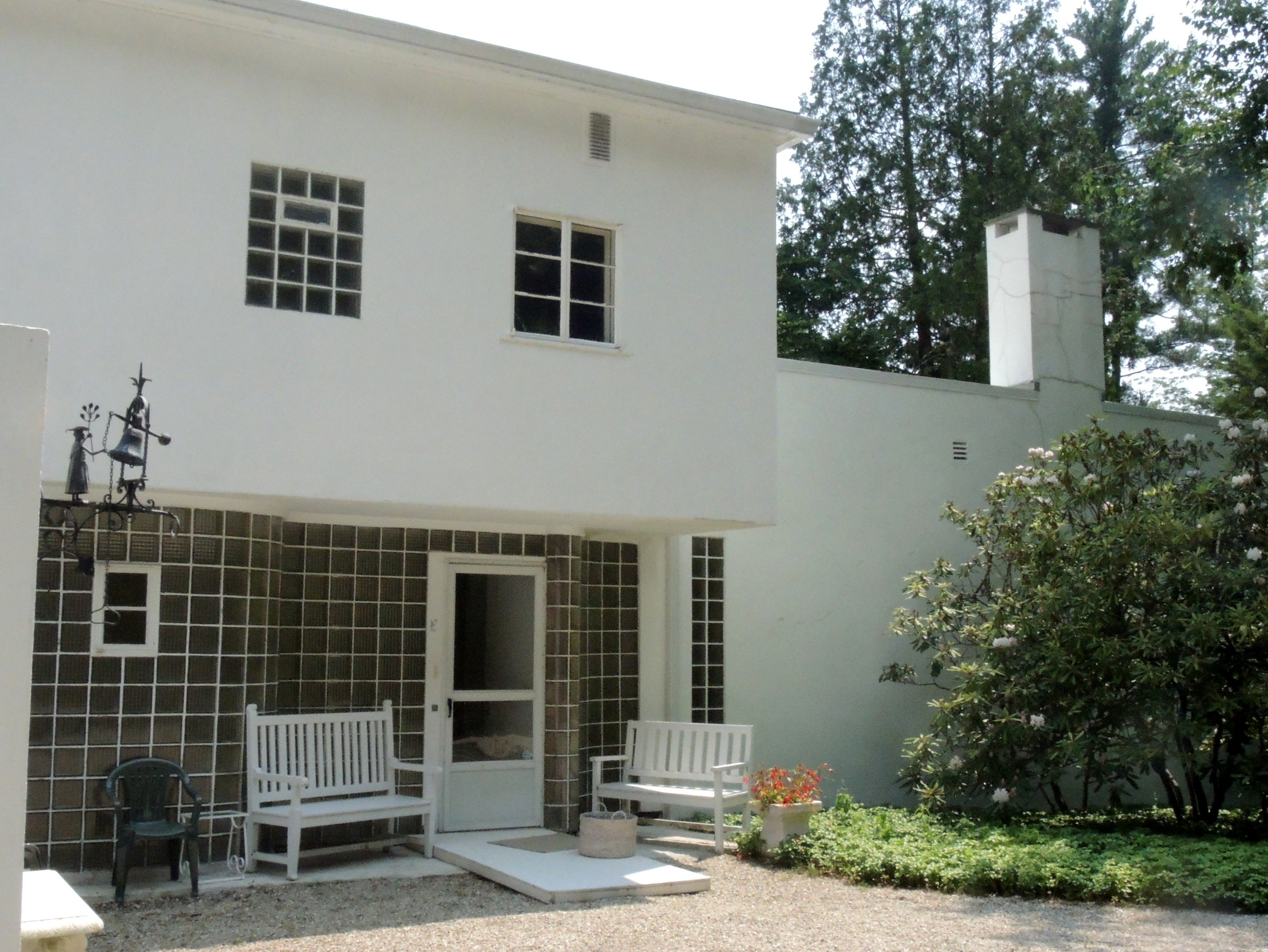

- Location within Massachusetts Location within the United States
- Location: 92 Hawthorne Street, Stockbridge, Massachusetts; 159 West Street, Lenox, Massachusetts
- Coordinates: 42°20′56″N 73°17′59″W
- Area: 46 acres (19 ha)
- Built: 1930 (studio); 1941 (house)
- Architectural style: Bauhaus
- Website: www.frelinghuysen.org
- NRHP reference No.: 16000304
- Added to NRHP: May 31, 2016

The Frelinghuysen Morris House and Studio is a historic house museum and former art studio in Lenox and Stockbridge, Massachusetts. The house and studio were home to American Abstract Artists George L.K. Morris and Suzy Frelinghuysen. The studio was built in Bauhaus style in 1930 by Morris and his friend George Sanderson. The house was added in 1941, designed by John Butler Swann. The house and studio were entered onto the National Register of Historic Places in 2016.

The house contains furnishings and decorations unchanged since the couple's lifetime. The art collection includes cubist frescoes and paintings by Morris and Frelinghuysen, as well as works by Pablo Picasso, Juan Gris, Georges Braque, Joan Miró and Henri Matisse.

== Property history ==
The property was part of a larger agricultural property until 1885, when it was developed as a country estate called Brookhurst by William Bainbridge Shattuck of New York City. Shattuck hired architect James Renwick Jr., whose well-known commissions include the Smithsonian Castle in Washington, D.C. The main house burned down in 1908, leaving only a number of Renwick-designed outbuildings. The estate was then purchased by Newbold Morris (the son of Augustus Newbold Morris), who hired Francis L. V. Hoppin and Terence Koen (who had also done work on Edith Wharton's The Mount) to design a grand Colonial Revival mansion house. One of the outbuildings from this period was converted into a guesthouse by Frelinghuysen and Morris.

Upon the death of Helen Morris in 1956, the estate was divided into three portions. The westernmost element, which includes some of the Brookhurst outbuildings, was inherited by George Morris. He had hired George Sanderson, a college classmate, to design the Modernist studio which was completed in 1930, taking inspiration from the groundbreaking work of Le Corbusier. The studio is one of the oldest Modernist buildings in the state. The house was added in 1941, after Morris and Frelinghuysen married, as an adjunct to the studio space, and is considered an early example of Mid-Century Modern architecture. Morris died in 1975, and Frelinghuysen in 1988. After her death, a non-profit foundation was established to preserve the property as a museum.

== See also ==
- National Register of Historic Places listings in Berkshire County, Massachusetts
- Historic Artists' Homes and Studios
