= Florida Territory's at-large congressional district =

Former congressional district

Coordinates: 30°N 83°W

- Obsolete district
- Created: 1822, as a non-voting delegate was granted by Congress
- Eliminated: 1845, as a result of statehood
- Years active: 1822–1845

Florida Territory was created on March 30, 1822, and was represented by a non-voting delegate to the United States House of Representatives until statehood was achieved on March 3, 1845. The territory's first delegate, Joseph Marion Hernández, was elected on September 30, 1822, and took his seat in Congress on January 23, 1823.

== List of delegates representing the district ==
Delegate (Residence)	Party	Years	Cong ress	Electoral history
District created March 30, 1822
Vacant		March 30, 1822 – January 23, 1823	17th	
Joseph M. Hernández (Saint Augustine)	Democratic-Republican	January 23, 1823 – March 3, 1823	17th	Elected in 1822. Lost re-election.
Richard K. Call (Pensacola)	Democratic-Republican	March 4, 1823 – March 3, 1825	18th	Elected in 1823. Retired.
Joseph M. White (Monticello)	Jacksonian	March 4, 1825 – March 3, 1837	19th 20th 21st 22nd 23rd 24th	Elected in 1824.Re-elected in 1826. Re-elected in 1828. Re-elected in 1830. Re-elected in 1832. Re-elected in 1834. Lost re-election.
Charles Downing (Saint Augustine)	Democratic	March 4, 1837 – March 3, 1841	25th 26th	Elected in 1836. Re-elected in 1838. Retired.
David Levy Yulee (Saint Augustine)	Democratic	March 4, 1841 – March 3, 1845	27th 28th	Elected in 1840. Elected in 1842. Elected as a U.S. Senator upon statehood.
District eliminated March 3, 1845
