= United States Housing Corporation Historic District (New London, Connecticut) =

Historic district in Connecticut, United States

- U.S. National Register of Historic Places
- U.S. Historic district
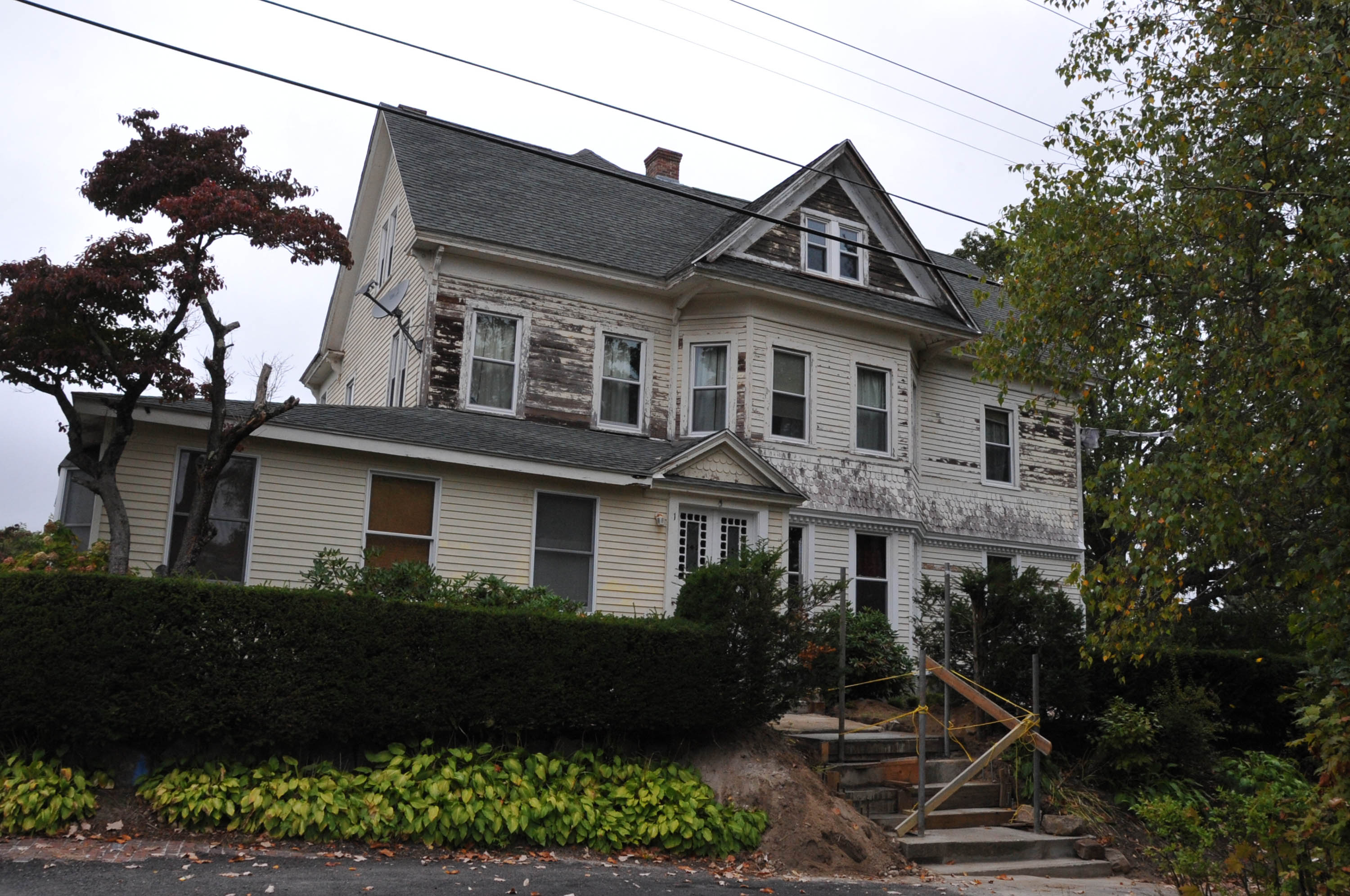

- Location within Connecticut Location within the United States
- Location: Roughly bounded by Colman, Fuller, and West Pleasant Streets, and Jefferson Avenue, New London, Connecticut
- Coordinates: 41°21′17″N 72°6′49″W
- Area: 20 acres (8.1 ha)
- Built: 1919
- Architect: Hoppin & Koen
- Architectural style: Colonial Revival, Queen Anne
- NRHP reference No.: 90000603
- Added to NRHP: April 16, 1990

The United States Housing Corporation Historic District is a residential historic district located on the west side of New London, Connecticut. It contains a relatively uniform collection of Colonial Revival houses, most of them built in 1919 and 1920 by the United States Housing Corporation, a United States federal government agency founded to provide housing for workers in strategically significant war-related industries. The development of this district was overseen by the noted landscape architect Frederick Law Olmsted Jr. The district is bounded on the west by Colman Avenue, the south by West Pleasant Street, the east by Jefferson Street, and on the north by Fuller Street. The district was listed on the National Register of Historic Places on April 16, 1990.

== Description and history ==
The United States Housing Corporation development was approved in 1918, and construction began around the same time that the armistice ending World War I in Europe was signed. The corporation plan called for the construction of 64 buildings, either single family or semi-detached two-family buildings. These were largely completed in 1919, and were sold off by 1921. The corporation had originally planned to build more buildings on the available lots, but these plans ended with the war. Remaining house lots were sold off in the 1920s to other builders. The houses that were built by the corporation exhibit a uniformity of Colonial Revival design, varied by altering details of trim, roofline, and setting. Most of the houses built later borrow in some way from the vocabulary established by the corporation's designs, and were constrained in their size and setting by deed restrictions.

== See also ==
- National Register of Historic Places listings in New London County, Connecticut
