= Moses Bixby =

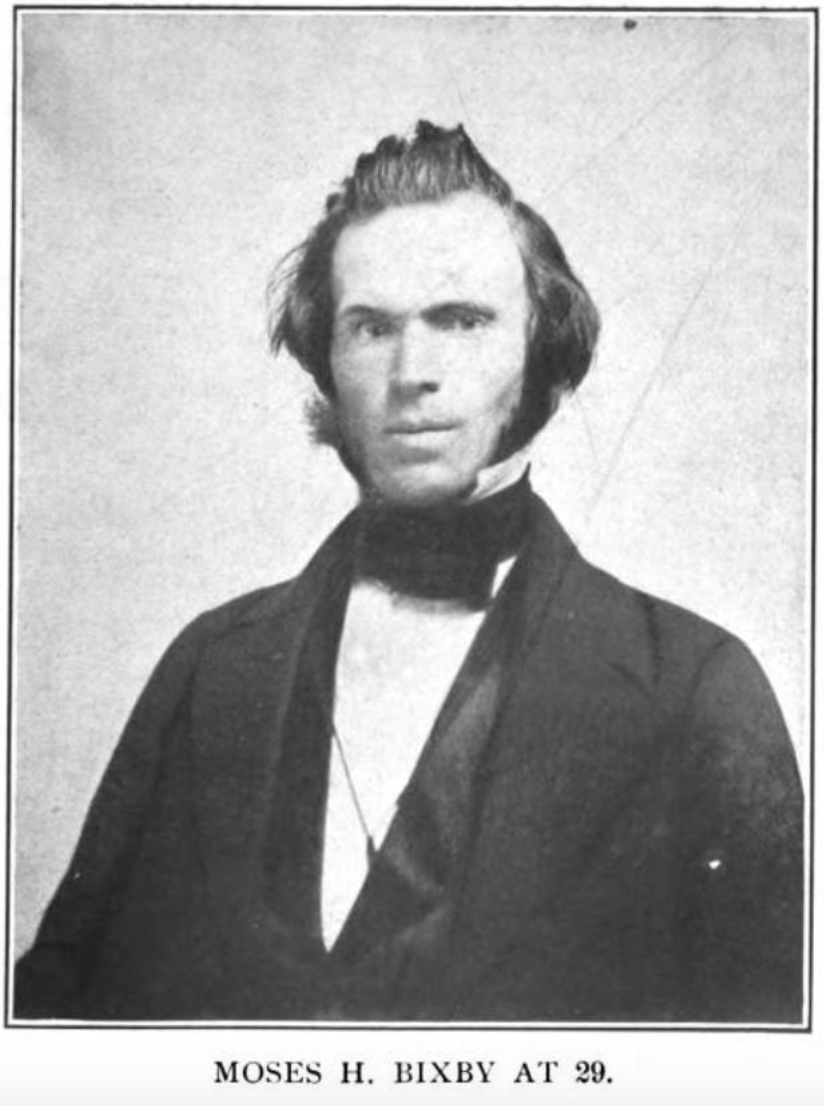
Moses Bixby, c. 1856

Moses Bixby (1827–1901) was an American Christian missionary to Burma and founder of the Friendship Street Baptist Church in Providence, Rhode Island and The Old Buttonwoods summer colony.

Moses Homans Bixby was born in Warren, New Hampshire in 1827 to Benjamin and Mary Cleasby Bixby, a family of British ancestry. He and all seven of his brothers became Christian ministers, and he became a Methodist at age twelve and then studied to become a minister at Newbury Seminary, and the Biblical Institute, now known as Boston University, as the youngest theological student there. After serving several churches he eventually became a Baptist and joined a Baptist church in East Hardwick, Vermont and attended Derby Seminary and then Montreal's Baptist College. After preaching in Vermont for a period, he was chosen to be a missionary to Burma, to which he sailed in 1853. He successfully preached around Burma, until his wife and child became ill and he returned to Rhode Island. After pastoring Friendship Street Baptist Church for three years, he returned to Burma and opened a new church for the Shan people in 1861. He suffered from illness related to his travels in Burma for ten years. In 1869 he returned to Rhode Island and founded the Cranston street Baptist Church in Providence in 1870. He also worked to establish The Old Buttonwoods section of Warwick was founded as a summer colony in 1871 similar to the Methodist Camp Ground in Oak Bluffs on Martha's Vineyard. He died in 1901.
