= Mala Compra Plantation Archeological Site =

Archaeological site in Florida, United States

- U.S. National Register of Historic Places
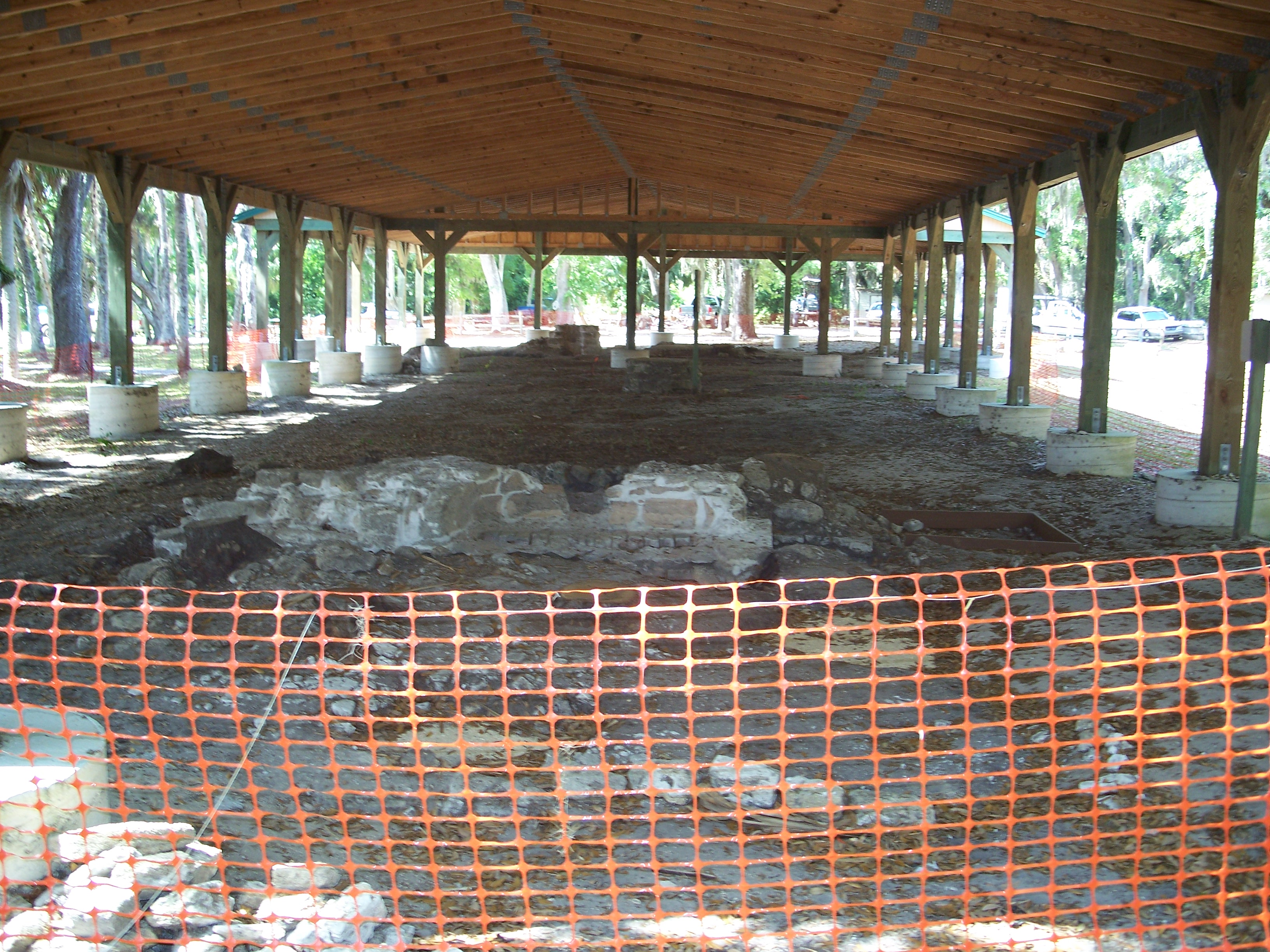
- Mala Compra excavation site
- Location: Palm Coast, Florida
- Coordinates: 29°36′58″N 81°12′12″W
- Area: less than one acre
- NRHP reference No.: 04000142
- Added to NRHP: March 5, 2004

The Mala Compra Plantation Archeological Site is an archaeological site in Palm Coast, Florida, on the east bank of the Matanzas River. It is located west of the intersection of State Road A1A and Mala Compra Drive at Bings Landing County Park in Flagler County. On March 5, 2004, it was added to the United States National Register of Historic Places.

Mala Compra (Spanish for "bad bargain" or "bad purchase") was formerly part of one of northeastern Florida's largest plantation systems (totaling 2,265 acres). Situated on the coast, it belonged to Joseph Marion Hernández (1788–1857), and was worked primarily as a slave-based cotton plantation from 1816 through 1836, when the Seminoles burned it down near the beginning of the Second Seminole War.

Preliminary archaeological investigations were conducted at the Mala Compra site in 1999. The study identified the house where Hernández and his family resided when they were not at their home in St. Augustine, and the detached kitchen was also found. The land for the plantation was purchased by Hernández in 1816; cotton and corn were grown there until the settlement was destroyed by marauding Native Americans.

The main dwelling-house was described in historical accounts as a 1 1/2-story framed structure with a masonry foundation. Investigations revealed that the building had a coquina block foundation in the eastern part while masonry footers supported the western section. It was almost twice the size of the dimensions cited in the historical descriptions. Wooden floors had been described as well, and traces of them were found, but tabby concrete surfaces were also identified.

An account of the state of the plantation in 1836 given by Joseph S. Sanchez to the County Court of St. Johns County in 1837 says that his militia troops found a number of oxen, cattle, and horses; garden enclosures and cattle pens; and "an extensive and thriving sweet orange grove, said to contain 1,500 trees, and a variety of other fruit trees...".

Over 14,000 artifacts were recovered by archaeologists and their assistants, including fragments of ceramics and wine bottles, kitchen utensils, kaolin pipes, hinges, nails, and gun parts. The main house and kitchen have been interpreted to provide an interactive historical exhibit for public education and recreation, and plans developed for additional research and preservation of the valuable cultural resources.

== History ==
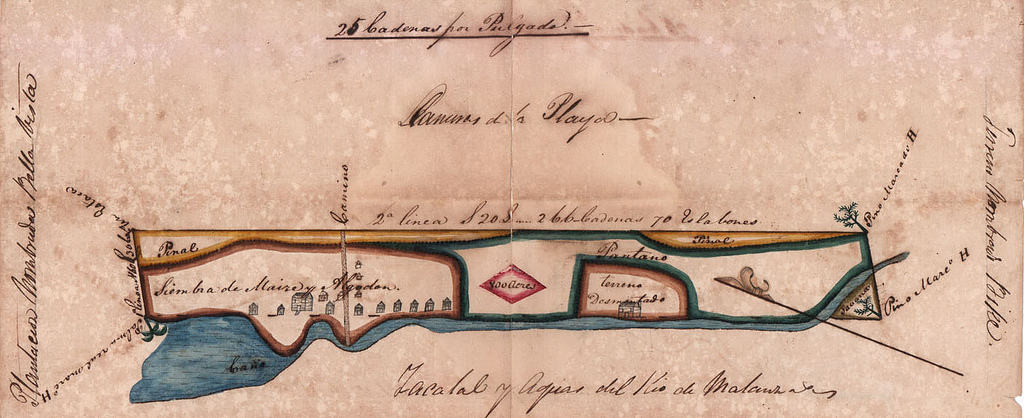
Map of Spanish Land Grant to Joseph M. Hernandez showing Mala Compra

In 1816, the Spanish government granted Hernández a large tract of land at the confluence of Graham's Swamp and what was then the headwaters of the southern end of the Matanzas River, on its western bank. There he cultivated about 700 acres of sugarcane, calling the place St. Joseph plantation. According to a deed dated March 11, 1816, for 1,500 pesos in cash Father Miguel Crosby sold Hernández 800 acres on the coastal barrier island, described as "800 acres with its adjoining marshes on the Matanzas River, bounded on the north by lands of John Bautista Ferreyra". The name "Mala Compra" had been given previously to the property by another owner. In 1818, Hernández bought from Ferreyra's son, Francis Ferreira (spelling of these names varied, often in the same document), another property of 375 acres adjoining Mala Compra called Bella Vista. Ferreira was a sea captain who trafficked enslaved African people in Florida. The soil of the cotton fields at Mala Compra was said to have been as white and sandy after some years as the Atlantic beach, yet still produced abundant crops of Sea Island cotton. This was high hammock land where the original growth was almost exclusively southern live oak.

Hernández' country residence was the plantation house at Mala Compra, a 1 1/2-story frame structure built on a coquina block foundation measuring 18 by 30 feet and laid three feet deep; the side facing the river had a long, wide porch. The interior of the house had two fireplaces built of brick and coquina, plastered walls and paneled doors. The detached kitchen was also 18 by 30 feet, it had a terraced first floor and a loft used for curing tobacco. There was a wooden-framed warehouse for cotton on the property that could hold 200,000 pounds of seed and 200 bales of ginned cotton. Agricultural equipment included single- and double-horse gins and 24-foot-gins, in which the horses trod a path 24 feet in circumference. There were other buildings including a corn crib, a driver's house, and a privy, as well as cabins for people enslaved as forced laborers.

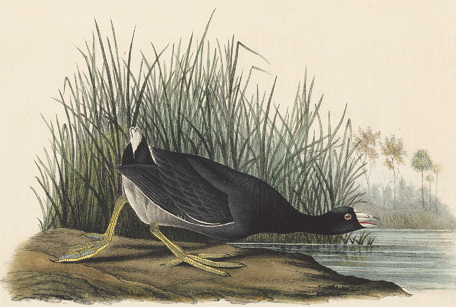
The American Coot from The Birds of America. Plate CCCV — Male.

Hernández was Florida's first delegate to the U.S. Congress in 1822 and 1823 and the first Hispanic to serve in the United States Congress. He was a brigadier general commanding troops of the Florida Militia during the Second Seminole War, who while negotiating with Seminole leader Osceola under a white flag of truce in October 1837, took him captive by order of General Jesup.

It was from Mala Compra that Hernandez wrote a letter to Dr. William H. Simmons, dated April 15, 1830, on the cultivation of Cuban tobacco. Simmons and John Lee Williams of Pensacola were commissioned by the second Territorial Council of Florida to select a central point between St. Augustine and Pensacola to serve as capital of the territory in 1823. In 1831, John James Audubon spent ten days as a guest of Hernández at Mala Compra. There he shot dozens of American coots, one of which was a male from which he drew the figure for the plate which appeared in his book The Birds of America.

In 1832 the Legislative Council of the Territory of Florida incorporated a company to dig a canal from the head of Matanzas Lagoon to Smith's Creek, a tributary of the Halifax River. With this act a memorial was presented to Congress seeking financial assistance and land grants; subsequently five sections were appropriated for the proposed canal. The company intended to commence the canal at Mala Compra plantation and dig it southward a distance of about 11 or 12 miles through a rich wet savanna, parallel with the coast, to Smith's Creek, about four miles north of John Bulow's plantation.

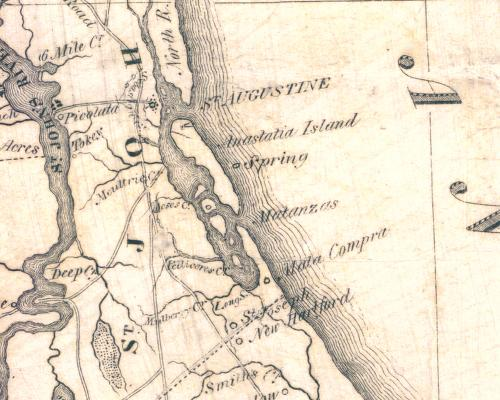
J. Lee Williams map of 1837, showing location of Mala Compra

In the early stages of the Second Seminole War, during the winter of 1835 and 1836, and in the spring of the latter year, both Mala Compra and St. Joseph plantations were taken into military possession by the United States, and the houses occupied and fortified as military posts. During that winter and spring, both places were occupied, evacuated, and reoccupied by various detachments and bodies of troops. The troops seized and ate the large quantities of corn, hay, sugarcane, and cattle stored on the farm.

In the spring, the Seminoles, taking advantage of a temporary evacuation, burned all the buildings of any consequence or value on the sugarcane plantation. At Mala Compra, they burned the cotton warehouse that had been prepared and used as a defensive fortification. They captured three of the 80 people enslaved on the plantation and drove the rest off.
