= Buttonwoods Beach Historic District =

Historic district in Rhode Island, United States

- Buttonwood Beach Historic District
- U.S. National Register of Historic Places
- U.S. Historic district
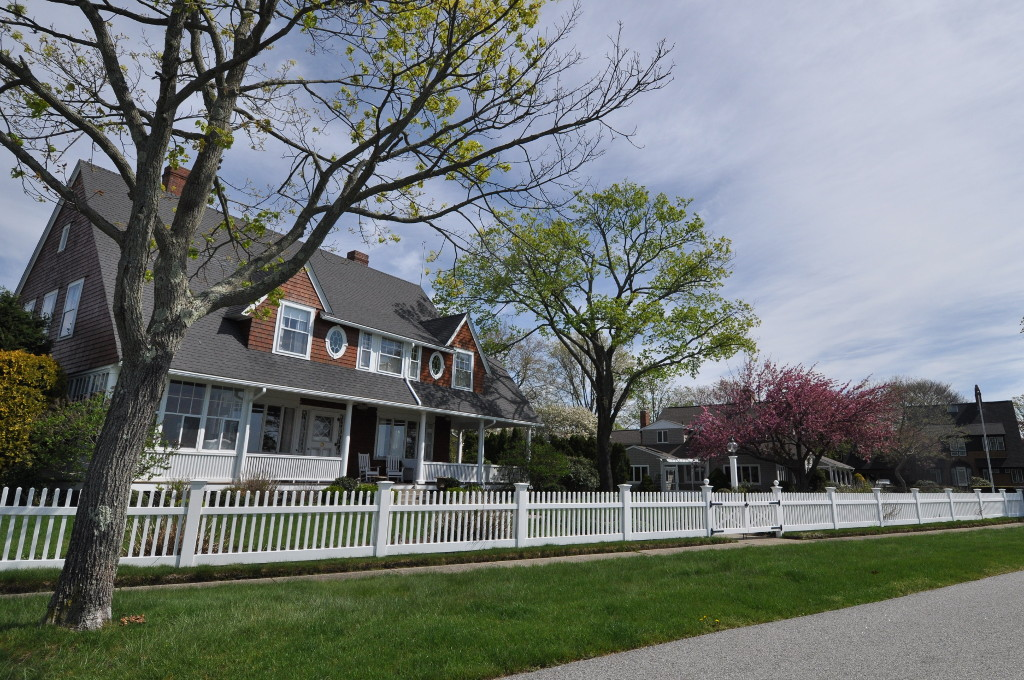

- Location within Rhode Island Location within the United States
- Location: Warwick, Rhode Island
- Coordinates: 41°41′04″N 71°24′42″W
- Architect: Multiple
- Architectural style: Late 19th And 20th Century Revivals, Late Victorian
- MPS: Warwick MRA
- NRHP reference No.: 84001834
- Added to NRHP: February 23, 1984

Buttonwood Beach Historic District is a historic district bounded by Brush Neck Cove, Greenwich Bay, Cooper and Promenade Avenues in Warwick, Rhode Island. Buttonwood Beach is a bucolic neighborhood on the eastern limb of the Nausauket neck, located in the West Bay area of Warwick, Rhode Island. Buttonwoods is delimited by Nausauket and Apponaug to the west, Buttonwoods Cove to the north, Greenwich (aka Cowesett) Bay to the south and Oakland Beach to the east. Buttonwood Beach was founded as a summer colony in 1871 by the Rev. Moses Bixby of Providence's Cranston Street Baptist Church, who was looking for a place to establish a summer colony by the shore for his congregation. He envisioned a community that would be similar to Oak Bluffs on Martha's Vineyard, where the Methodists established a summer campground in 1835. Today, this coastal neighborhood on Greenwich Bay is home to people from many different religious backgrounds.

The district was added to the National Register of Historic Places in 1984.

== History ==
For the first 230 years after the purchase of Central Rhode Island from Sachem Miantonomi by Samuel Gorton and his followers, Buttonwoods was made up of a few farms settled by the Budlong and Greene families along with some American Indian families. Budlong and Greene settled there around 1700 after the end of King Phillip's War. The still existing Budlong and Greene homes are among the oldest homes still standing in Warwick. Although the Warwick settlement on Warwick Cove is 60 years older, the early homes there no longer stand.

By the 1830s the Greenes supported the efforts of the Kinnecom family, American Indian residents living by the beach, to open Buttonwoods Beach as a clambake and beach destination for the public. There are no traces left of the Kinnecom wigwam. Their 1800s farm and graveyard located on the Warwick Plain made up part of the T.F. Green Airport.

The 1779 British Royal Navy Navigational Chart surveyed by Col. Joseph Frederick Wallet Des Barres includes these ancient houses as well as Buttonwoods Avenue, the highway that connects these settlements to the East Greenwich town center. One of the houses is across from the Buttonwoods Casino. Another is near the Buttonwoods Gate. This map also shows the Warwick settlement on Warwick Cove. The map shows the original colonial road to Buttonwoods now named Buttonwoods Avenue.

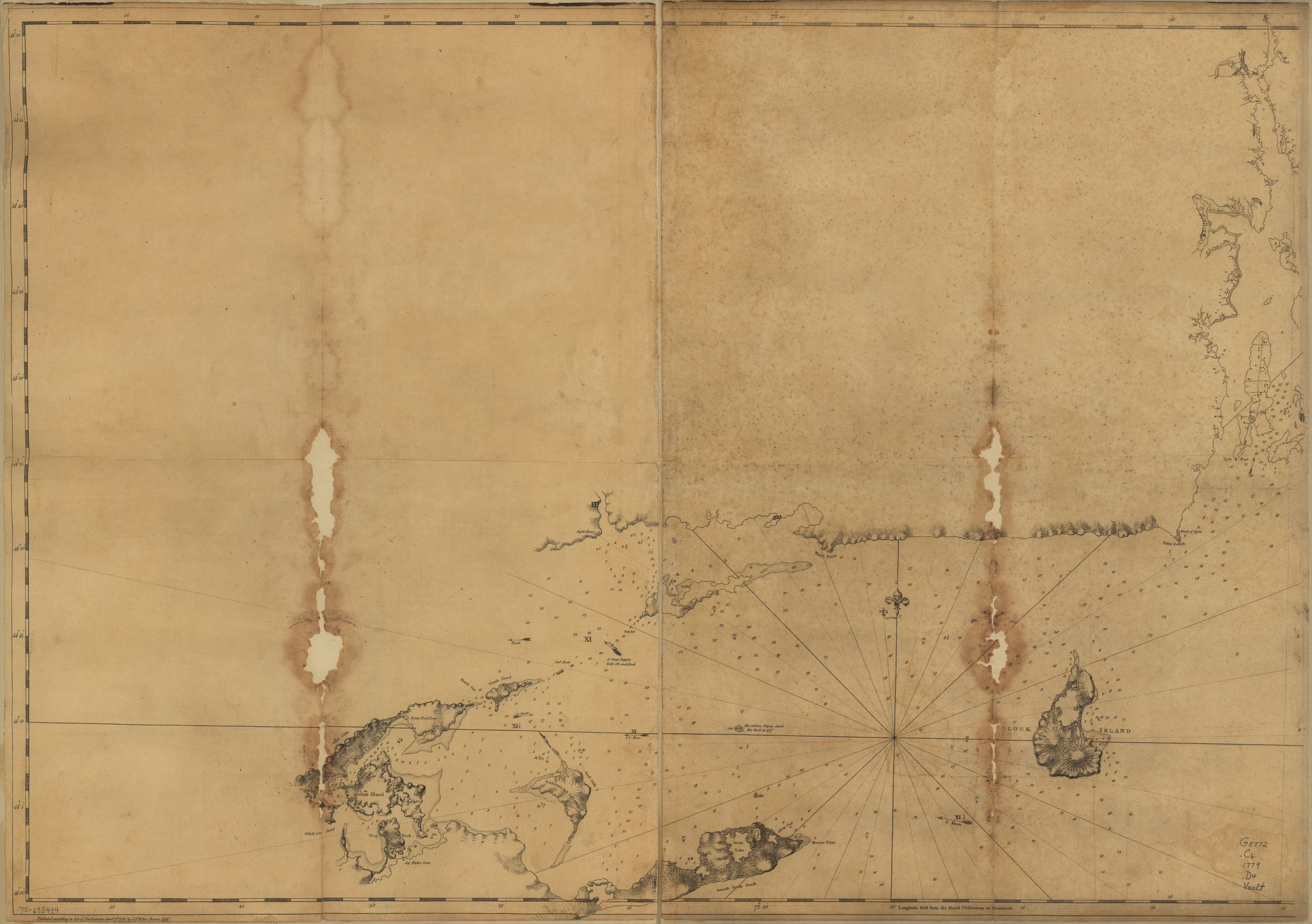
1779 British Royal Navy Navigational Chart

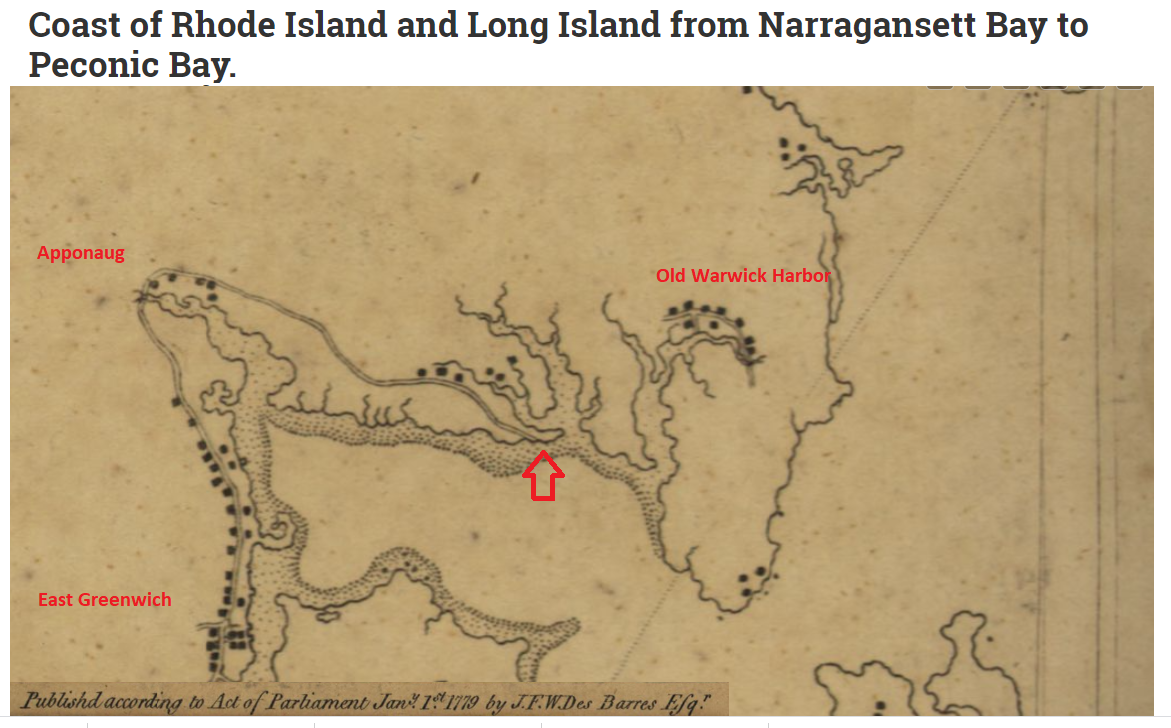
Buttonwoods Avenue

The organizer of what the original residents of the Historic District called Buttonwoods Proper, Rev. Moses Bixby, spent ten years as a Christian missionary in Burma and Siam. He founded the First Shan Church in Toungoo, Burma in 1862 among the Tai people there (the Shan). This church has survived until modern times and is doing well. As of 2009, there are currently 92 Shan churches attributed to his efforts to build the First Missionary To The Shan Of Burma

Bixby and his fellow missionaries met with the King of Siam in 1862 and obtained his blessing to teach English to the Shan living in that kingdom. This was the year that Anna Leonowens was introduced to the king and became his Royal governess and English teacher. Local folklore attributes Bixby to have been the facilitator of that engagement documented in the book called Anna and The King of Siam.

Missionary records show that Mr. Bixby's assistant was Miss A. R. (Anna) Gage, Bixby's wife's sister. She stayed in Burma and founded a girls school there in 1873 to teach the Burmese girls the English language. Anna Gage stayed in Burma for many years giving Moses Bixby a family connection to his former mission.

When Bixby arrived in Cranston in 1870, he linked up with Lodowick Brayton. Brayton was a successful industrialist and investor who bought the old Friends (Quaker) Meeting House, said to be the first church in Cranston, in 1866. He set up a Sunday school in the building. This was also the location of the first May Breakfast in Rhode Island established one year later by Mrs. Ruby King to raise money for a new church. Jeannie Bixby Johnson, Silver Burdett and Company, 1904, shows that Bixby founded the Cranston Street Baptist Church in November, 1870, upon his return from Burma. Bixby expanded Brayton's Sunday school into a church of 50 or so members and relocated to Cranston Street. Within a year, three investors acting as trustees, Lodowick Brayton, The Rev. Jonathan Brayton, and Andrew Comstock purchased the Buttonwoods campground in Warwick for $10,000. An early plat of the campgrounds shows the laying out of 1,026 lots on 420 acres (170 ha) of land and a large tabernacle. According to the cartographer, this map "is advertising the sale of lots in Section No. 3." Rhode Island Historical Society, Call# Map 1393-1394, 1872-1873.

In A Walking Tour of Buttonwoods Beach, written by Robert O. Jones of the Rhode Island Historical Preservation and Heritage Commission, he reports that the "shore bordering the Greene Farms at Nassauket (actually Baker's Creek) became a popular destination for excursions. Travelers came by steamboat or by wagon overland from the Apponaug train depot.

The western boundary of the site is a road, now called Andrew Comstock Road, that may have been used since colonial times by the James Greene Family from their house described as one of Warwick's oldest houses, the road running southerly down to the bay and the site of a landing hooking up this section of Warwick with Potowomut where several other members of the extended Greene family lived. Another colonial road, now called Buttonwoods Avenue, ran easterly from the James Greene house to other Greene property in Old Buttonwoods.

In the 1830s the Kinnecom family, a group registered with the Narragansett Indian Tribe, started to hold clambakes on the Greene property, the earliest-known effort to make a commercial success of what had been a long-standing Rhode Island social and culinary tradition. The vicinity was also a favored place for church outings. William Henry Harrison held a political rally here during his historic presidential campaign. The Kinnecom family hosted over 10,000 people for this event. The area was first called Buttonwoods at this time, named for the many buttonwood trees that once grew here."

This site remained popular with the public by people taking trolleys from Providence until 1936 or driving in from Apponaug and paying daily fees to enjoy the beach.

Just how popular the Buttonwoods destination was for the public in the 1880s is made clear in a representation to the Warwick Town Council by John G. Bissell and others regarding the "Road used by Buttonwood Beach Ass'n for Horse railroad" on October 18, 1881. Apparently this railroad was being torn up at that time. Bissell and others quitclaimed their interest in this road so that it might continue to be "used by thousands for a carriage road." Even in the old days there were traffic jams on the roads to the shore, it seems.

The plan for the Buttonwoods site now located at the Rhode Island Historical Society in Providence called for 1,000 or so land parcels to be sold to Baptists from around the region. Lodowick joined with his brother Jonathan and with Andrew Comstock to secure the $10,000 in financing for this enterprise. This would be the equivalent of hundreds of millions in today's dollars, a large real estate development. Much of the cash investment came from the Brayton family (railroaders and steel dealers and investor in the Colvin loom. The Panic of 1873 set in shortly after this investment was made and few lots were actually sold for many years. The campgrounds were resurveyed in 1882 into much larger lots, many of remained unsold and were combined into a large tract of open space in recent years. Brayton died a rich man but his fortunes were much diminished in the real estate deflation that followed the panic.

Andrew Comstock, a beef shipper and merchant in Providence and founder of the Hammond Beef and Provision Company of Hammond, Indiana, Chicago and Omaha was the other significant investor. He remained a very rich man throughout his life. His Providence operation was located at a rail siding in what is now the Roger Williams National Memorial Park where the original Providence colony was established. The Hammond Beef companies along with several refrigerator rail car companies along with Armour and Company, Gustavus Swift, and Morris Beef Company were the subject of the "Beef Trust" trial of 1910.

The main interest of these partners was to develop a rail link from Providence to the shore, with Buttonwoods as the terminus. First a horse railway was established from Apponaug to the Hill farm and then steam trains were introduced from Auburn, RI. This then became the Suburban Railroad servicing Rocky Point, Oakland Beach, and Buttonwoods. This ended in 1936 and the bridge was dismantled and the timbers were given to the BBA for the future use of bulkheads on the water front.

In the early 1900s there was great interest in Warwick to illuminate the streets with Narragansett Electric provided street lighting paid for by the town through tax revenues. In 1903 the Buttonwood Beach Association petitioned the Town Council to provide such street lighting. The Town Council approved this petition on June 22, 1903 completing the Beach Association's dedication of the streets in Old Buttonwoods for the public and making them public highways in the Town of Warwick.

The Providence Journal reports that the Town Council reported on November 22, 1909 that the Buttonwood Beach Association had agreed to pay for the streetlighting at Buttonwoods. That promise has been lost to history. The City of Warwick pays for streetlighting at Buttonwoods.

In 1922, it's textile mills were temporarily shutdown by the New England Textile Strike over an attempted wage cut and hours increase. In March of 2020, a home in Buttonwoods was featured on the HGTV series "Beach Hunters" episode "Ocean State Forever Home" (Season 7, Episode 3).

== Description ==
This residential neighborhood is small, about 170 houses, and most of the houses are historic, with many Victorian cottages and larger shingled bungalows in the Arts and Crafts style. The waterfront along Promenade Avenue has many mature trees in their streets. Many of the original cottages have disappeared over the years, including the cottage at Buttonwoods Point, torn down in the 1980s, and the Moses Bixby cottage, which, except for the roof peak on the West side, was torn down during the real estate boom of the 2000s. These were two of the original cottages at the beach of seemingly historic value.

The above-mentioned A Walking Tour of Buttonwoods Beach, written by Robert O. Jones, documents a few original cottages that survive to this day including the Smith S. Sweet house at 1078 Buttonwoods Avenue and a cottage at 12 12th Avenue which was also in the Sweet family. A cottage at 5 13th Avenue, across from the location of the original Moses Bixby house, built in 1872, was also leveled during the real estate boom of the 2000s upon the death of the former owner who had lived there for much of the 20th Century.

Across Buttonwoods Cove, although not part of Old Buttonwoods, is Warwick City Park, which includes three baseball fields, picnic areas and shelters, three miles (5 km) of paved bicycle paths, and tennis courts among other amenities.

Abutting Old Buttonwoods directly to the west is Budlong Farm, on which land is located the summer colony of the Buttonwoods Campers Association, established around the turn of the 20th century. The Budlong/Greene families were among the original colonists and founders of Warwick, Rhode Island, along with the Gorton, Lippitt and Potter families et al. The Greenes owned a huge portion of the Nausauket neck, which was divided up among the generations of Budlong/Greene heirs.

The original Greene/Budlong farm homestead, built in 1776, still stands today and can be seen from Buttonwoods Avenue. Over time, tracts of land were sold off, among them, the tract sold to the Buttonwoods Beach Association (see above, purchase of land by Lodowick Brayton, The Rev. Jonathan Brayton, and Andrew Comstock). When Henry Warner Budlong inherited what remained of the Greene family lands, he was approached to establish a summer colony similar to that of Buttonwoods Beach, but dedicated to middle-class families.

At that time the Buttonwoods Campgrounds was established (circa 1899) allowing families to erect long tents (said to have been army surplus from the Civil War) and spend summers on the shore of Greenwich Bay. Henry Warner Budlong, whose memorial building sits next to Warwick City Hall in Apponaug, was a bachelor with no heirs. In his last will and testament, Budlong bequeathed the majority of his material assets to his housekeeper, Emily I. Hohler. The Buttonwoods Campers Association, currently consisting of 120 cottages, continued uninterrupted to lease the land. Budlong's will drawn up in 1928 (he died in 1929) specified that upon Mrs. Hohler's passing, the Budlong Farm land would not pass to her heirs, but would go to the Metropolitan Park Commission of the State of RI to be made into a memorial park named The Greene Park after his mother, Rhody Knight Greene.

When Mrs. Hohler died October 31, 1964, the Hohler daughters, Alice Hohler and Hope Maynard joined with the summer resident "campers" to contest the Budlong will. One camper, William McCaughey Jr., was key in obtaining a stay of the state's possession by then-governor John Chafee, who said the campers could remain on the contested land until a solution had been reached. The Hohler/Maynard families, with financial support from the summer residents, purchased an identical tract of waterfront land which was given to the state (and then the City of Warwick) to satisfy the Budlong will. That land was added to other land the City of Warwick owned, and became Warwick City Park.

== Buttonwood Beach Association ==
The Buttonwood Beach Association was incorporated in July 1872 by a special act of the Rhode Island General Assembly. The following is the general description of this charter:

- Business Form: Corporation
- Ownership/Membership: Stockholders (Buttonwoods property owners with a two-year residency requirement). Stock cannot be sold by shareholders but may be sold back to the Association.
- Function: To establish a "summer resort" and of buying, selling, using, improving, and managing real and personal estate for such purpose in connection therewith. Most but not all property in Buttonwoods has specific deed restrictions, among which is that prior to sale, all property must be first offered to the Association. (This is generally considered to be a restriction on "who" may live in the Buttonwoods Fire District. Some owners upon selling, have refused to carry that arcane stipulation forward.)
- Purpose: Originally founded to acquire and develop land for a summer resort, today the BBA claims the ownership of the platted streets although that claim is contrary to statutory law which grants the ownership of the streets to the abutters. In some cases, the BBA is the abutter because it owns various undeveloped lots throughout the neighborhood, and it provides oversight in preserving those properties to the benefit of all residents. The BBA dedicated these streets to the public in its 1882 plat map filed with the Warwick Town Clerk. This was a mortgage deed requirement of the original lender to secure his interest that the lots could be marketed after a potential foreclosure.

The Buttonwood Beach Association now organizes activities and celebrations for residents, many held at the Buttonwooods Fire District-owned building called the Casino. The Casino has a stage and two bowling alleys. Tennis courts and a playground are nearby. Potluck dinners, seasonal parties, and arts and crafts lessons for children take place there. Fire District residents and others can use the hall for private parties. The Buttonwood Beach Association built a nondenominational chapel at Ninth Avenue and Janice Road.

== Buttonwoods Fire District ==
The Buttonwoods Fire District was incorporated in January 1925 by the Rhode Island General Assembly. The following is the general description of this charter:

- Business Form: Municipal government. The Fire District is not an entity of the City of Warwick but rather the General Assembly. It reports annually to the General Assembly.
- Ownership/Membership: Every owner of taxable property in Buttonwoods is an elector (entitled to vote). The Rhode Island Supreme Court has ruled that all residents of fire districts who are registered to vote in the State of Rhode Island are fire district electors. Tenants and children of owners who live in the Buttonwoods Fire District are eligible to vote. This is an important point because limited liability companies are buying up property in the district. Many properties are controlled by trusts. If actual property ownership were the requirement for being an elector, this requirement would be unconstitutional at both the federal and state levels. See Flynn v. King (and West Glocester Fire District.)
- Function: To maintain the public streets, parks, and seawalls of the Fire District using tax appropriations. Some residents have long claimed that these streets are private because the taxpayers in the Fire District pay "special taxes" to keep them private, but that is contrary to case law. See Kilmartin v. Barbuto, a 2017 Misquamicut Beach case that describes the public use of streets and ways to the shore. The Fire District also uses these taxes to pay for the maintenance of recreational facilities in the area such as the Casino, the tennis and pickleball courts, and the woodland trails that are not part of the platted parks. These facilities, unlike the streets and parks, are for resident use only. The Fire District also maintains the storm drains in the area subject to the supervision of the R.I. DEM and has been requested by the DEM to file a maintenance plan with that agency. (The City of Warwick and the RI Department of Transportation are under court orders to maintain their storm drains under DEM supervision at considerable expense to these entities.)

(Although the Buttonwood Beach Association claims ownership of the streets in the Fire District, the Fire District has used Federal Stafford Act funds to maintain the streets and that act requires that the streets be controlled by governments and open to the public or by certain non-profits. The Buttonwood Beach Association is a corporation and body politic and is not a non-profit. It does not fall under the Stafford Act. The Beach Association dedicated these streets for public use in 1882 and the Buttonwoods Fire District has accepted that dedication in its bylaws making the streets public. See Newport Realty v. Lynch (2005) and Warwick Sewer Authority v. Carlone (2012)) The Rhode Island Supreme Court held in 2020 in Clark v. Buttonwoods Beach Association that the streets are public. This was after the Beach Association had filed a motion in Superior Court defending Promenade Avenue against Clark's claim of adverse possession pointing out that the streets are public under the "King's Rights" doctrine.)

Today, the Buttonwoods Campers Association, Inc. continues to lease lands (about 25 acres) from the Hohler/Maynard families. The association members have a community hall where various social functions and activities are held for the benefit of residents of all ages. The association has made capital improvements, including a basketball court, soft sand volleyball court, bocce court and playground. Despite considerable erosion of its once pristine beach (due directly to the Stafford Act FEMA-financed construction of a massive seawall to protect Old Buttonwoods' shoreline) the summer community continues to be populated by families with youngsters and by snowbird seniors. The entire Budlong Farm sits on about 60 acres. A good portion is used to grow corn by Confreda Farms. Recently, the land was put under the Rhode Island Farm, Forest, and Open Space Act, with a pledge not to be developed. It remains a bucolic snapshot of colonial times and of the late Victorian era.

== See also ==
- National Register of Historic Places listings in Warwick, Rhode Island
