= Fort Vinton =

Coordinates: 27.5972°N 80.6022°W

Fort Vinton, also known as "Post #2", was a small U.S. Army outpost that existed from 1839 to 1858. Location of the fort is approximately a mile south of highway 60 near 122nd Avenue.

== History ==
The fort was constructed during the Second Seminole War in support of Colonel Zachary Taylor's expedition that culminated in the Battle of Okeechobee in 1837. The Battle of Loxahatchee was fought soon afterwards as the primary engagements on the east coast of Florida during that period. The post was abandoned after the war. It was reopened during the Third Seminole War.

For most of its existence Fort Vinton was simply known as "Post #2" but was renamed in honor of Captain John Rogers Vinton (1801–1847), who had served in the area during the Second Seminole War and had died in the Mexican-American War.

Fort Vinton, was an outpost of Fort Capron at Indian River Inlet.
