= St. Lucie Village Historic District =

Historic district in Florida, United States

- U.S. National Register of Historic Places
- U.S. Historic district
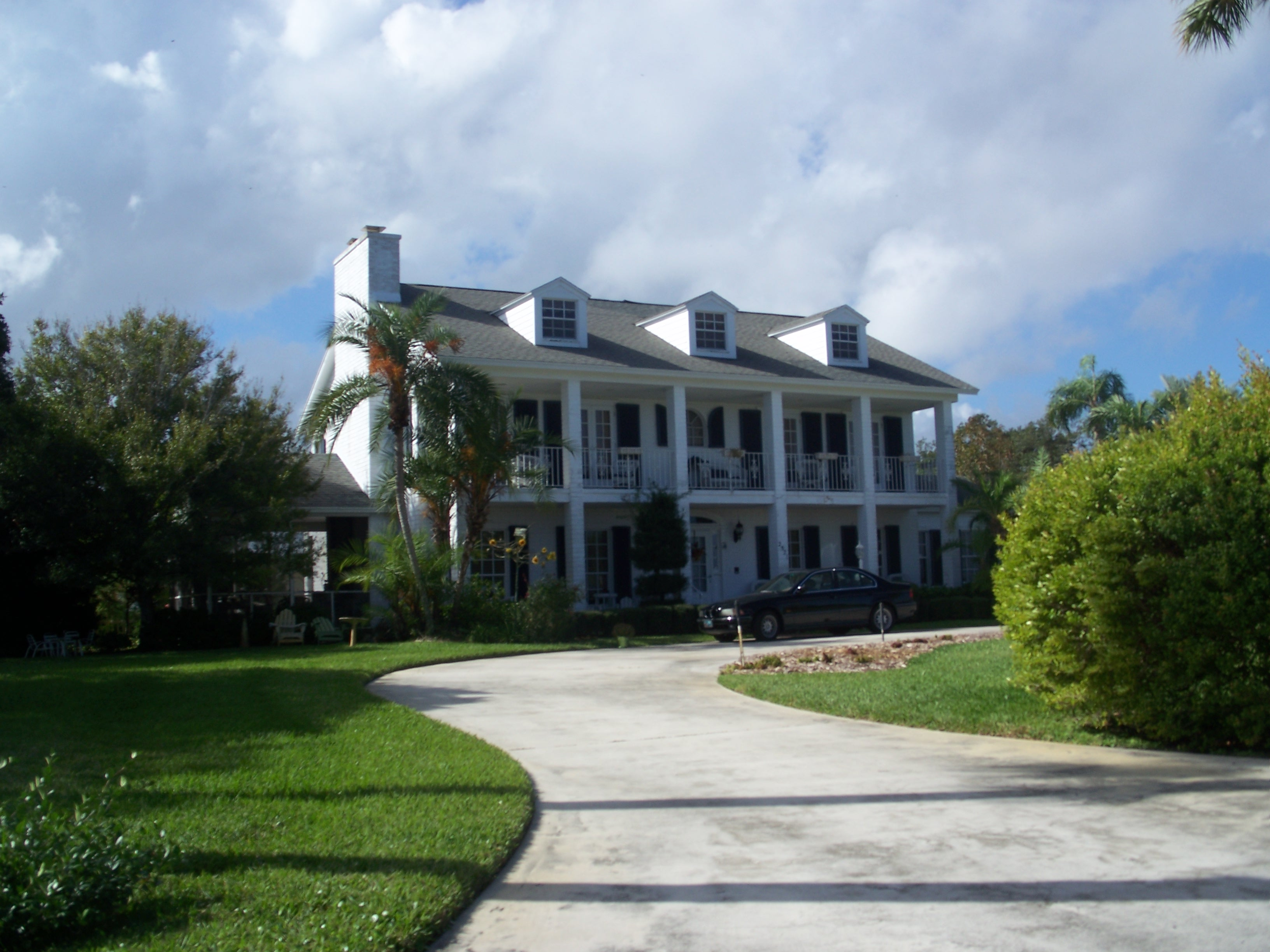

- Location within Florida Location within the United States
- Location: 2505-3305 N. Indian River Drive; St. Lucie Village, Florida 34946
- Coordinates: 27°29′17″N 80°20′10″W
- Area: 540 acres (2.2 km^{2})
- Built: 1850-1928
- Architectural style: Frame Vernacular, Late Victorian
- NRHP reference No.: 89002062
- Added to NRHP: December 1, 1989

The St. Lucie Village Historic District is a historic district located in St. Lucie Village, Florida. The district runs from 2505 through 3305 North Indian River Drive. Out of the 50 structures lining the Indian River Drive, 35 are of historical interest with the contributing structures ranging from Frame Vernacular to Late Victorian architecture. On December 1, 1989, the historic district was added to the National Register of Historic Places for its architectural and historical significance.

== History ==
The residential neighborhood exists as a remnant of the surrounding communities of Fort Capron which was built in support of the Third Seminole War during the 1850s. The fort served as housing for many men throughout the war and paved the way for the establishment of St. Lucie village after the establishment of the Armed Occupation Act.

A stone monument currently occupies the site of Fort Capron at 3015 North Indian River Drive. The east to west thoroughfare was to have been the entrance to a bridge that would span the Indian River, however while under construction the bridge was destroyed by the Hurricane of 1928.

The thoroughfare was named Chamberlin Boulevard after Mrs. Hattie Chamberlin of Kansas City, Missouri who planted a row of Washingtonian palms in the street's median during the Florida land boom of the 1920s.
