= Augustus Hoppin =

American book illustrator

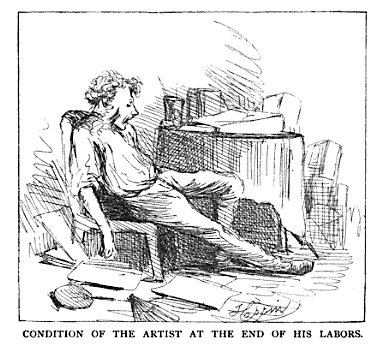
Self-portrait by Hoppin, 1872

Augustus Hoppin (1828–1896) was an American book illustrator, born in Providence, Rhode Island. He graduated from Brown University in 1848 and Harvard Law School in 1850 and was admitted to the bar, but soon gave up the law and went to Europe to study art. Upon his return to the United States he devoted himself to drawing on wood and to the illustration of books, in which he was successful. His pictures in Nothing to Wear (1857), Poliphar Papers (1853), and The Autocrat of the Breakfast-Table (1858) are widely known. He published several volumes of sketches and novels, among the latter Recollections of Auton House (1881) and Married for Fun (1885).
