= Courtland Hector Hoppin =

American artist and animator (1902–1974)

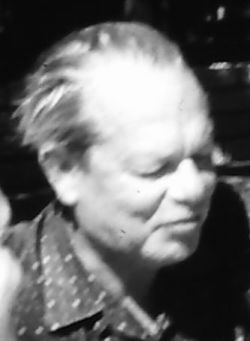
- Hoppin c. 1961
- Born: March 12, 1906; Washington, D.C., U.S.
- Died: January 28, 1974 (aged 67)
- Resting place: Palms Memorial Park, Sarasota, Florida, United States
- Known for: Pioneer in the field of animation
- Spouse(s): Caroline Benezet Smith Hoppin, Peggy Hoppin, Marion Crosby Hoppin

Courtland Hector Hoppin (March 12, 1906 – January 28, 1974) was an American artist, photographer and pioneer in the field of animated film. The works produced by Hector Hoppin and partner Tony Gross are studied today due to their artistry and as a reflection of the times in which they were created.

== Biography ==
Hoppin was born March 12, 1906, into a family of wealth and talent. He was the only child of Dorothy Woodville Rockhill and Dr. Joseph Clark Hoppin (1870–1925), who was a highly regarded archeologist, who taught at Bryn Mawr. His maternal grandfather, William Woodville Rockhill, was a diplomat and considered the first Westerner to gain audience with the Dalai Lama.

His paternal grandfather, Dr. Courtland Hoppin (1834–1876), for whom he was named, was one of twelve children born into a prominent and talented Providence, Rhode Island family. He and his brother Washington Hoppin, MD were homeopathic physicians. In 1863, Courtland married Mary Frances Clark (1842–1934), daughter of Joseph Washington Clark (1810–1892) and Eleanor Arnold Jackson Clark (1815–1896). Joseph Clark was a Boston investor, who purchased several hundred acres of land in Pomfret, Connecticut, on the west side of Pomfret Street, in 1888. He built a large summer house there, called "La Plaisance," and at the same time, Mary Frances Clark Hoppin, recently widowed, built a house nearby. These two houses still stand, and are included in the Pomfret Street Historic District. They are now both owned by Pomfret School.

In about 1892, Mary Frances Clark Hoppin built a much larger house on Deerfield Road, at the southwestern end of her father's property, next to her sister-in-law. She called the house "Courtlands." In 1900, after the main building of Pomfret School burned, she gave her first house to the school, and had it moved across the road, to be on the school's property. The house is now called Robinson House, and is the Admissions house for the school. Courtlands still stands, and houses the offices of LIUNA Training & Education Fund.

Courtland Hoppin, the younger, was educated at Pomfret School (1923), Harvard University and the University of Cambridge in England, where he obtained his master's degree. He subsequently studied art in Paris and served as Art Director of London Films until the outbreak of World War II. At about this time Courtland adopted the nom de plume of "Hector," and was sometimes called "Hector Hoppin." Following the war, he studied with psychologist Carl Jung in Switzerland, and worked in the area of clinical psychology in New York City during the 1950s. In 1948, Hector Hoppin published The Psychology of the Artist.

He retired to Lido Key in Sarasota, Florida in 1958, where he and his wife Marion were benefactors of New College of Florida, including a swimming pool and the endowment of a chair in Asian Studies.

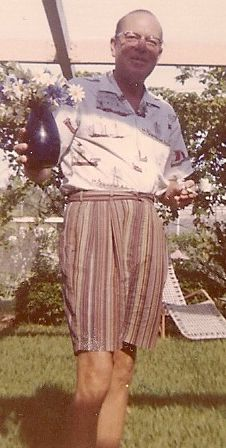
C.H. Hoppin in his Sarasota, Florida, home, December 1961

== Pioneer work in animation ==
While living in Paris in the 1930s, Hoppin collaborated on several animated films with print-maker and painter Anthony Gross, providing his skill as an artist and photographer as well as the capital for the projects. The first animated film of the company they titled "HG Productions" was Une Journée en Afrique. Completed in 1932, it was followed by Les Funérailles and, in 1934, with their most popular and successful work, La Joie de Vivre. Hoppin and Gross hired Hungarian composer Tibor Harsanyi to compose music for the sound track of the film. La Joie de Vivre is described as a break from the "limiting comic tradition of the 1930s cartoon animation", and its free, decorative style and vague politics permitted its re-release in France during the early 1940s by the Vichy government.

Frisky, naughty and bursting with raw power: [La Joie de Vivre] is one of the most technically adept animations ever made, and represents a milestone in the development of an international style of animation on par with the Art Deco movement.

The nine-minute film is described in the Internet Movie Database as "A tone poem [in which] two woodland sprites dance about, atop power lines and among flowers and leaves, while being pursued. Everyone spends some time pulling levers to switch trains, too."

Following the success of this film, the pair produced works titled The Storm and Fox Hunt. Fox Hunt received praise for its use of color "with freedom and beauty quite outside Mr. Disney's picture-book range." In 1938, Hoppin and Gross began their most ambitious work, Around the World in Eighty Days, a color feature based on the Jules Verne novel financed by Alexander Korda of London Films. The project, however, was interrupted by World War II; all traces of the film were thought to have been lost, but in 1956 some negatives were discovered in a projection room at the National Film Theatre in London and efforts were made to piece-together a portion of the original work. The restored section has a running-time of eighteen minutes.

"A reel of negatives from the London lab of Technicolor was all that remained. With the assistance of the British Film Institute's Experimental Production Fund, contributing some transitional scenes – such as animated diagrams of the voyage through the Suez Canal – it was possible to construct a usable, coherent, even vivacious film of great beauty. Hoppin & Gross were innovators. Only the informed eye of a painter could have chosen the colour-palette; the characters are intelligently animated, caricatured with distinction. Of all the film projects that year arising from producers keen to follow the success of Disney's Snow White, Around The World in 80 Days shines like a beacon turned towards the future. Despite some technical weaknesses and its truncated form, the film is a substantial achievement."

The New York Public Library has a copy of this film, titled Around the World in Eighteen Minutes, published by McGraw-Hill in 1962.

== Personal life ==
Hoppin married three times. His first wife, Caroline Benezet Smith Hoppin, died in 1939. She was the mother of their two sons, Nicholas (1936–1965) and David (1939–1978). He was divorced from second wife, Peggy Hoppin, and was survived by the third, Marion Josephine Crosby Hoppin (1905–1996), whom he met while studying psychology with Carl Gustav Jung in Switzerland.
