= 1871 Atlantic hurricane season =

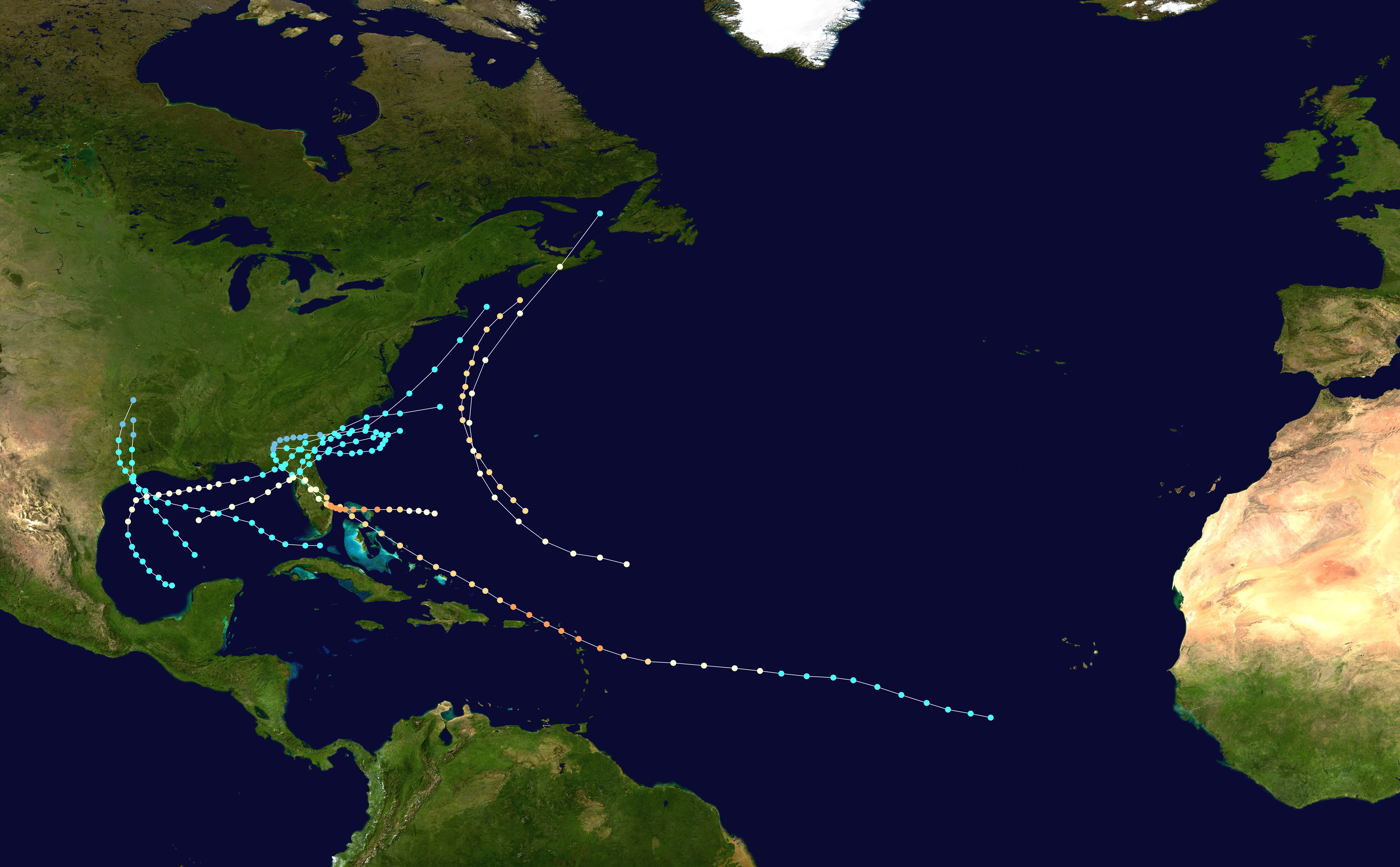
- Season summary map

Seasonal boundaries
- First system formed: June 1, 1871
- Last system dissipated: October 13, 1871

Strongest storm
- Name: Three
  - Maximum winds: 115 mph (185 km/h) (1-minute sustained)
  - Lowest pressure: 952 mbar (hPa; 28.11 inHg)

Seasonal statistics
- Total storms: 8
- Hurricanes: 6
- Major hurricanes (Cat. 3+): 2
- Total fatalities: ≥35
- Total damage: > $21,000 (1871 USD)

The 1871 Atlantic hurricane season became the first of six seasons in which at least three hurricanes are known to have made landfall in the U.S. state of Florida. Records show that 1871 featured eight tropical cyclones, four of which intensified into hurricanes, while two of those strengthened into major hurricanes. (Note: A major hurricane is a storm that ranks as Category 3 or higher on the Saffir–Simpson hurricane wind scale.) However, in the absence of modern satellite and other remote-sensing technologies, only storms that affected populated land areas or encountered ships at sea were recorded, so the actual total could be higher. According to a study in 2004, an undercount bias of zero to six tropical cyclones per year between 1851 and 1885 and zero to four per year between 1886 and 1910 is possible. A later study in 2008 estimated that eight or more storms may have been missed prior to 1878.

Of the known 1871 cyclones, both the fifth and eighth cyclones were first documented in 1995 by meteorologists José Fernández-Partagás and Henry Díaz, who also proposed large changes to the known tracks of the third and fourth systems. Further analysis, by the Atlantic hurricane reanalysis project in 2008, extended the duration of both the third and seventh storms by one day each. A reanalysis authored by climate scientist Michael Chenoweth, published in 2014, found fifteen named storms, twelve of which became hurricanes; four attained major hurricane status. However, these results have yet to be officially accepted into the Atlantic hurricane database (HURDAT).

The season's first known was initially detected over the Straits of Florida on June 1. Back-to-back tropical storms made landfall in Texas, with the first causing four deaths and the second causing one death. No further known activity occurred for more than two months, until two consecutive hurricanes struck the Bahamas and Florida in mid to late August. Both became Category 3 hurricanes on the present-day Saffir–Simpson scale, while the first of the two, the season's third cyclone overall, became the most intense in the Atlantic basin that year and caused one death in South Carolina. The season's fourth cyclone killed at least 27 people in the Virgin Islands prior to striking the Bahamas and Florida. Later, the sixth and seventh systems both impacted the Gulf Coast of the United States and made landfall in Florida, with the latter producing high winds and rough seas in Texas and Louisiana, leading to at least two fatalities due to maritime incidents and about $5,000 (1871 USD) in damage in southeastern Louisiana alone. (Note: All damage figures are in 1871 USD, unless otherwise noted) On October 13, the eighth and final cyclone of the season struck Nova Scotia before last being noted over the Gulf of St. Lawrence, drowning three people along the coast of the province and inflicting more than $16,000 in damage throughout Atlantic Canada.

== Season summary ==
HURDAT recognizes eight tropical cyclones for the 1871 season. Of the eight systems, six intensified into a hurricane, while two of those strengthened into a major hurricane. However, a 2004 study estimated that HURDAT excludes up to six cyclones per year between 1851 and 1885 and up to four per year between 1886 and 1910, while a 2008 study calculated that eight or more storms may have been missed before 1878. Three of these hurricanes made landfall in Florida, a feat that has only occurred in five other seasons, 1886, 1964, 2004, 2005, and 2024. José Fernández-Partagás and Henry F. Díaz added the fifth and eighth storms during their 1995 reanalysis and significantly modified the tracks of the third and fourth systems. In 2008, the Atlantic hurricane reanalysis project did not increase or decrease the number of storms and only made significant changes to the third and the seventh systems in comparison to Fernández-Partagás and Díaz, extending the duration of both storms by one day. A reanalysis by climate researcher Michael Chenoweth, published in 2014, adds eight storms and removes one, the second system, for a total of fifteen cyclones, including twelve hurricanes, four of which become major hurricanes. Chenoweth's study utilizes a more extensive collection of newspapers and ship logs, as well as late 19th century weather maps for the first time, in comparison to previous reanalysis projects. However, Chenoweth's proposals have yet to be incorporated into HURDAT.

Seasonal activity began by June 1, when a brig encountered a tropical storm over the Straits of Florida. The storm moved west-northwestward to northwestward across the Gulf of Mexico, striking Texas on June 4, causing four deaths. June featured another tropical storm, which also made landfall in Texas, killing one person before dissipating on June 10. No further known activity occurred until August 14, when the third system was first detected northeast of the Bahamas. Becoming the most intense storm of the season, the cyclone peaked as a Category 3 with maximum sustained winds of 115 mph (185 km/h) and a minimum atmospheric pressure of 952 mbar (28.1 inHg) and struck the Bahamas and Florida around this intensity. One person drowned in South Carolina. Later in August, the season's fourth cyclone killed at least 27 people in the Virgin Islands prior to striking the Bahamas and Florida. One more storm formed in August, but it is not known to have made landfall. Two systems developed in September, both peaked as Category 1 hurricanes and impacted the Gulf Coast of the United States, the second of which, the season's seventh cyclone, produced high winds and rough seas in Texas and Louisiana, leading to seven fatalities due to maritime incidents and about $5,000 in damage in southeastern Louisiana alone. The eighth and final known storm existed in October, striking Nova Scotia as a Category 1 hurricane on October 13, hours before being last noted over the Gulf of St. Lawrence. Atlantic Canada suffered more than $16,000 in damage, while the hurricane drowned three people in Nova Scotia. Collectively, the storms of the 1871 season caused more than 40 deaths and over $21,000 in damage.

The season's activity was reflected with an accumulated cyclone energy (ACE) rating of 88, tied with the previous season for the second highest total of the decade, behind only 1878. ACE is a metric used to express the energy used by a tropical cyclone during its lifetime. Therefore, a storm with a longer duration will have higher values of ACE. It is only calculated at six-hour increments in which specific tropical and subtropical systems are either at or above sustained wind speeds of 39 mph (63 km/h), which is the threshold for tropical storm intensity. Thus, tropical depressions are not included here.

== Systems ==
=== Tropical Storm One ===
- Tropical storm (SSHWS)
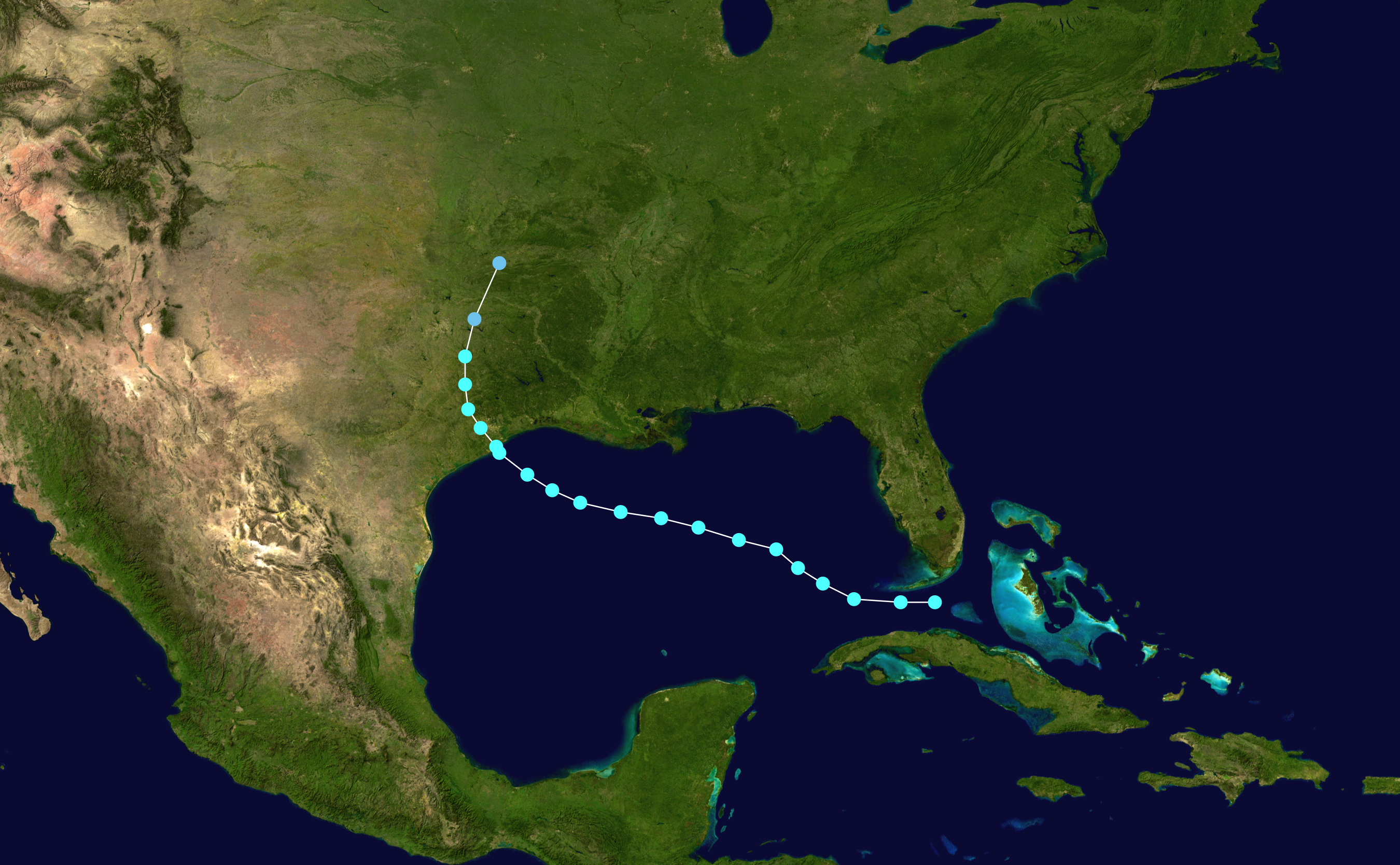
- Duration: June 1 – June 5
- Peak intensity: 60 mph (95 km/h) (1-min); ≤999 mbar (hPa)

The brig Nellie Ware encountered a tropical storm over the southeastern Gulf of Mexico on June 1. Consequently, HURDAT started tracking the storm on that day at 00:00 UTC about 60 mi (95 km) east-southeast of Key West, Florida. For the next 12 hours, the system moved westward over the Straits of Florida between Cuba and the lower Florida Keys. Entering the southeastern Gulf of Mexico, the cyclone turned to the northwest and strengthened. While located 165 mi (265 km) west-northwest of the Dry Tortugas, it attained peak winds of 60 mph (95 km/h) early on June 2. Afterward, the system gradually turned west-northwestward. As the cyclone neared the Texas coast, its course shifted to the northwest. At 07:00 UTC on June 4, the storm made landfall over San Luis Pass, 50 mi (80 km) south-southeast of Houston, at peak intensity. After landfall, the storm curved northward over East Texas and dissipated over eastern Oklahoma late on June 5.

Chenoweth's study delayed genesis by a day and a half, treating this and the next storm as one cyclone that hit Galveston, Texas, twice, first as a low-end hurricane. Looping inland between Matagorda and Galveston Bays, it weakened to a depression before reemerging offshore. Restrengthening, it sidewinded northeastward, striking Galveston as a strong tropical storm and Louisiana as a minimal hurricane, the latter at its peak of 80 mph (130 km/h). It then crossed southeastern Louisiana, southern Mississippi, and northwestern Alabama, dissipating a few days later than officially indicated.

A weather station in Galveston recorded peak winds of 39 mph (63 km/h) and a total of 6 in (150 mm) of rain during the passage of the storm, of which 3.95 in (100 mm) fell in a fourteen-minute time span on June 4. Another source indicated 15.57 in (395 mm) of rainfall took place, including a twenty-four-hour record of 8.55 in (217 mm) on June 4. Additionally, a barometer in the area sampled a minimum peripheral pressure of 999 mbar (29.51 inHg). Storm surge flooded and eroded Galveston Island, causing washouts of railroad beds and structures. One vessel, the steamship Alabama, was beached at Galveston, while another, the Virginia Dare, grounded on an offshore sandbar there. Four drownings occurred at Galveston. Gale-force winds also affected Port Aransas; very high tides occurred there and at Indianola, flooding low ground at the latter place. Extremely heavy rains associated with this cyclone also caused flooding in New Orleans, which was reportedly "submerged", according to meteorologist David Roth. The New York Times on June 6 reported that floodwaters covered 6 mi^{2} (16 km^{2}), approximately 500 blocks in all.

=== Tropical Storm Two ===
- Tropical storm (SSHWS)
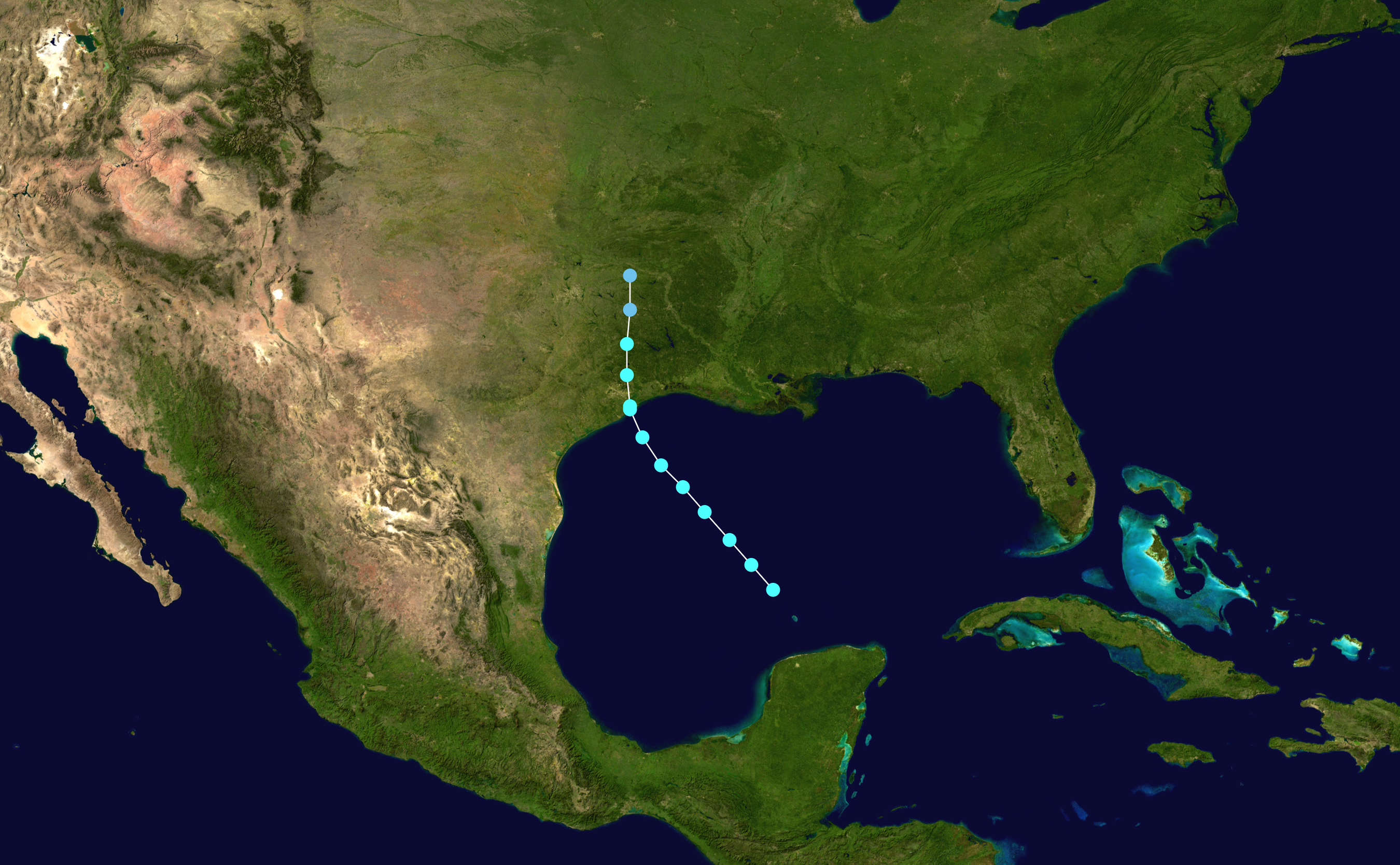
- Duration: June 8 – June 10
- Peak intensity: 60 mph (95 km/h) (1-min);

At 00:00 UTC on June 8, the second tropical storm of the season developed 155 mi (250 km) north-northwest of Progreso, Yucatán, three days after the previous system dissipated. Taking a steady course to the northwest, the cyclone closely followed its predecessor, threatening Southeast Texas. Early on June 9, the system peaked at 60 mph (95 km/h) and turned north-northwestward. At 17:00 UTC, the cyclone made landfall near present-day Jamaica Beach, 15 mi (25 km) west-southwest of Galveston, at peak intensity. After landfall, the system headed northward over the western part of Galveston Bay. Late on June 10, the cyclone dissipated over East Texas, just south of the Texas–Oklahoma border. Chenoweth's reanalysis tentatively determined that this storm and the preceding system were a single hurricane.

As it affected Galveston, the storm destroyed a church and many houses. Storm surge occurred on the island for the second time in a week, as floodwaters engulfed the eastern section of Galveston Island. Several ships wrecked as well, and some sailing ships were deemed lost at sea. A cotton steamship, the Mollie Hambleton, sank while at anchor. One person died at Refugio, when winds unroofed a church. Storm surge-related flooding was minimal at Indianola. Strong gales affected coastal Louisiana and neared hurricane intensity at Lake Charles, downing fruit trees. Torrential rain damaged corn and cotton crops, and numerous cattle drowned. A tornado struck Chatawa, Mississippi, destroying a schoolhouse and trees.

=== Hurricane Three ===
- Category 3 hurricane (SSHWS)
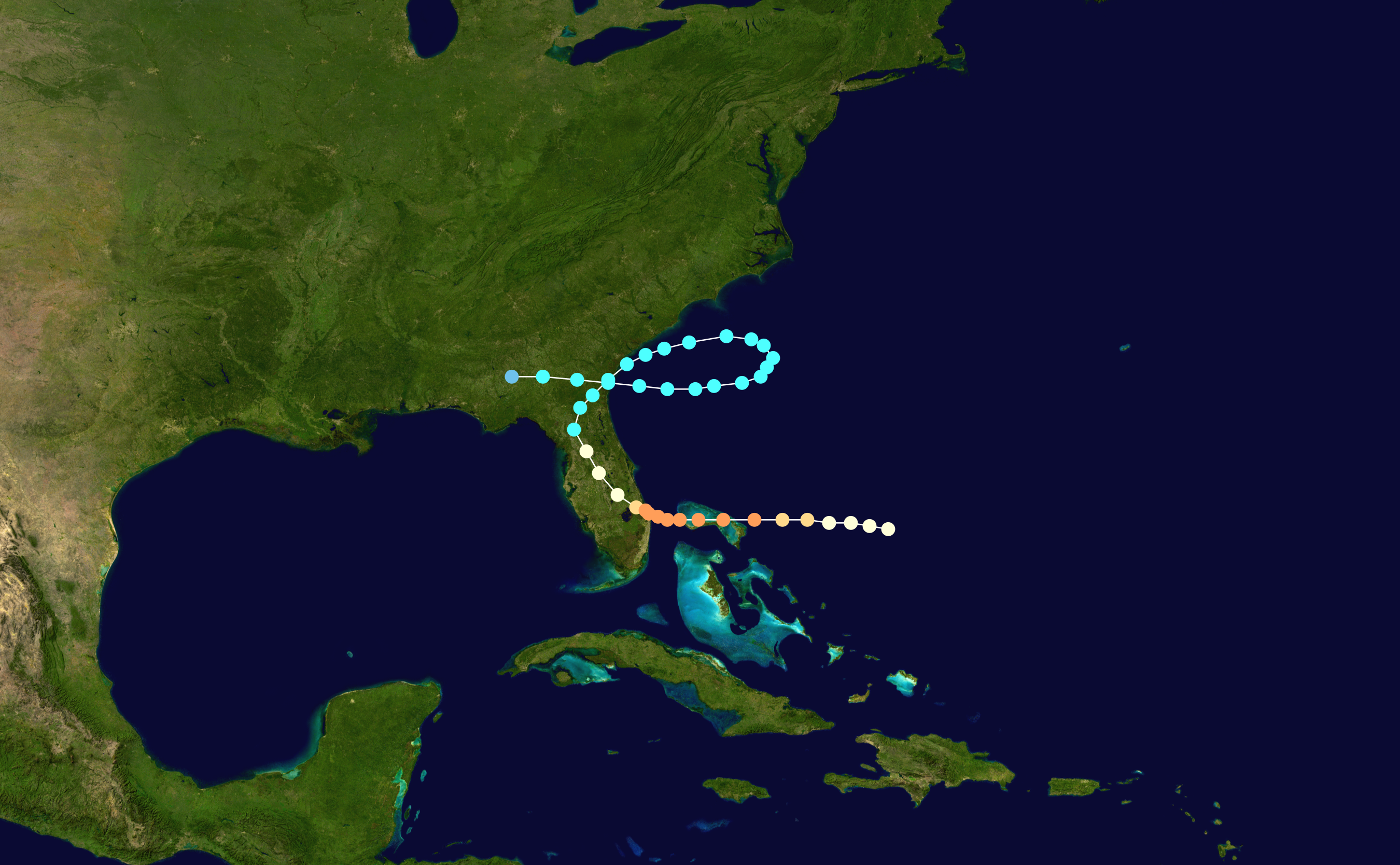
- Duration: August 14 – August 23
- Peak intensity: 115 mph (185 km/h) (1-min); 952 mbar (hPa)

Early on August 14, the ship Tybee reported hurricane-force winds to the east of the Bahamas, signaling the presence of a well-formed system. At 00:00 UTC on August 14, the third tropical cyclone of the season was noted, 210 mi (340 km) northeast of San Salvador Island, with 90-mph (150-km/h) winds. Tracking generally westward, the hurricane gradually strengthened. At 12:00 UTC on August 15, the cyclone attained peak winds of 115 mph (185 km/h)—equivalent to Category 3 status on the modern Saffir–Simpson scale, which it maintained until landfall in Florida. Several hours later, the hurricane crossed the northern Abaco Islands and continued westward toward the Gulf Stream. Early on August 16, a barque, the Bridgeport, measured a pressure of 952 mbar (28.10 inHg) in the storm's eye. As it neared eastern Florida, the storm curved slightly west-northwestward, before making landfall north of present-day Hobe Sound at 02:00 UTC on August 17. Over the next few days, the cyclone parabolically turned to the northeast, re-entering the Atlantic near Darien, Georgia, on August 18. While executing a clockwise loop off the Southeastern United States, the system maintained winds just below hurricane intensity. On August 22, the system ended its loop and headed westward, toward the Georgia coast. Final landfall occurred near Brunswick at 00:00 UTC on August 23. At the time, the cyclone still contained winds of 70 mph (110 km/h). The system decayed as it moved inland, and dissipation took place 18 hours later. The 2014 reanalysis study by Chenoweth extends the duration of this storm back two days, with formation occurring on August 12. However, Chenoweth's proposed path is similar, aside from nixing the cyclonic loop but still indicating a landfall in Georgia after striking Florida and re-entering the Atlantic.

Despite crossing the Bahamas at peak strength, damage in the archipelago, if any, is unknown. The hurricane was of great extent as it struck Florida, with hurricane-force winds occurring at New Smyrna—100 mi (160 km) from the eye. The local U.S. Army Signal Corps observer judged the storm to be the worst since a hurricane in October 1865. In New Smyrna, the storm snapped or otherwise damaged oak and citrus trees. At Enterprise, several homes were unroofed as well. Winds destroyed another home at Ocala. A rain gauge in Putnam County collected 8 1/2 in (220 mm) in a day. Cotton, oranges, and sugar cane crops in Hillsborough County experienced their largest losses since the 1848 hurricane. A report from Gainesville deemed the storm the worst locally in many years, noting that the "most comely shade trees" in town were downed, along with much timber elsewhere. A mariner from Sand Point (now Titusville) dubbed the storm "the worst in thirty years". Fierce winds unroofed and destroyed many homes along the coast, while snapping "immense" pine and oak trees "like carrots". The local orange crop was devastated, and present-day Brevard County was "a scene of desolation and ruin". Numerous ships were tossed ashore, leaving the beaches "strewn with wrecks", according to a weather observer at New Smyrna. Gale-force winds in Jacksonville uprooted many trees, topped a few brick walls, damaged tin roofs, and downed telegraph wires, cutting off communications. Abnormally high tides inundated parts of the city, but the Jacksonville Courier noted that water remained "about a foot [0.3 m] below the market floor." Damage in Jacksonville reached several thousand dollars. Impacts to Georgia, if any, are unknown. Winds reached 60 mph (97 km/h) in Savannah, which registered a pressure of 1,001 mbar (29.55 inHg). In South Carolina, Charleston reportedly experienced its heaviest rain storm since 1854, with 8.53 in (217 mm) of precipitation falling in a 36-hour period, more than 2 in (51 mm) above the total amount of rainfall observed between May 1 and August 1. However, little flooding occurred except on a few streets. One man drowned after attempting to step from a wharf to his sloop during the height of the storm. A telegram from North Carolina described the rainfall as being generally beneficial to crops in the vicinity of Wilmington and reported that the brig Alice Lee was beached at Frying Pan Shoals.

=== Hurricane Four ===
- Category 3 hurricane (SSHWS)
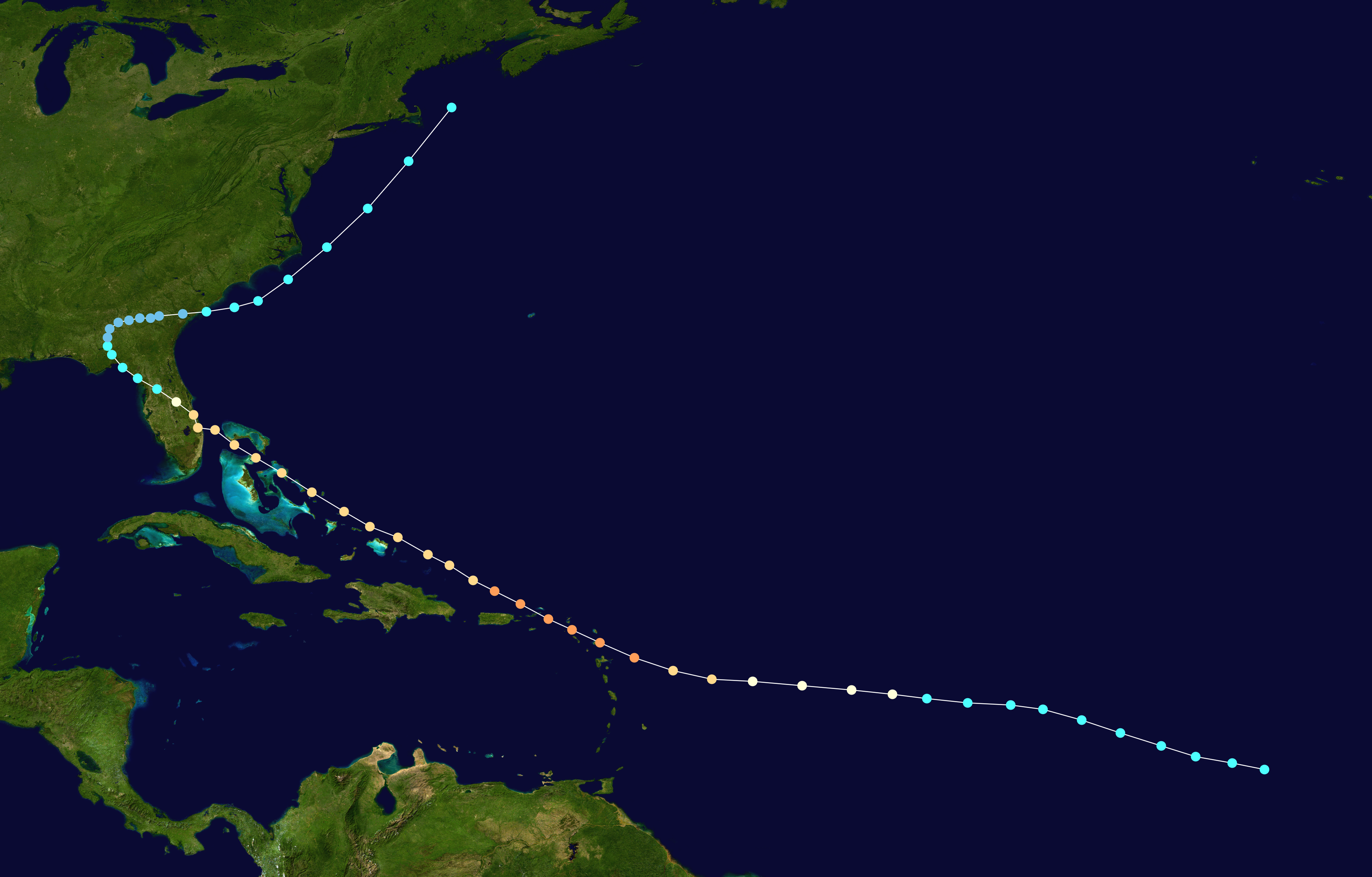
- Duration: August 17 – August 30
- Peak intensity: 115 mph (185 km/h) (1-min); 962 mbar (hPa)

On August 17, the track of the fourth system begins about 550 mi (885 km) west-southwest of the Cabo Verde islands. The system progressed on a west-northwest track and steadily intensified, becoming a major hurricane at 00:00 UTC on August 21. Bearing peak winds of 115 mph (185 km/h), the hurricane passed over Antigua, Sint Eustatius, Saint Kitts, and Saint Thomas and within 30 mi (50 km) of Puerto Rico. The hurricane weakened to a Category 2 hurricane on August 22, maintaining this strength while making further landfalls in the Bahamas. At 05:00 UTC on August 25, the storm struck near present-day Vero Beach, Florida, with winds of 105 mph (165 km/h). After crossing Central Florida, it briefly entered the Gulf of Mexico and struck Taylor County, as a tropical storm. The storm then moved north and east over southern Georgia, weakening into a tropical depression, before strengthening back into a tropical storm after re-emerging into the Atlantic off South Carolina. At 12:00 UTC on August 30, the cyclone reattained winds of 70 mph (110 km/h). The storm was last sighted 90 mi (145 km) east of Cape Cod. Chenoweth's study reassessed the hurricane as a low-end Category 4 over the Leeward Islands, with a pressure of 947 mbar (28.0 inHg), and shifted the landfall in Florida farther south, close to the present-day Broward–Palm Beach county line. Chenoweth also outlines a track farther inland, over portions of Alabama and Tennessee, before recurvature over the Appalachian Mountains and reemergence into the Atlantic near Norfolk, Virginia.

Although the National Hurricane Center (NHC) lists 27 deaths, the newspaper The Dominican recorded 30 fatalities on Antigua, which reportedly experienced its worst storm since 1835. Le Moniteur de la Martinique reported two fatalities and considerable damage on Saint Kitts. Resident Catholic priest Father Koch observed a barometric pressure of 998 mbar (29.5 inHg) on Saba and the destruction of many thatch houses. The Georgia Weekly Telegraph and Georgia Journal & Messenger noted that "not a house was left standing on the whole island" on Saint Thomas and that the storm killed or injured about 150 people. Additionally, numerous shipwrecks occurred, including three ships lost in Puerto Rico, where the storm was dubbed the Santa Juana hurricane. Strong winds generated by the storm in the Bahamas caused the loss of thousands of fruits, prostrated several trees, and damaged a few buildings in Nassau, including destroying a fire station and unroofing a warehouse. On Bimini the storm swept out to sea 81 watercraft, some of which later drifted far inland, and destroyed or damaged 63 homes, along with a church and schoolroom. The sea cut a deep channel through North Bimini, where all crops were ruined. In Florida, storm surge and abnormally high tides damaged a number of boats in the St. Johns River. Winds in the Jacksonville area mainly toppled fences and trees, although a warehouse and church were destroyed. Fallen telegraph wires severed communications between Lake City and St. Augustine. The storm demolished several dwellings in Orlando and many others at nearby Fort Reid, along with a gristmill at Fort Mellon. The Weekly Floridian commented that the surrounding countryside was littered with "one solid fallen mass" of timber "for miles and miles". Several other localities reported crop damage, including Palatka, Marianna, and Marion County. Some homes were blown off their foundations near Ocala, and fencing was "almost universally destroyed" according to the Ocala Banner.

=== Hurricane Five ===
- Category 2 hurricane (SSHWS)
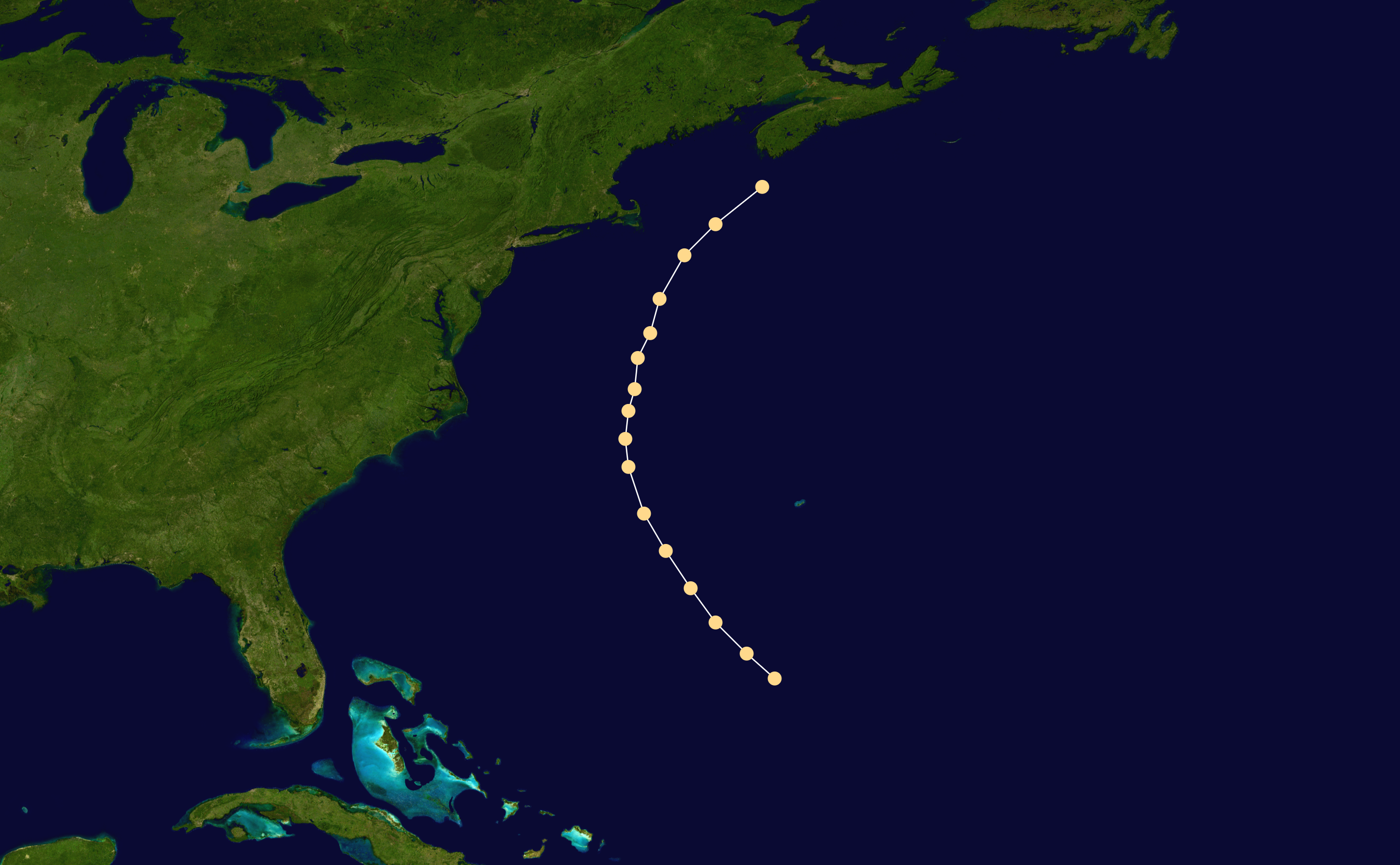
- Duration: August 30 – September 2
- Peak intensity: 105 mph (165 km/h) (1-min);

The only storm of the year not to make landfall, this system was first observed by the ship Dutch Princess on August 30 south of Bermuda, recording sustained winds of nearly 105 mph (165 km/h), equivalent to a Category 2 hurricane. Consequently, HURDAT initiates the track of this storm at that intensity approximately 385 mi (620 km) south of the island. With the ships Henry Palmer, City of Brooklyn, and Galatea clocking similar wind speeds over the next few days, HURDAT indicates that the cyclone maintained this intensity until it was last observed about 65 mi (105 km) southwest of the southern tip of Nova Scotia. Chenoweth's reanalysis shows genesis three days earlier, with the storm attaining hurricane status a day sooner. The storm is also depicted as a major hurricane at its peak, with winds of 120 mph (195 km/h), based on a measured barometric pressure of 941 mbar (27.8 inHg). Chenoweth also indicates that the system made landfall on Nova Scotia as a minimal hurricane on September 3.

=== Hurricane Six ===
- Category 1 hurricane (SSHWS)
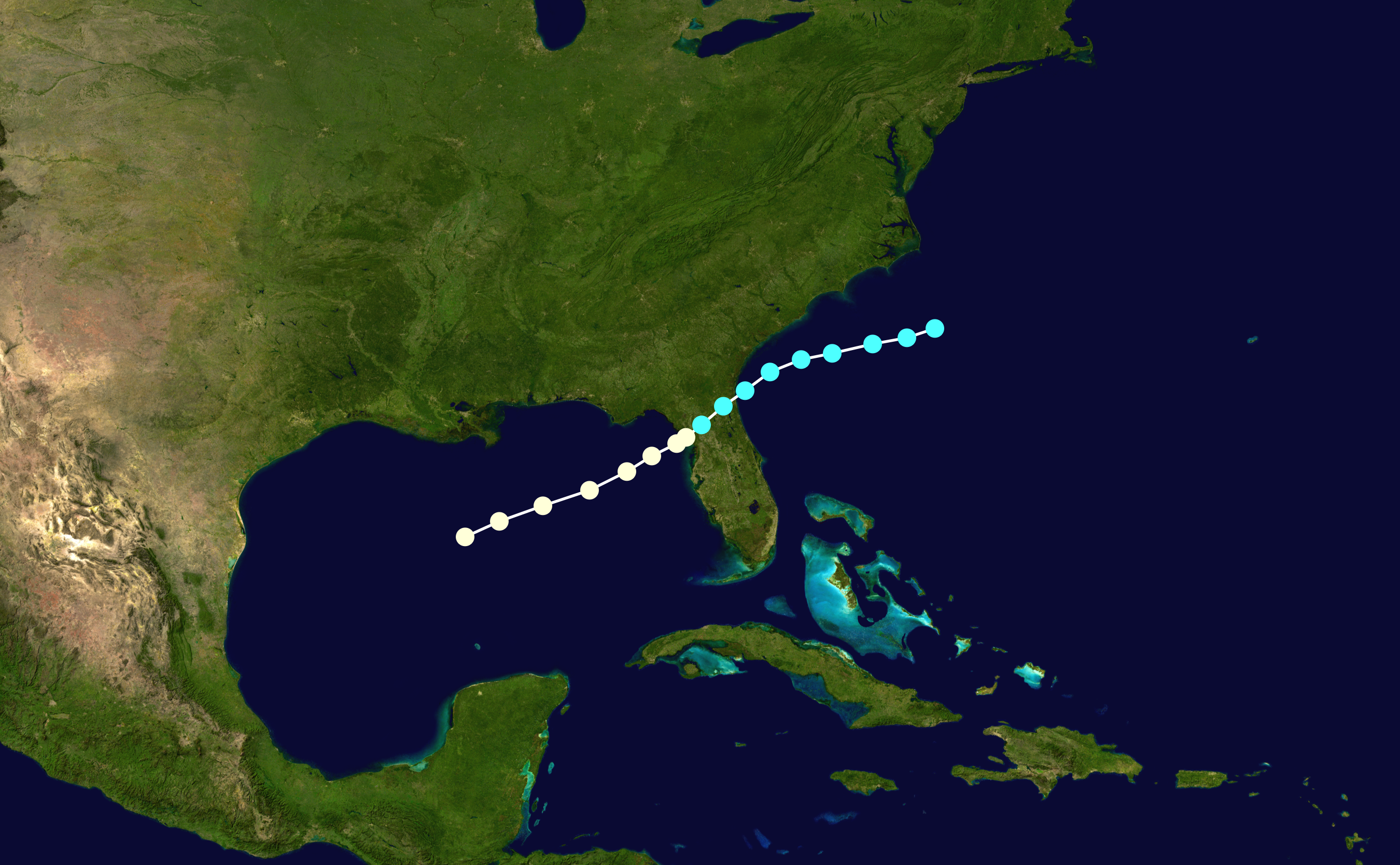
- Duration: September 5 – September 8
- Peak intensity: 80 mph (130 km/h) (1-min); 982 mbar (hPa)

The schooner Robert Myhan encountered a hurricane with winds of 80 mph (130 km/h) on September 5, likely located near the geographic center of the Gulf of Mexico. At 14:00 UTC the next day, the cyclone made landfall near Cedar Key, Florida, as a minimal hurricane, with an estimated barometric pressure of 982 mbar (29.0 inHg). Quickly weakening to a tropical storm, the system moved northeastward across Florida and emerged into the Atlantic early on September 7. Later that day, the storm curved east-northeastward and was last noted late on September 8 offshore North Carolina. Both this and the following storm roughly paralleled each other.

Chenoweth's study also begins the track of this storm over the Gulf of Mexico and eventually shows it striking Florida. However, the storm instead originates just offshore Tampa and makes landfall near Port St. Joe. The cyclone also crossed through Georgia before emerging into the Atlantic, where it dissipated east of the state on September 9. Heavy rainfall occurred in Florida and Georgia. In Tallahassee, several ponds on the west side of the city overflowed and roads were damaged in many places by floodwaters. The Macon area of Georgia reported heavy losses to cotton crops. Additionally, the brig Martha suffered significant damage about 70 mi (115 km) east of Tybee Island.

=== Hurricane Seven ===
- Category 1 hurricane (SSHWS)
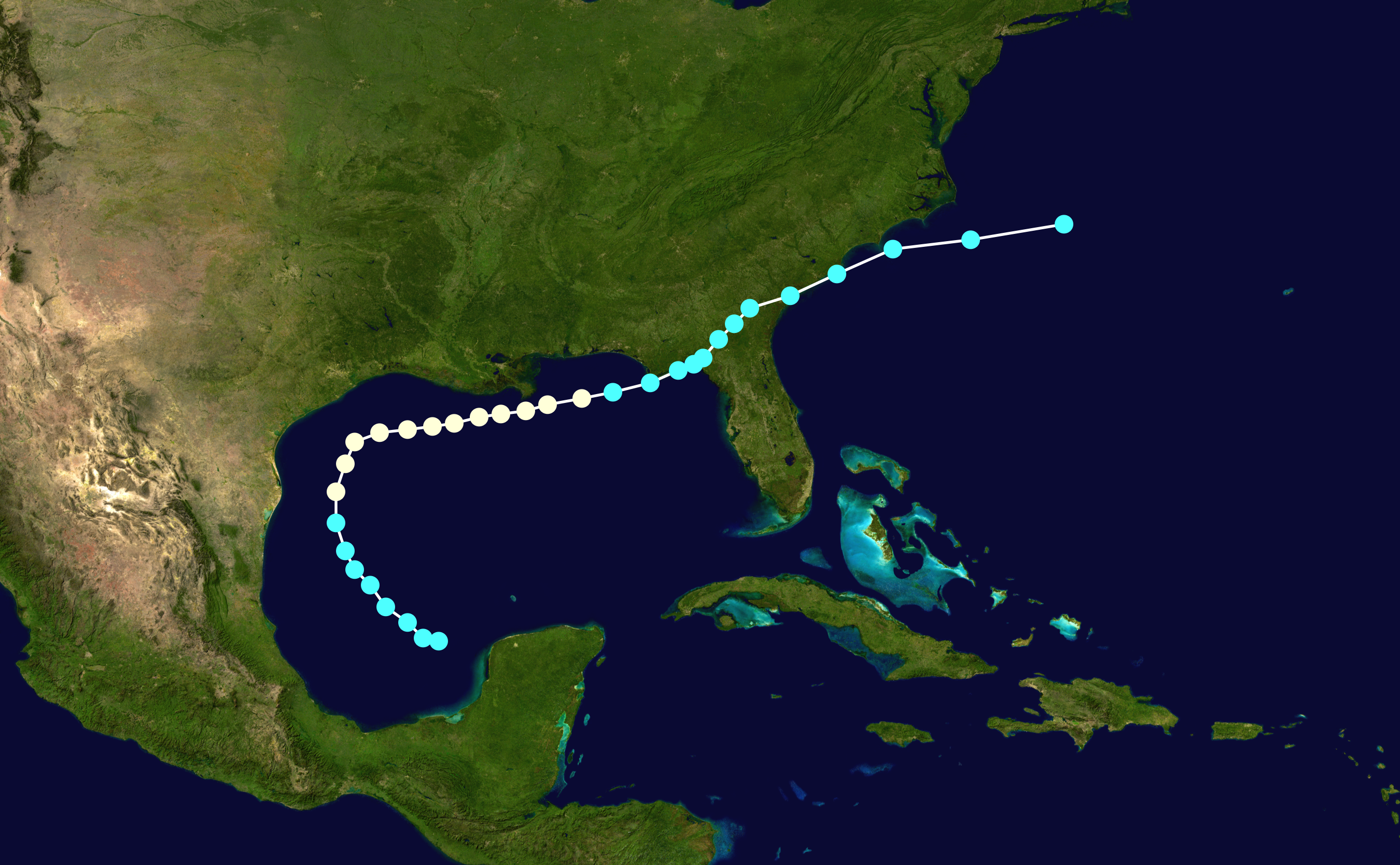
- Duration: September 30 – October 7
- Peak intensity: 80 mph (130 km/h) (1-min);

A tropical storm was first sighted in the Bay of Campeche on September 30. After initially moving northwestward, the cyclone turned northeastward and intensified into a hurricane on October 2, peaking with maximum sustained winds of 80 mph (130 km/h). Later that day, the hurricane turned east-northeastward and passed just south of the Mississippi River Delta early on October 4. At 16:00 UTC the next day, the cyclone finally made landfall in Taylor County, Florida, as a strong tropical storm with winds of 70 mph (110 km/h). After re-entering the Atlantic near Hilton Head Island, South Carolina, late on October 6, the storm was last sighted on the following day roughly 200 mi (320 km) east-southwest of Cape Hatteras, North Carolina. Chenoweth extended the cyclone's duration back to September 28 as a tropical depression. His study also adjusted the track to cross Plaquemines Parish, Louisiana, and strike near Horseshoe Beach, Florida. The storm then dissipated over Georgia on October 6.

In Texas, tides reached their highest level at Indianola since 1844, flooding most of the town. Abnormally high tides elsewhere in the state damaged some warehouses in Port Lavaca and caused several ships to wreck or founder, particularly near Galveston, leading to at least two deaths. However, Roth stated that at least three fatalities occurred due to the storm and that "all hands were lost" on the ships C. K. Hall and the ship S. S. Hall, except for one on the former. Roth also attributed four deaths to the hurricane in Louisiana when the Robert Bruce capsized offshore. The hurricane downed many large trees in southeastern Louisiana, unroofed homes, toppled telegraph poles, and beached some pilot boats, causing about $5,000 in damage.

=== Hurricane Eight ===
- Category 1 hurricane (SSHWS)
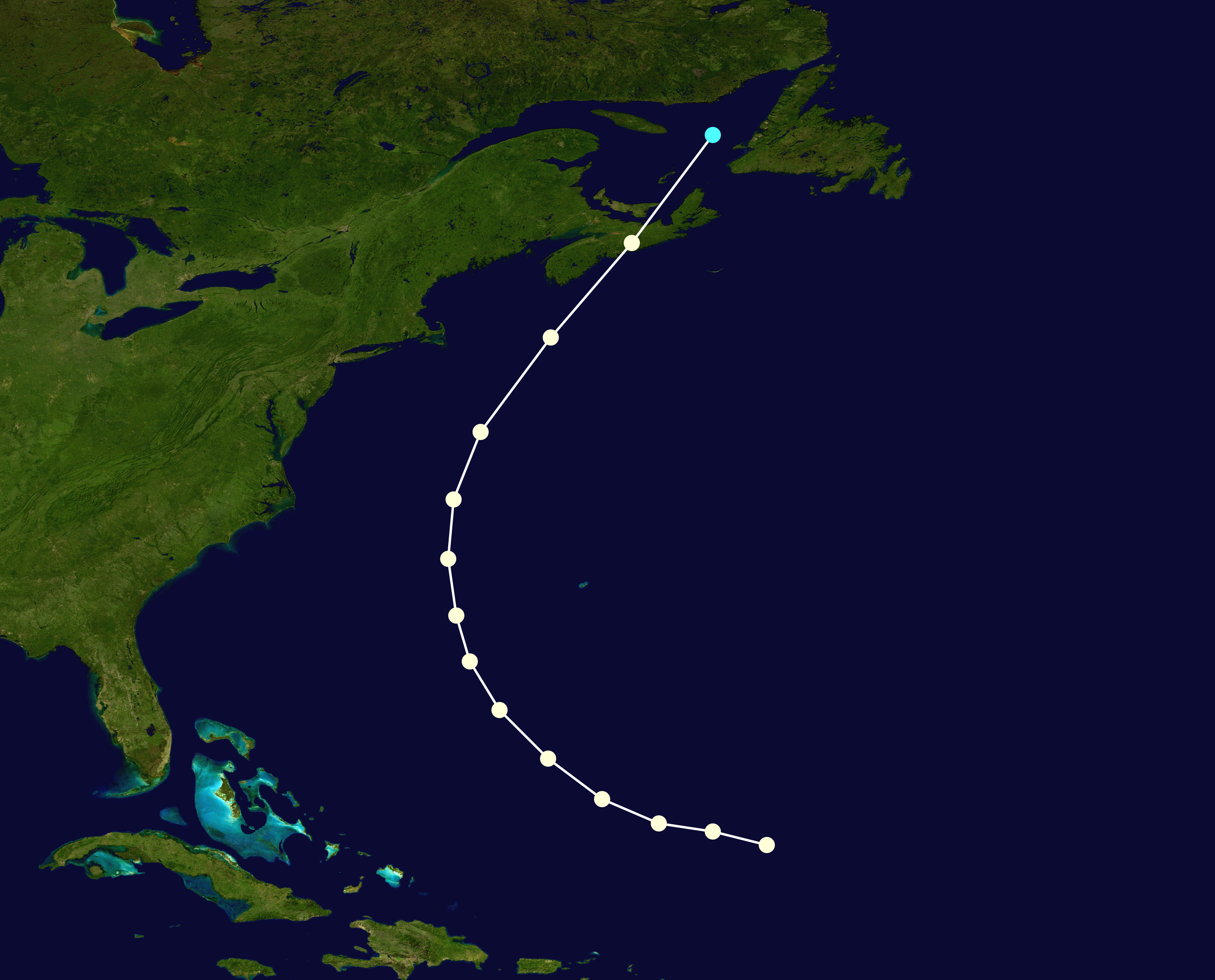
- Duration: October 10 – October 13
- Peak intensity: 80 mph (130 km/h) (1-min);

On October 10, the ship Nellie Antrim first observed this system northeast of the British Virgin Islands, with sustained winds of 80 mph (130 km/h). Consequently, HURDAT begins the track of this storm as a Category 1 hurricane roughly 425 mi (685 km) northeast of Barbuda on October 10. Its intensity remained steady at that level while initially moving westward, prior to turning northward and then paralleling the East Coast of the United States. The hurricane made landfall near Pleasant Point, Nova Scotia, early on October 13 and was last noted hours later as a tropical storm over the Gulf of St. Lawrence. Chenoweth's study indicates formation occurred five days earlier, over the tropical Atlantic. The storm is also estimated to have peaked with winds of 140 mph (220 km/h) on October 10, equivalent to a Category 4 hurricane, based on a pressure of 930 mbar (27 inHg). The system then neared the Canadian Maritimes with winds approaching 100 mph (155 km/h) and made landfall as a low-end hurricane.

In Nova Scotia, strong winds produced by the storm reportedly downed all telegraph wires between Bedford and Halifax. The railroad tracks linking the two cities also suffered damage, totaling approximately $16,000. Shipping and wharves at the latter and in Sydney experienced significant impacts, while 30 vessels ran aground at the Dartmouth harbor. Abnormally high tides flooded the basements of oceanfront homes in Halifax. Three people drowned near Devils Island while attempting to set fishing nets. The New York Herald reported that damage throughout Atlantic Canada may have reached $200,000.

=== Other storms ===
Chenoweth proposed eight other storms not currently listed in HURDAT. The first such system was detected over the central Atlantic well east of Bermuda on August 16. Moving northwestward as a tropical storm, the cyclone was last noted three days later. Chenoweth's second unofficial system formed over the eastern Atlantic near the Cabo Verde islands on August 24. Gradual intensification occurred, with the system becoming a Category 1 hurricane as it trekked northwestward. After curving northeastward on August 30, the storm began weakening and dissipated on September 1 southwest of the Azores. Another unofficial cyclone formed over the south-central Atlantic by August 30. The cyclone remained a tropical storm for several days as it initially moved west-northwestward, northwestward by September 3, and then northward on September 6. After turning northeastward on September 7, the storm strengthened into a hurricane by the next day. The system weakened to a tropical storm on September 10 and dissipated southeast of Newfoundland. Another tropical depression developed over the south-central Atlantic on September 5. This cyclone strengthened into a tropical storm on the following day as it headed northwestward and then into a hurricane on September 11 while moving northward. The hurricane then turned northeastward that day and transitioned into an extratropical cyclone on September 14 about halfway between Newfoundland and Ireland.

The fifth new system proposed by Chenoweth formed over the Gulf of Honduras on September 16. Moving very slowly westward, the cyclone made landfall in British Honduras (present-day Belize) early on September 18 as a tropical storm and soon dissipated. On September 23, the next proposed cyclone developed as a tropical depression well east of the Lesser Antilles. Reaching hurricane status by September 25, the system nearly struck Barbuda on the following day. The cyclone also passed close to Bermuda on September 30 while moving northeastward. After passing the island, the storm began to weaken and dissipated on October 1. Chenoweth proposed that a tropical storm existed over the southwestern Caribbean by October 2. Heading generally west-northwestward, the system made landfall in Nicaragua near Tasbapauni on October 4 and dissipated early the next day. The eighth and final storm proposed by Chenoweth formed over the eastern Caribbean on October 15. After crossing Puerto Rico as a tropical storm on the following day, the cyclone entered the Atlantic and strengthened into a hurricane on October 18. The system curved northeastward on October 19 and began losing tropical characteristics, becoming extratropical on the next day about halfway between Bermuda and Sable Island.

== Seasonal effects ==
This is a table of all of the known storms that formed in the 1871 Atlantic hurricane season. It includes their known duration (within the basin), areas affected, damages, and death totals. Deaths in parentheses are additional and indirect (an example of an indirect death would be a traffic accident), but were still related to that storm. Damage and deaths include totals while the storm was extratropical, a wave, or a low, and all of the damage figures are in 1871 USD.

Saffir–Simpson scale
TD	TS	C1	C2	C3	C4	C5

Storm Name	Dates active	Storm category at peak intensity	1-min winds mph (km/h)	Pressure hPa	Areas affected	Damage	Deaths
One	June 1 – 5	Tropical Storm	60 (95)	999	Gulf Coast of the United States (Texas)	Unknown	4
Two	June 8 – 10	Tropical Storm	60 (95)	Unknown	Gulf Coast of the United States (Texas)	Unknown	1
Three	August 14 – 23	Category 3 Hurricane	115 (185)	952	The Bahamas, Southeastern United States (Florida)	Unknown	1
Four	August 17 – 30	Category 3 Hurricane	115 (185)	962	Lesser Antilles (several landfalls), The Bahamas, Southeastern United States (Florida)	Unknown	≥27
Five	August 30 – September 5	Category 2 Hurricane	105 (165)	Unknown	Nova Scotia	Unknown	Unknown
Six	September 5 – 8	Category 1 Hurricane	80 (130)	982	Florida, Georgia	Unknown	Unknown
Seven	September 30 – October 7	Category 1 Hurricane	80 (130)	Unknown	Gulf Coast of the United States (Florida), Southeastern United States	>$5,000	>2
Eight	October 10 – 13	Category 1 Hurricane	80 (130)	Unknown	Atlantic Canada (Nova Scotia)	>$16,000	Unknown
8 tropical cyclones	June 1 – October 13		115 (185)	952		>$21,000	≥35

== See also ==
- Atlantic hurricane
- Atlantic hurricane reanalysis project
- Tropical cyclone observation
