= List of forts in Florida =

There are several historical forts in the U.S. state of Florida. De Quesada states that there have been more than 300 "camps, batteries, forts and redoubts" in Florida, since European settlement began. More than 80 "blockhouses, forts, camps and stockades" were used at one time or another in Florida, during the Seminole Wars. Most forts were constructed from earth or wood, or both; some incorporate brick or stone. Many were intended to be used for only a short period, and most have effectively disappeared. In some cases, a series of forts with different names were built on or close to the same place.

== List of forts ==
- Battery San Antonio, Pensacola
- Camp Daniels
- Camp Darley - Second Seminole War fortification.
- Camp Munroe - Second Seminole War fortification. p. 170.
- Camp Dunlawton - Second Seminole War fortification - site of the Battle of Dunlawton.
- Camp Scott, Everglades
- Cantonment Clinch, Pensacola
- Castillo de San Marcos (also Fort Marion and Fort St. Mark, now a U.S. National Monument)
- Fort Alabama see Fort Foster
- Fort Ann
- Fort Annuttgeliea
- Fort Arbuckle, Frostproof, Polk County
- Fort Armstrong, near Bushnell. On December 28, 1835, 180 Seminoles ambushed Major Francis L. Dade and his two U.S. Army companies of 110 soldier, resulting in the Dade battle. All but three of Dade's men were killed. The massacre began the Second Seminole War. A regiment of Tennessee militiamen led by Major Robert Armstrong, built Fort Armstrong at the site of Dade's Massacre. From Fort Armstrong, Brigadier General Keith Call led an attack on the Seminoles living in the Wahoo Swamp a few days after the fort's construction ended.
- Fort Barnwell - Second Seminole War fort - was also known as Fort Columbia.
- Fort Barker
- Fort Barrancas (also Fort San Carlos de Barrancas)
- Fort Basinger - Second and Third Seminole War Fort.
- Fort Birch - Second Seminole War Fort.
- Fort Blount
- Fort Braden
- Fort Brooke - Second Seminole War Fort.
- Fort Brooks - Second Seminole War Fort.
- Fort Butler
- Fort Caben - Second Seminole War Fort.
- Fort Call - Second Seminole War Fort.
- Fort Caroline
- Fort Carroll
- Fort Casey
- Fort Center
- Fort Chokonikla (also Fort Chokkonickla and Fort Chokhonikla, now part of Paynes Creek Historic State Park)
- Fort Christian - Second Seminole War Fort. p. 190.
- Fort Christmas – one in a series of four small, short lived forts built along the St. Johns River during the Seminole Wars. These forts were used to garrison troops and protect supplies during War.
- Fort Clarke, in present-day Gainesville, Second Seminole War
- Fort Clinch
- Fort Coombs
- Fort Cooper
- Fort Crèvecoeur (French), First Spanish Period
- Fort Cross, on Cape Sable, Third Seminole War
- Fort Cummings - Second Seminole War Fort.
- Fort Dade (Withlacoochee River), Second Seminole War
- Fort Dade (Egmont Key), Spanish–American War
- Fort Dallas, Miami - Second Seminole War fort.
- Fort De Soto
- Fort Defiance, Second Seminole War
- Fort Denaud - Second Seminole War fort.
- Fort Diego
- Fort Denaud, LaBelle
- Fort Doane
- Fort Drane - Second Seminole War fort.
- Fort Drum
- Fort Dulaney - Second Seminole War fort.
- Fort Duncan McRee (also Addison Blockhouse) - Second Seminole War Fort.
- Fort Fanning - Second Seminole War Fort. Also known as Fort Mellon.
- Fort Florida - Second Seminole War Fort.
- Fort Foster - Established during the Second Seminole War as Fort Alabama by Colonel William Lindsay in present-day Hillsborough County, Florida. Fort Alabama was destroyed and a new fort, Fort Foster, was built to replace it and named for Lieutenant Colonel William S. Foster. Fort Foster State Historic Site is a reproduction of the fort and is a part of the Hillsborough River State Park.
- Fort Foster, Collier County - not to be confused with Fort Foster in Hillsborough County.
- Fort Floyd - Second Seminole War Fort.
- Fort Fraser
- Fort Fulton - Second Seminole War Fort.
- Fort Gadsden
- Fort Gardiner - Second Seminole War Fort.
- Fort Gatlin
- Fort George
- Fort Green
- Fort Hanson - Second Seminole War Fort - (located eighteen miles southwest of St. Augustine).
- Fort Harlee
- Fort Harrell
- Fort Hartsuff
- Fort Harvie
- Fort Heilman - Second Seminole War Fort.
- Fort Homer W. Hesterly
- Fort Hooker
- Fort Houston, in Tallahassee, Civil War
- Fort Jackson - Second Seminole War Fort.
- Fort Jefferson
- Fort Jupiter - Second Seminole War Fort. pp. 190, 193.
- Fort Keais
- Fort Keats - Second Seminole War Fort.
- Fort King - Second Seminole War Fort.
- Fort Kingsbury - Second Seminole War Fort.
- Fort Kissimmee
- Fort Lane – one in a series of four small, short lived forts built along the St. Johns River during the Seminole Wars. These forts were used to garrison troops and protect supplies during War.
- Fort Lauderdale - Second Seminole War Fort.
- Fort Lloyd
- Fort Lonesome
- Fort Macomb - Second Seminole War Fort.
- Fort Maitland
- Fort Mason
- Fort Matanzas
- Fort McCoy (formerly Fort MacKay)
- Fort McNeil, north bank of Taylor Creek, Orange County
- Fort McRee
- Fort Meade
- Fort Mellon – one in a series of four small, short lived forts built along the St. Johns River during the Seminole Wars. These forts were used to garrison troops and protect supplies during War.
- Fort Micanopy, Second Seminole War
- Fort Mitchell
- Fort Mose
- Fort Myakka
- Fort Myers
- Fort New Smyrna - Second Seminole War Fort.
- Fort Ogden
- Fort Peyton - Second Seminole War Fort - (originally called Fort Moultrie which was located 6 miles west of St. Augustine).
- Fort Pickens
- Fort Picolata
- Fort Pierce - Second Seminole War Fort.
- Fort Poinsett, on Cape Sable, Second Seminole War.
- Fort Preston - Second Seminole War Fort.
- Fort Reid
- Fort Russell, on Key Biscayne, Second Seminole War
- Fort St. Andrews
- Fort St. Francis de Pupa
- Fort San Carlos, Fernandina Beach, Second Spanish rule
- Fort San Lucia
- Fort San Luis de Apalachee
- Fort San Marcos de Apalache (also Fort St. Marks)
- Fort San Nicholas
- Fort Scott
- Fort Shackleford
- Fort Shannon - Second Seminole War fortification.
- Fort Simmons
- Fort Simon Drum
- Fort Stansbury
- Fort Starke
- Fort Sullivan
- Fort Tarver - Second Seminole War fortified plantation

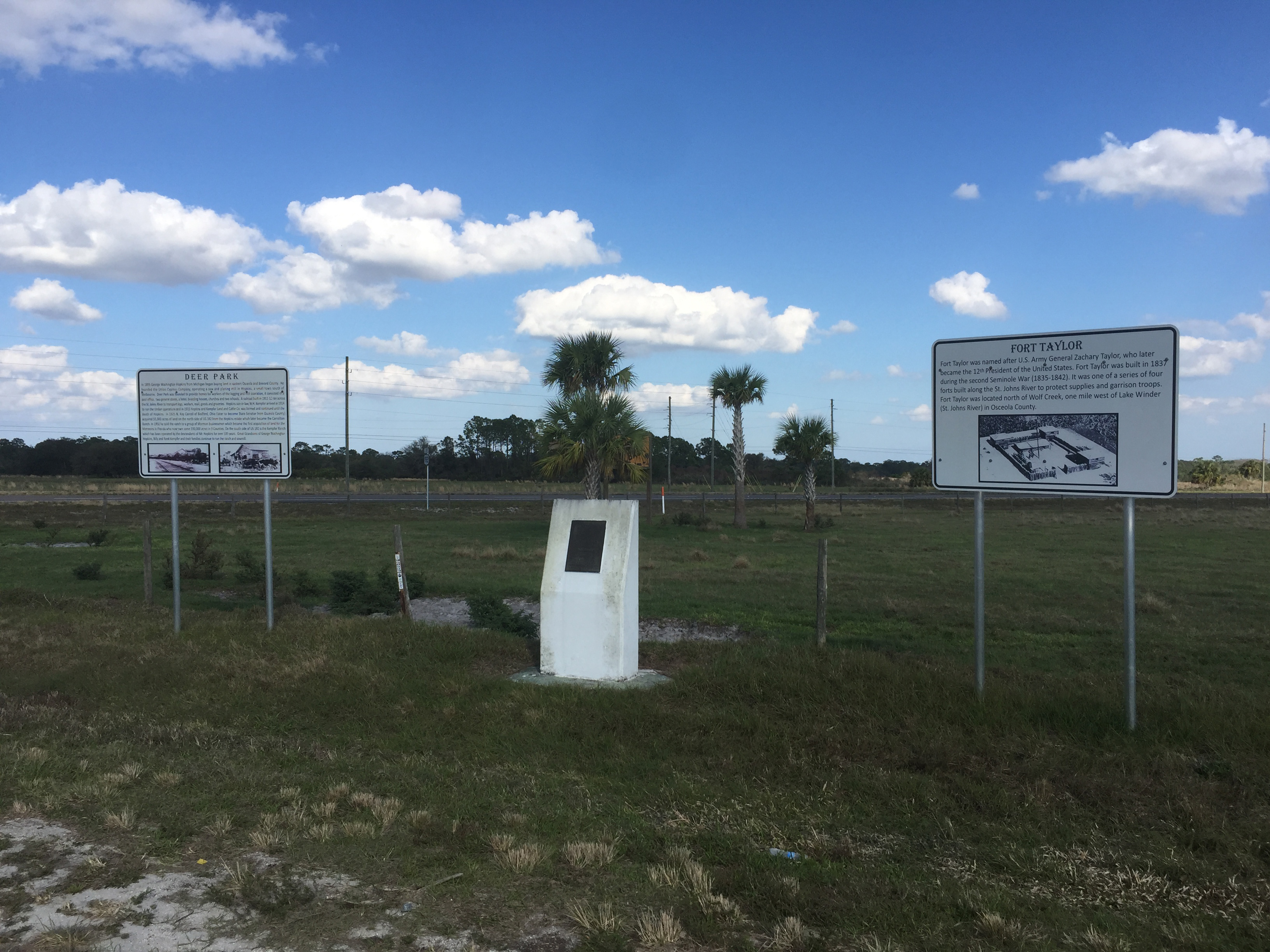
Fort Taylor in Deer Park

- Fort Taylor – one in a series of four small, short lived forts built along the St. Johns River during the Seminole Wars. These forts were used to garrison troops and protect supplies during War. This should not be confused with Fort Zachary Taylor (see below), built in Key West, Florida, approximately 280 miles to the Southwest of this Fort Taylor's location. The future President was a Colonel during the Second Seminole War and served in the Florida campaigns at the same time this Fort Taylor was in active operation.
- Fort T.B. Adams
- Fort Thompson
- Fort Tonyn
- Fort Vinton
- Fort Volusia - Second Seminole War Fort.
- Fort Wacahoota - Second Seminole War Fort.
- Fort Walker (also Fort Hogtown), in present-day Gainesville, Second Seminole War
- Fort Walton
- Fort Ward
- Fort Weadman
- Fort White - Second Seminole War Fort.
- Fort William
- Fort Zachary Taylor (also Fort Taylor) – Fort Zachary Taylor should not be confused with the original Florida "Fort Taylor" – entry above, which was built during the Second Seminole War as one of a string of four small, short-lived Forts along the Saint John's River, approximately 280 miles to the Northeast of Key West, Florida. During the Second Seminole War (1835 – 1842) future President Zachary Taylor – for whom this Key West, Florida fort was named – was a Colonel in the US Army, leading troops in the field.
- Mala Compra Fortress also known as the Post at Mala Compra - Second Seminole War fortification.
- Martello towers, Key West, Florida
  - Fort East Martello
  - West Martello Tower
- Post at Orange Grove Plantation - Second Seminole War fortress.
- Negro Fort
- Presidio Santa Maria de Galve, Pensacola
- St. Joseph's Fortress also known as Camp Brisbane - Second Seminole War fortification.
- Yellow Bluff Fort

== See also ==
- List of forts in the United States
- Florida Seminole Wars Heritage Trail.
