= Fort Greene (disambiguation) =

Fort Greene is a neighborhood in Brooklyn, New York.

Fort Greene may also refer to:

- Fort Greene Park, Brooklyn, NY
- Fort Greene Historic District, Brooklyn, NY
- Fort Greene (Newport, Rhode Island), a War of 1812 fort
- Fort Greene (Narragansett, Rhode Island), WW2 coast defense fort, current Army Reserve center
- Success Academy Fort Greene, part of Success Academy Charter Schools

== See also ==
- Fort Green, a fort in Florida
- Fort Greene Ville, formerly a fort in Ohio and now a renamed city
