= Fort Sullivan =

Fort Sullivan may refer to:

== United States ==
Florida

- Fort Sullivan (see List of forts in Florida)

Maine

- Fort Sullivan (Maine), near Eastport
- Fort Sullivan (1775-1866), in Kittery, Maine opposite Portsmouth, New Hampshire, now Portsmouth Naval Prison

Pennsylvania

- Fort Sullivan from the Sullivan Expedition of the Revolutionary War, near Athens

South Carolina

- Fort Sullivan (South Carolina) (see Fort Moultrie), on Sullivan's Island
