= St. Joseph, Florida (disambiguation) =

St. Joseph, Florida was a boomtown that was briefly the largest community in the Florida Territory.

St. Joseph, Florida may also refer to:

- Port St. Joe, Florida, the county seat of Gulf County
- St. Joseph, Pasco County, Florida, an unincorporated community
- St. Joseph's Colony, an attempt to establish a German Roman Catholic community in Lake Monroe, Florida

== See also ==
- St. Joseph's Plantation (Flagler County, Florida)
