= Fort Kissimmee Cemetery =

Cemetery in Florida

Coordinates: 27°35′31″N 81°09′24″W

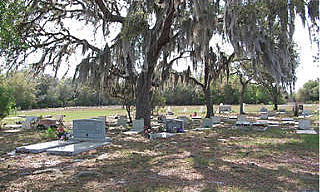
- Fort Kissimmee Cemetery
- Interactive map of Fort Kissimmee Cemetery

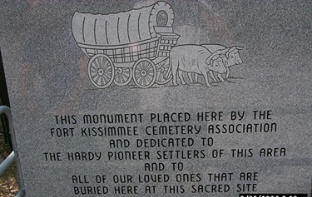
Fort Kissimmee Cemetery Monument

Fort Kissimmee Cemetery is one of the oldest Florida Heartland pioneer cemeteries located on private property, within the eastern boundary of the Avon Park Bombing Range in Highlands County, Florida along the Kissimmee River. The cemetery is approximately 20 miles (32 km) east of Avon Park, Florida.

The cemetery was started by a community of cattle farmers located along the Kissimmee River near the old Fort Kissimmee site used during the Seminole Indian Wars. Kissimmee River is an Indian name meaning "long water", given to the river by the Creek Indians. Once the Indians were driven further south, the Florida Heartland area was then opened up to pioneer settlers. Getting to Heartland was not easy during the mid-19th century since there were not many well-traveled roads except for military roads connecting the different forts. Much of the supplies were brought to these settlers by steamboats and used to haul out their produce.

== History ==
Florida became a state in 1845 and cattle farmers began migrating to Florida from Georgia and South Carolina to the Manatee Florida area including the Kissimmee River Valley. By 1855 cattle had become a number one industry in Florida. These areas were some of the better conditions for grazing cattle in Florida. The Kissimmee River Valley was nothing like Texas with wide open ranges but was rugged sandy and swampy terrain mixed with prairies, piney woods, marshes, sloughs, scrub oaks and palmetto patches along with large live oak hammocks.

After the third Seminole Indian War, the community along the Kissimmee River was attractive to cattle ranchers and laborers because of the vast prairie land to raise cattle. The living conditions in the Kissimmee Valley was primitive and required someone with grit and a hard work ethic to overcome the harsh conditions. As the community grew, they began to build a church and a school at Fort Kissimmee. A tragedy happened in the community, around 1890, while building the school house near the current location of the cemetery. Two men named John Sheffield and a man with the last name Shaw got into a violent argument in which both went for their shotguns and shot each other. John's two small boys, John Lewis and Tom Sheffield, stood and watched as they fired their guns at the same time. Both families used lumber from the old school house to build the two men coffins and buried them near the site of the school house. This was the beginning of the Fort Kissimmee Cemetery.

Just before World War II began in 1942, the settlers were paid a settlement to move from the Kissimmee River Valley area by the US government before turning the cattle grazing land into a bombing range for the United States Air Force. Many of the settles moved to other areas south of the bombing range along the Kissimmee River valley area such as Fort Basinger and Okeechobee or Lorida areas. Over the next several years the cemetery deteriorated because the pioneer families had limited access to maintain the cemetery since the USAF controlled the land surrounding the cemetery. The families from the Fort Kissimmee area assumed that the government would preserve the cemetery. It was later discovered the USAF was planning on leveling the Fort Kissimmee area and moving the buried remains to the desired location at the request of the family. This did not set well with the families and they contacted every public, government and Air Force official with no success to save the cemetery. It was a Louis Alsmeyer from Sebring, Florida who was good friends with several of the family members that made contact with the Adjutant General in Atlanta and other Air Force authorities. He was able to convince them to allow the cemetery to remain, place a fence and to allow family members to visit the graves once a year. The original wrought iron fencing around the cemetery still exists today.

It was several years later during the 1950s when a few pioneer descendants returned to the area to find much of the cemetery had overgrown with trees and grass. This same group began having regular meetings to raise funds and make plans to clean up the cemetery. This was the beginning of forming the Fort Kissimmee Cemetery Association. Some 20 plus years later, the cemetery association made contact with the USAF inquiring how to secure some of the land surrounding the cemetery. The cemetery association was later successful in getting the United States government to deed approximately 4.25 acres (17,200 m^{2}) to the non-profit Fort Kissimmee Cemetery Association, Inc. The land stretches from the back side of the cemetery to the river.

Today the private cemetery is maintained by many of the pioneer's descendants involved through the Fort Kissimmee Association. The association meets every Memorial Day weekend to camp, clean the cemetery, and conduct their annual members meeting. On the Sunday of Memorial weekend, many family members and old timers come to enjoy a big Bar-B-Que consisting of wild hog, homegrown beef and swamp cabbage. These are some of the same foods their ancestors lived on when Fort Kissimmee was a thriving community.

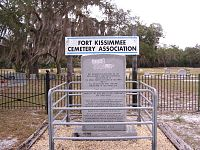
Fort Kissimmee Cemetery Association
