= Cantonment Clinch =

Coordinates: 30.41465°N 87.26198°W

Cantonment Clinch was an Army fort in Pensacola, Florida built about 1822 (originally called Camp Hope and Camp Brady) and active through the early 1830s. It was established during the First Seminole Wars to house United States troops during a yellow fever epidemic in Pensacola and at Fort Barrancas.

== History ==
In 1822, the Fourth Infantry Regiment of the U.S. Army, which had been stationed at positions since December 31, 1821, underwent changes due to a yellow fever outbreak in Pensacola. Company I was moved to Dauphin Island, Alabama. The remaining companies relocated to two camps west of Pensacola on Bayou Chico, called Camps Hope and Brady. Here, they constructed Cantonment Clinch in honor of their respected Colonel. This facility was built using logs for nine companies as per the 1821 military regulations, with each company constructing their own log housing. The troops were responsible for the entire construction, including flooring and roofing, with minimal reliance on nails and utilizing wooden pegs and clay for durability. The cantonment, which was whitewashed, provided comfortable quarters that were used for several years without further relocations until at least December 31, 1822.

The camp also served to facilitate the relocation of Creek and Seminole tribes to central Florida and to preempt any Spanish or English military action in the area. Reflective of the expedient fortification practices of the era, it was one of many forts built in mid-19th century Florida, with varying degrees of permanence and purpose, catering to the immediate defense needs of the coastal region. Cantonment Clinch, serving its intended short-term role, was ultimately disbanded as part of this broader pattern of transient military installations.

Officers took United States Army troops to this location to flee an outbreak of yellow fever at other forts and in Pensacola city; they built this cantonment at the head of Bayou Chico circa 1822. The Cantonment lay three miles west of Pensacola. It was then a small town of 181 households, with about one-third the population of mixed race, reflecting its Creek, European and African residents, and their descendants of unions. In 1823, the military renamed this Camp Galvez Spring, and later that year as Cantonment Clinch, after a beloved colonel of their regiment.

The cantonment was built to include ten log barracks and ten quarters for officers, arrayed around a large parade ground. The Post Surgeon began recording weather observations in 1822, summarized in the Army Meteorological Register.

The US Army likely drew from these forces in local wars against the Pensacola and Creek tribes, as well as early Seminole Wars. The Seminole relocated to central Florida. The US military also used their troops to construct roads to other military facilities in west Florida and adjacent portions of Alabama.

The post closed circa 1830; the troops were evacuated to Baton Rouge, Louisiana.
