= Fort Shannon =

- Fort Palatka (unofficial local name)
- Fort Shannon was located along the banks of the St. Johns River in Palatka in present-day Putnam County, Florida. in United States
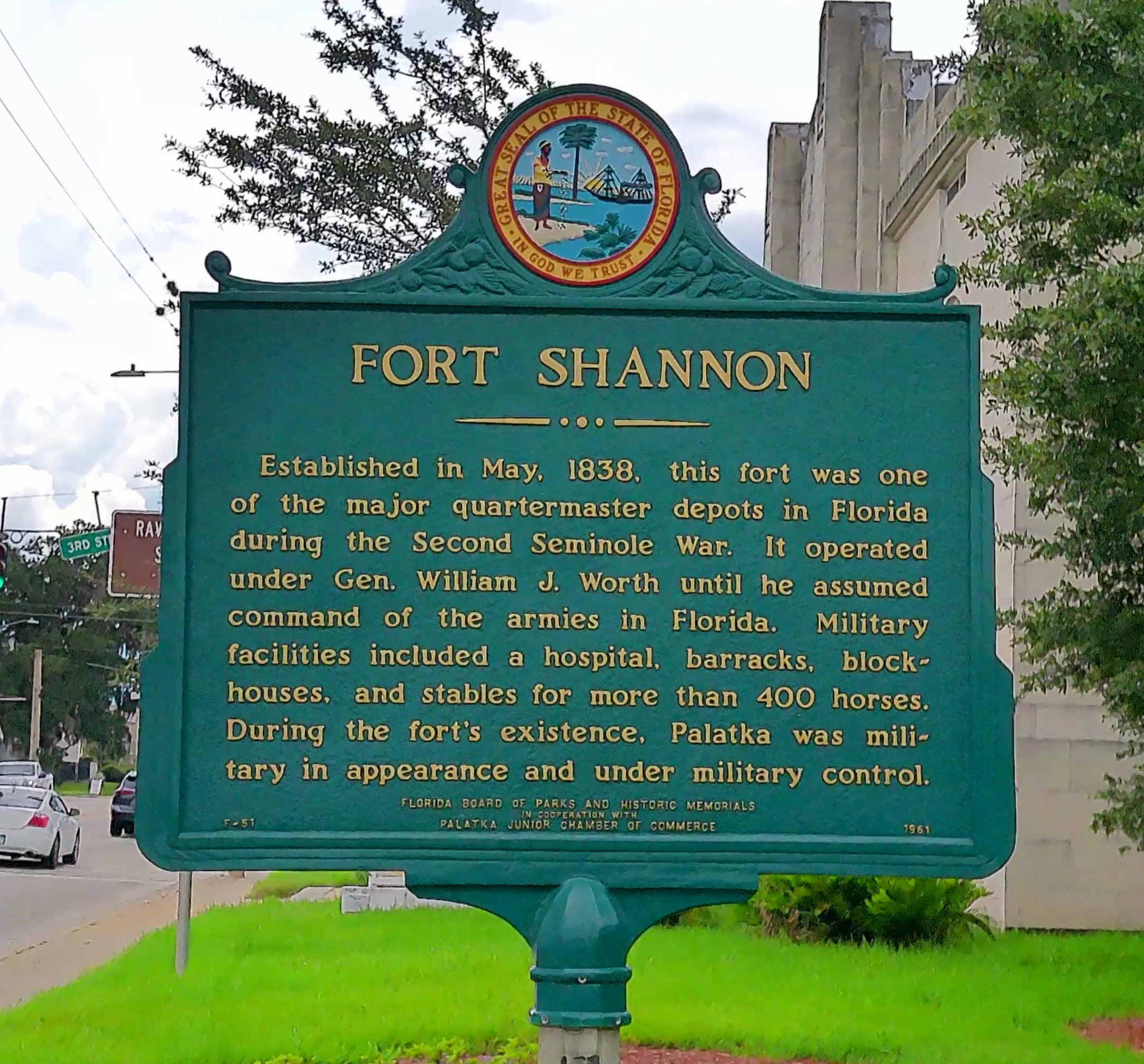
- Fort Shannon - Second Seminole War Fort - Historical Sign.

Site information
- Condition: Completely destroyed except for the Officer’s Quarters building.

Location
- Location of Fort Shannon Fort Shannon (the United States)
- Coordinates: 29°38′52″N 81°39′5″W

Site history
- Built: 1838
- Built by: United States Army
- In use: 1838-1843 - Second Seminole War. (Abandoned in the 1880s.)
- Materials: Pine logs (stockade and blockhouses), and wood framed buildings.
- Fate: Abandoned in the 1880s.
- Events: Fort Shannon was built in 1838 as a main supply depot for the U.S. Army. It also served as headquarters for the St. Johns district during the Second Seminole War.

Garrison information
- Past commanders: Colonel William J. Worth
- Garrison: Regular army troops and militiamen.

The Indian Removal Act provoked many Seminole Indians and their allies to revolt against being forcibly relocated from their lands and homes in the Florida Territory to Indian Territory west of the Mississippi River. After the Dade Massacre on 28 December 1835, the Second Seminole War was escalated with armed skirmishes and guerilla warfare. Early in the Second Seminole War, the strategically located town of Palatka, Florida Territory was attacked and burned by a group of Seminole Indians and their allies. Most surviving white settlers and black slaves fled to St. Augustine for safety, and the area was mostly abandoned except for free roaming groups of Seminole Indians and their allies. Realizing the importance of a militarily protected and efficient supply line along the St. Johns River General Walker Keith Armistead ordered the main depot moved from Garey's Ferry on Black Creek to Palatka where the U.S. Army built Fort Shannon.

== History ==
Fort Shannon was established in May 1838 under the command of General William J. Worth. General Worth remained in command of Fort Shannon until 1842 when he was promoted and assumed command of all the armies of Florida. This fortification was part of a network of forts that protected the strategically important transportation routes along the St. Johns River. Fort Shannon grew in size to include eight blockhouses, a hospital, several large wood-framed buildings, officer's barracks and a stables large enough to accommodate 400 horses.

General Walker Keith Armistead divided his command into three districts: the St. Johns – headquartered at Fort Shannon in Palatka; the Atlantic – headquartered at Fort Marion in St. Augustine; and the Oklawaha – headquartered at Fort King. Fort Shannon remained an important supply depot and headquarters where large numbers of troops could be housed, trained and deployed during the Second Seminole War. It was abandoned by the U.S. Army on 24 August 1843, after the Second Seminole War was over.

Fort Shannon was briefly utilized during the American Civil War by Union troops as they occupied Palatka and patrolled the St. Johns River with gunboats. The building materials of Fort Shannon were pilferaged and eroded away in the 1880s, except for its Officer's Quarters building.

Pictures of the only building left from Fort Shannon can be found below.

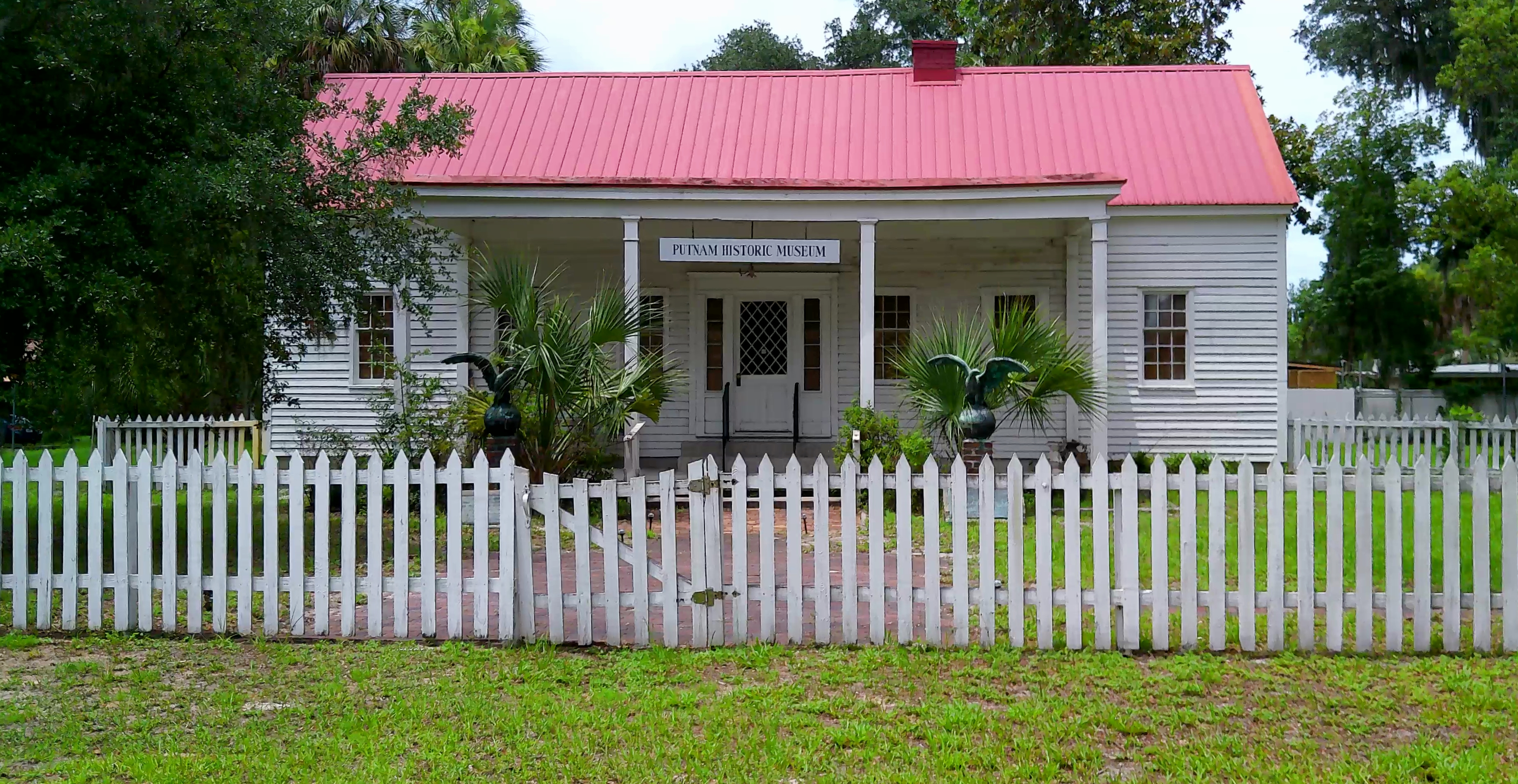
Putnam Historic Museum (Fort Shannon - Officer's Quarters - front view).

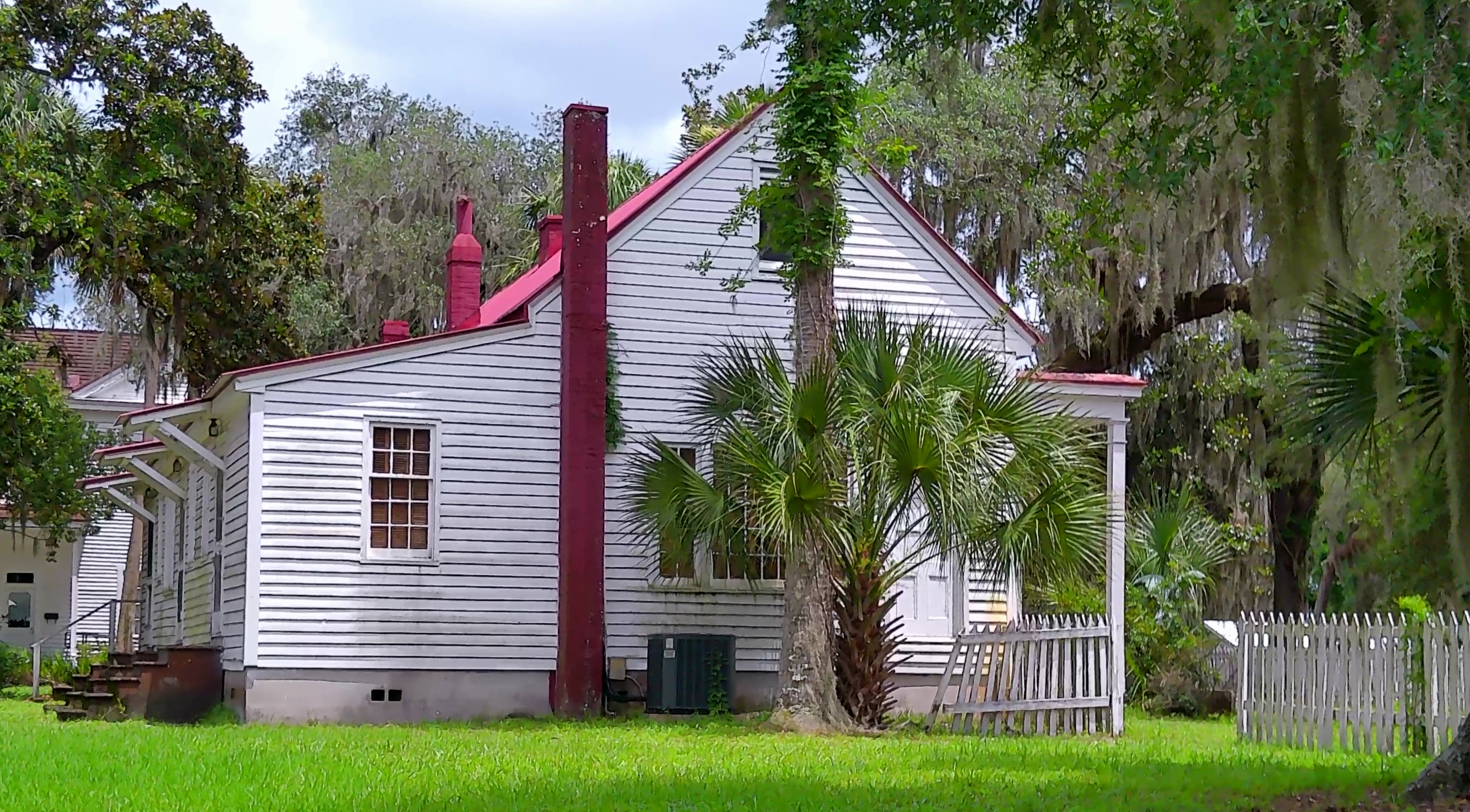
Putnam Historic Museum (Fort Shannon - Officer's Quarters - side view).

== Namesake ==
The Army and Navy Chronicle, Volume III, From 1 July – 31 December 1836, announced the death of Captain Samuel Shannon. The death notice reads:

At Tallahassee, Florida, on the 7th ultimo, Captain Samuel Shannon, of the 1st infantry, assistant quartermaster of the U.S. Army. In the death of this valuable officer, the country has sustained no ordinary loss. Ever prompt to obey the summons of his country, Capt. Shannon although laboring under severe bodily infirmities repaired to Tallahassee to take charge of the quartermaster’s department, preparatory to the anticipated campaign against the Seminole Indians. Whilst in the active performance of its duties, he was attacked by the prevailing fever, and sunk under its influence.

As an efficient officer, there were none superior, but few equal. Energetic, prompt, and undeviating in principle, he was a peculiar favorite of the department he represented. The unlimited confidence reposed in him by the head of it, attests the value and high regard entertained for his services, by not ordering, but soliciting him to perform the arduous duties of quartermaster in that sickly clime.

In private life, or whenever relaxation from duty permitted him to mingle with his friends, the feelings of his warm and generous heart shone conspicuous. His effable demeanor and friendly attentions endeared him to all who knew him, and long will his memory be cherished with feelings of the fondest recollection, by the friends who knew him well. –Pensacola Gazette.

The official death date for Captain Samuel Shannon is 4 September 1836. He is buried in the St. Augustine National Cemetery, in the Benea, Pyramids plot, in St. Augustine, Florida.

== Site ==
Today, the only thing that remains of Fort Shannon is its Officer's Quarters building, which now serves as the Putnam Historic Museum and home of the Putnam County Historical Society. This building is the only known surviving military structure built by U.S. Army troops or militiamen during the Second Seminole War. This building was moved to its current site and was renovated into the Putnam Historic Museum. An historical sign placed by the Florida Board of Parks and Historic Memorials in cooperation with the Palatka Junior Chamber of Commerce stands is Palatka, Florida near the original site of Fort Shannon which reads:

"Established in May, 1838, this fort was one of the major quartermaster depots in Florida during the Second Seminole War. It operated under Gen. William J. Worth until he assumed command of the armies of Florida. Military facilities included a hospital, barracks, blockhouses and stables for more than 400 horses. During the forts existence, Palatka was military in appearance and under military control."

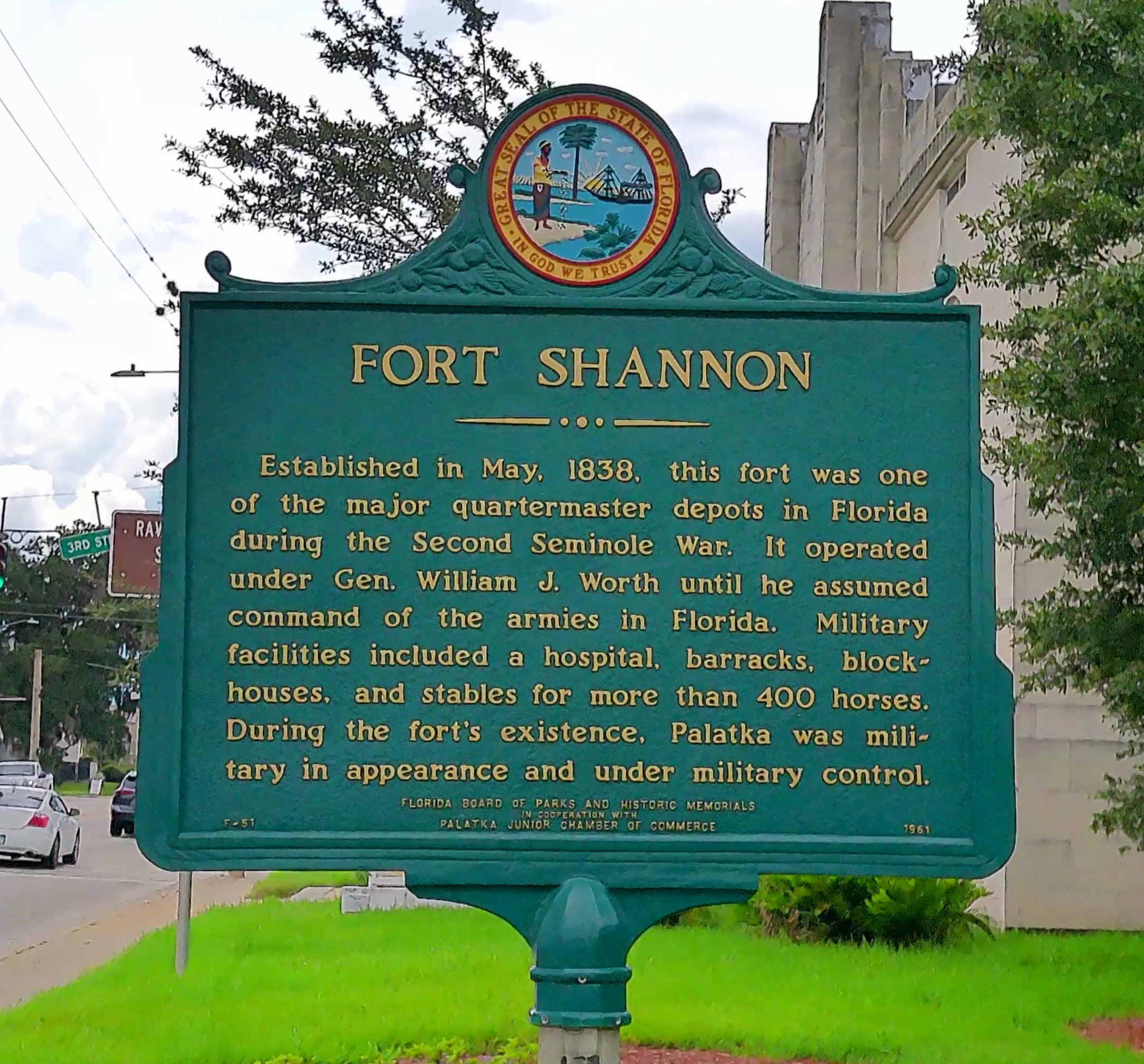
Fort Shannon - Historical Marker - east side.

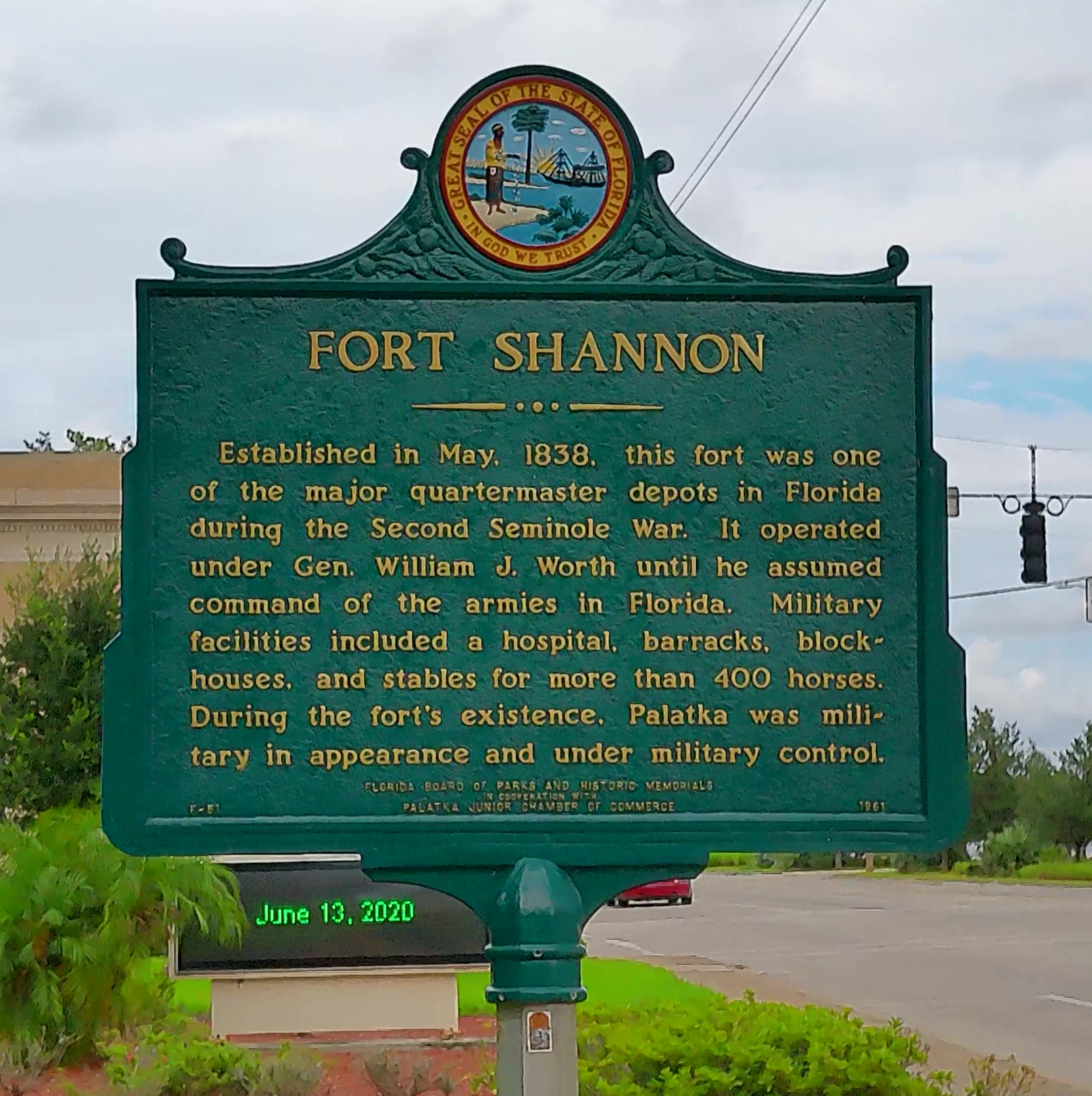
Fort Shannon - Historical Marker - west side.
