= Pleasant Point, Nova Scotia =

Coordinates: 44°42′9.4″N 63°4′9.1″W

Pleasant Point in Nova Scotia

Pleasant Point is a community of the Halifax Regional Municipality in the Canadian province of Nova Scotia.

Located about 45 minutes from the city of Dartmouth, the community offers picturesque vistas of ocean and forests. Jutting out into the Atlantic, at the end of a deep fiord with numerous drumlins created by the last Ice Age, Pleasant Point lies on Kent Island. The local weather is moderated by the ocean, with it being generally milder in winter and cooler in the summer than most inland areas. Many forms of wildlife inhabit the area with pheasants, foxes, coyotes and bald eagles being very common. The French Point Lighthouse is one of the two Musquodoboit Harbour Range Lights found at Pleasant Point. This old lighthouse stands at the end of the Kent Road. The lighthouse, though not in use, is one of three lighthouses that remain standing on the entire Eastern shore, the only one in Halifax Regional Municipality accessible by land. No public access to the lighthouse is permitted. The lighthouse was used for years for navigational purposes to ensure the safety of fishermen and other vessels entering Musquodoboit Harbour. It is on private land - Kent Island, although the actual "footprint" where the lighthouse stands is owned by the Federal Government. Only a handful of residences can be found in Pleasant Point and the population is less than 100 people. Notorious Canadian art thief John Tillmann was a year-round resident of Pleasant Point.

The memoirs of Robert Kent of Kent's Island (now Pleasant Point) Halifax County, Nova Scotia was published in 1954 by the Nova Scotia Historical Society. It describes his life as a pioneer in the area from 1813 to 1840 and was narrated to his daughter-in-law, Mrs. Joseph Kent prior to his death in 1892.
