= St. Joseph's Plantation (Flagler County, Florida) =

Early 19th century plantation in Florida, US

St. Joseph’s Plantation (Flagler County, FL)
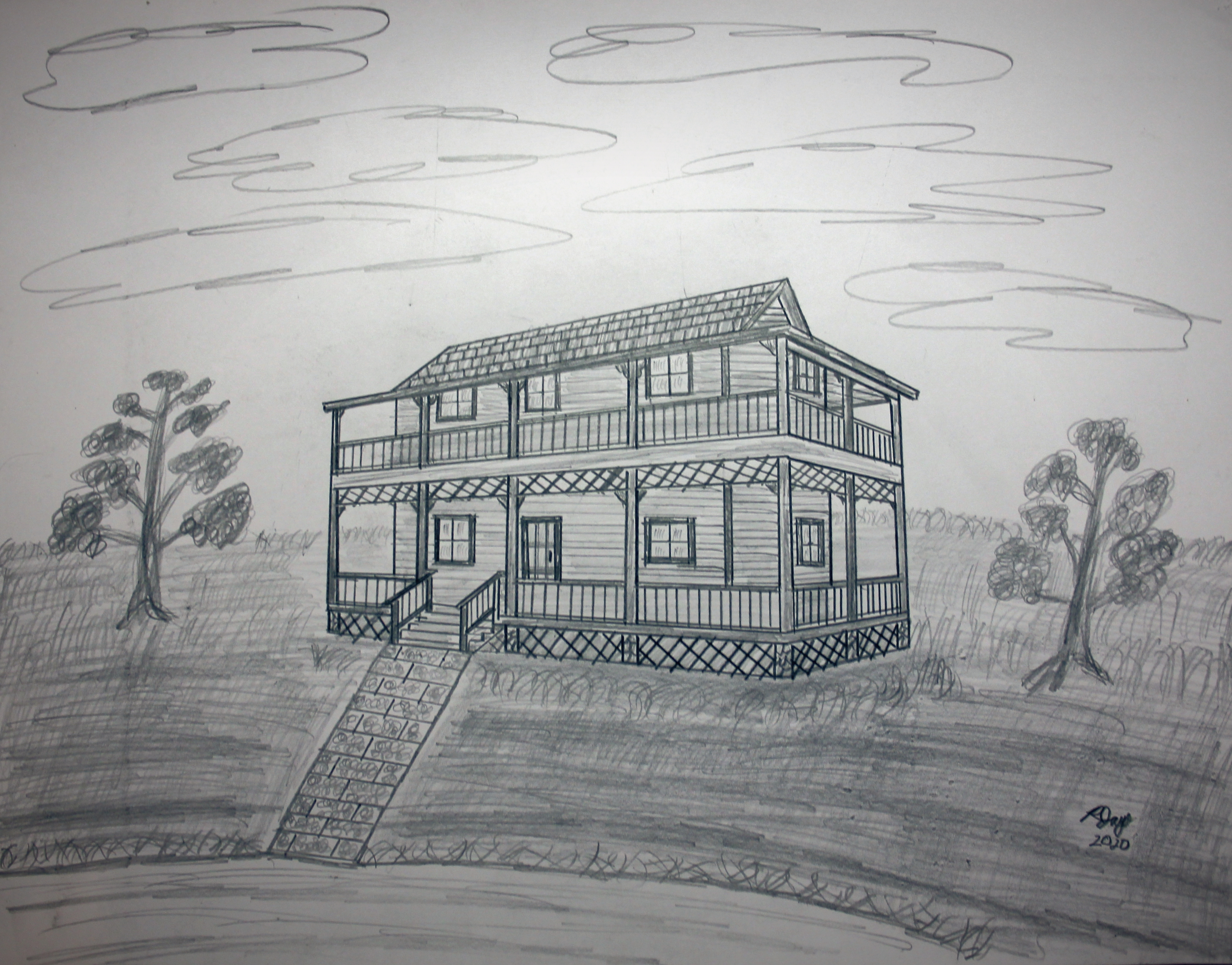
- Artist’s depiction of the main house of St. Joseph's Plantation – ca. 1835.

- Location within Florida Location within the United States

General information
- Location: Palm Coast, Florida
- Coordinates: 29°32′17″N 81°13′24″W
- Completed: 1816

The St. Joseph's Plantation was established in 1816 during the Second Spanish Rule (1783–1821) of Florida after Joseph Marion Hernandez purchased an 807.5-acre Spanish land grant. The forced-labor farm was located near the present-day intersection of Palm Coast Parkway and Old Kings Road in Palm Coast, Flagler County, Florida.

Until the early 1970s, ruins of some of the foundations of buildings, roads and canals of this once sprawling and thriving plantation complex were visible above ground. The ruins were bulldozed and covered over to construct new homes, roads, and commercial buildings in Palm Coast, Florida.

== Historical descriptions ==
In 1835, a visiting planter from the West Indies described the St. Joseph's Plantation in an article published in the Farmers’ Register titled, ‘On the Soils and Agricultural Advantages of Florida’ as: "...the most valuable plantation soil wise, in Florida...Hernandez had with great perseverance and success overcome the laborious difficulties of clearing and draining new land, and has under culture upwards of 200 acres of these swamp lands. The judgment of this observer was that the swamp-lands of East Florida and especially those lying on the branches of the Matanzas and Halifax Rivers are superior in strength and character for the production of sugar to the most valued lands of the West India Islands."

The House Report 58, 28th Congress, 1st Session, January 19, 1844, described the St. Joseph's Plantation as being located next to the Graham Swamp at the head of the Matanzas River. The historical descriptions of the St. Joseph's Plantation describes it as a large and sophisticated operation that was worked and maintained by at least 80 enslaved people. The plantation grew and harvested many crops that included 200 acres of ratoon and planted cane, 200 acres of corn intermixed with cane, 80 acres of hammock land, 80 acres of peas and 20 acres of potatoes.

The St. Joseph's Plantation included extensive causeways, roads and bridges. In addition, there were several large canals that were four, five and seven feet wide and seven feet deep that ran from a half to one and a half miles in length. About two million cubic feet of cross-ditching that spanned over 200 acres were two feet wide and two feet deep, and spaced 35 feet from each other, were used for drainage.

In addition to the main house, there were many outbuildings that included a large well-finished stone boiling house that was connected with a curing house that measured 67 feet long by 31 feet wide with division walls for molasses cisterns. Several buildings supported sugar production and included a mill house, a large frame building with a steam engine with iron rollers (used to grind sugar cane), a large two-story wood-framed corn house and a wood-framed pumpkin house. Other building that supported the operation of the plantation included two large cattle sheds, a large fodder house, a blacksmith shop, kitchen and various houses for enslaved workers. There were also several oxen, horses, cattle, hand carts, a variety of trade tools and miscellaneous plantation-related machinery.

== Military occupation ==
During the Second Seminole War, the Florida Militia commandeered the St. Joseph's plantation and renamed it Camp Brisbane. Troops converted the large two-story main house into a storehouse on its first floor and a hospital on its second floor. The troops also fortified the large two-story main house's perimeter with logs from the plantation's blacksmith shop and two of its log slave houses. St. Joseph's Plantation/Camp Brisbane became the Florida Militia's (second brigade of the second regiment) main supply depot for its operations south of St. Augustine. U.S. Army and militia troops abused the plantation during their occupation by halting all of its operations and pilfering and destroying much of its resources and property.

After the Florida Militia was defeated by the Seminoles and their allies at the Battle of Dunlawton on January 18, 1836, Brigadier General Hernandez ordered the battered and wounded troops, led by Major Benjamin Putnam, to retreat to Bulowville and wait for additional orders and troop reinforcements. On January 23, 1836, Hernandez was notified that reinforcements were not coming so he ordered Major Putnam to abandon Bulowville and move his troops to St. Joseph's/Camp Brisbane. The hospital at St. Joseph's Plantation/Camp Brisbane was not equipped or staffed to accommodate all the wounded troops. As a result, Major Putnam abandoned St. Joseph's Plantation/Camp Brisbane on January 28, 1836, and move all of his troops and people enslaved at the farm to St. Augustine. That left the St. Joseph's Plantation/Camp Brisbane abandoned and unguarded. Soon afterwards, in 1836, the Seminole Indians and their allies looted the remaining property and burnt most of the remaining buildings to the ground.

== Rebuilding attempts ==
Joseph Marion Hernandez filed a claim against the United States government for about $100,000 for damages sustained on the St. Joseph's Plantation and other properties during the Second Seminole War. In March 1839, a partial payment of monetary awards for his war claims were approved by the United States Congress. Hernandez received additional payments between 1839 and 1842 that totaled $39,521. In 1844, Hernandez asked Congress to pay the balance of $64,494 (~$2.12 million in 2024) but his request was declined. Even though Hernandez recovered some of his wartime losses from the U.S. government, it was not enough to completely rebuild the St. Joseph's Plantation and his other decimated properties. Hernandez managed to yield a considerable crop of sugar and syrup from the St. Joseph's Plantation, but it was not enough income to maintain the plantation.

== Fate ==
In 1850, Hernandez moved to Cuba and the parts of what remained of the St. Joseph's Plantation were abandoned and eventually eroded away and were pilfered over the following decades.

Today, nothing remains above ground of the St. Joseph's Plantation, whose site has been completely redeveloped with modern structures and roadways.
