= Fort Green =

Historic fort in Fort Green, Florida, United States

Coordinates: 27.6256°N 81.9397°W

Fort Green is located in northwestern portion of present-day Hardee County, Florida. Twenty families forted-up there for protection during the Third Seminole War. In 1856, was the home site of James Dopson Green, and subsequently named after him.
